= Glossina fuscipes =

Scientific classification
- Kingdom: Animalia
- Phylum: Arthropoda
- Clade: Pancrustacea
- Class: Insecta
- Order: Diptera
- Family: Glossinidae
- Genus: Glossina
- Species: G. fuscipes

Binomial name
- Glossina fuscipes Newstead, 1910

Subspecies
- G. f. fuscipes; G. f. martinii; G. f. quanzensis
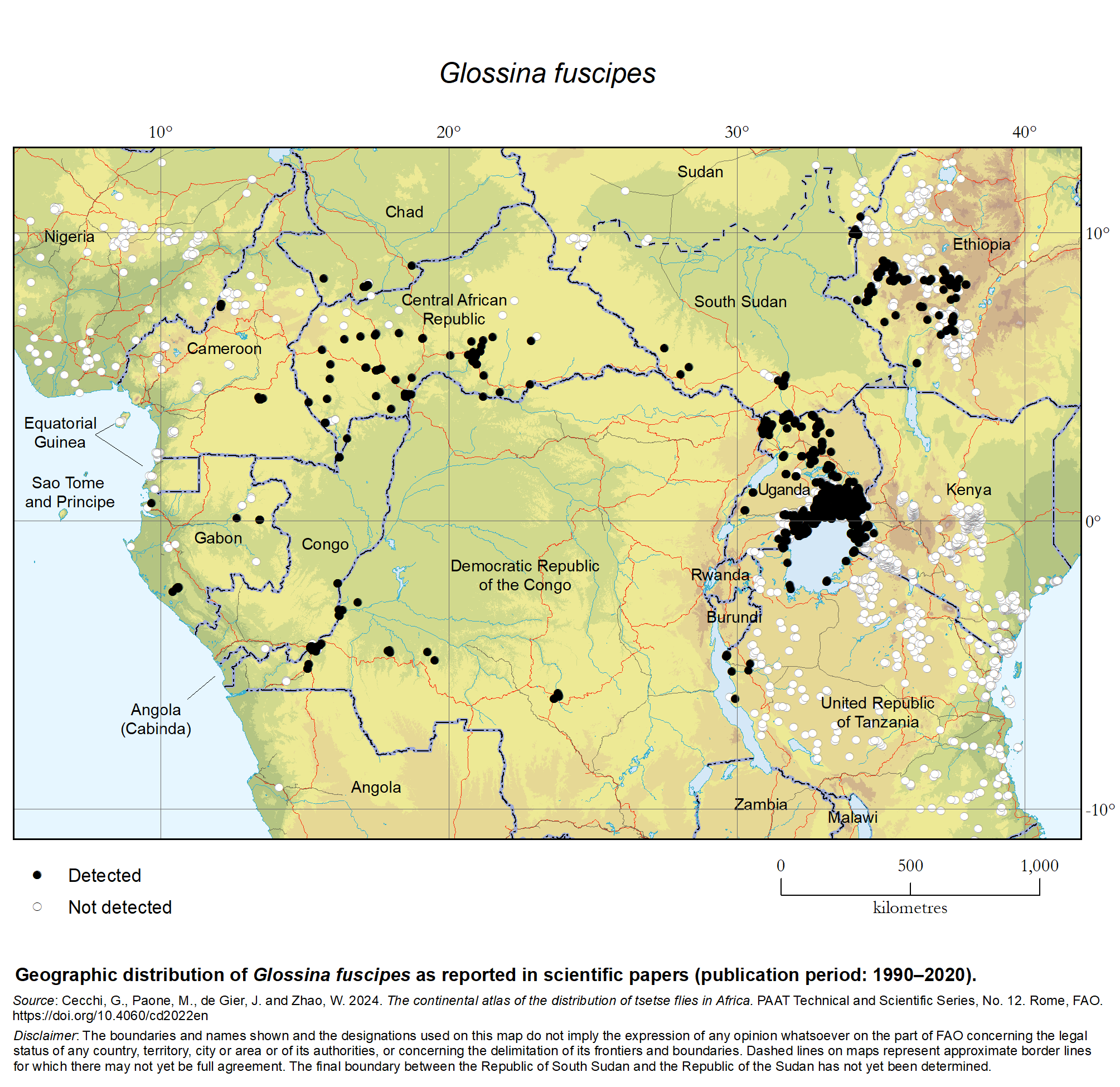
- Geographic distribution of Glossina fuscipes as reported in scientific papers – Publication period 1990–2020

Synonyms
- Glossina angolensis Vanderplank, 1948; Glossina angolensis Vanderplank, 1949; Glossina martinii Zumpt, 1935; Glossina quanzensis Pires, 1948; Glossina ziemanni Grunberg, 1912

Species of tsetse fly

Glossina fuscipes is a riverine fly species in the genus Glossina, which are commonly known as tsetse flies. Typically found in sub-Saharan Africa but with a small Arabian range, G. fuscipes is a regional vector of African trypanosomiasis, commonly known as sleeping sickness, that causes significant rates of morbidity and mortality among humans and livestock. Consequently, the species is among several being targeted by researchers and veterinary and public health authorities for population control as a method for controlling the disease.

== Physical description ==
G. fuscipes are often brown or grey-brown in color. Their bodies tend to have varied dark and light patches, effectively camouflaging them on surfaces such as bark, rock, or soil. At rest, G. fuscipes appear slim as they fold their wings on their backs so that one lies on top of the other. This is in contrast to houseflies and blowflies whose wings project outward at an angle while resting on their backs. Following a blood meal, the insect's abdomen will appear large, rounded and red.

=== Males ===
When the male G. fuscipes is examined from the ventral side, a rounded structure named the hypopygium can be seen at the posterior end of the abdomen. Immediately in front of the hypopygium is a plate bearing dark hairs called hectors. Both the hypopygium and the hectors help distinguish male from females and serve to grasp onto the end of the female abdomen during mating. As copulation commences, the hypopygium unfolds to uncover superior and inferior claspers as well as the aedeagus.

=== Females ===
The end of the female abdomen lacks any significant structures that would be the counterpart of the male hypopygium and hectors; however, females display a vulva, which can exhibit several small plates that aid in species identification.

== Life cycle ==
=== Egg stage ===
In a few hours, the sperm move from the spermatophore into the spermatheca, where they remain active for the remainder of the female's life. Eggs are fertilized immediately as they enter the uterus by sperm from the spermatheca that come into contact and penetrate the anterior portion of the egg. The fertilized egg remains in the uterus for about four days as the instar larva begins to develop.

Once she has mated, a female can produce larvae for the remainder of her life. At about 25 °C, a female fly will produce mature larva every 9–10 days with the exception of the first, which may take up to 18–20 days. Lower temperatures result in a lower rate of breeding whereas higher temperatures increase the rate of breeding. Temperatures either too high or too low may cease breeding altogether.

=== Larva ===
The G. fuscipes larva in passes through three instars as it grows up to when the fully grown larva is dropped by a female fly. The larva has a mouth at the anterior end and two spiracles at the posterior end. Rather unusually, the larva spends most of its time and does all its feeding within the mother's body.

Apart from food stored in the egg, the food supply for the three larval instar stages comes from the mother's milk gland. The milky secretions of this gland are expelled out of the gland duct at the head end of the larva. The larva sucks up the milky secretion and passes it directly to the midgut where it is slowly digested and assimilated.

For air supply, the larva depends on air entering the vulva of the female. The air must pass into the female's posterior spiracles or polypneustic lobes to reach the larva.

==== Abortion ====
If a larva fails to reach its full size, it will be prematurely expelled from the uterus. The aborted larva dies. Abortions could be due to the mother fly not obtaining enough food or also when carelessly handled or exposed to insecticide. Eggs are subjected to abortion for the same reasons.

=== Pupa ===
The pupa is a dark brown, shorter than the larva that produced it, and rounded with polypneustic lobes at the posterior end. The lobes are distinctively shaped and can help to distinguish the G. fuscipes pupa from that of other flies. The pupa also has a hard case on its outside called the puparium.

The pupal stage lasts about four to five weeks according to temperature. Higher temperatures shorten the pupal period. In contrast, lower temperatures lengthen the pupal period to more than 50 days in certain climates. However, temperature extremes will cause death.

=== Adult ===
When ready to emerge, the young adult fly expands its ptilinum to burst open puparium's end. Out of the fresh hole and surrounding soil, the adult emerges by using the ptilinum, struggling to the top of the soil and into open air. At this stage, the adult's body is very soft while its wings are small and crumpled. After a few urinations, the wings will expand towards their proper size. From the time between the emergence of the fly and its first meal, the adult is called a teneral fly. After the first blood meal has been taken, the fly is then termed a non-teneral fly.

== Reproduction ==
=== Mating ===
During mating, males settle on the back of the female. Claspers at the posterior end of the male abdomen unfold in order to grip the end of the female abdomen. This mating position may be maintained for an hour or two before the duo parts.

Females typically mate a young age, either before or around the same time of their first blood meals. Females usually mate only once in their lives though it is possible mate more than once, whereas males tend to mate several times. Older males are more likely to mate successfully than very young males.

During mating, the aedeagus is inserted into the vulva and reaches into the uterus as far as the spermatheca exit. A sizable ball of sperm is deposited there in the form of a spermatophore. At the conclusion of mating, the male releases his grip on the female before flying away.

== Distribution and habitat ==
G. fuscipes ranges across a vast region in Central and Eastern Africa, spanning from Cameroon and Gabon in the west to Kenya and Ethiopia in the east, and from Chad and Sudan in the north to Angola, the Democratic Republic of the Congo and Zambia in the south. A subpopulation of G. f. fuscipes exists in the very southern part of the Arabian Peninsula. G. f. f. and G. m. submorsitans are the only subspecies of Glossina which survive outside Africa, including in southwestern Saudi Arabia. They prefer high-humidity areas, namely biomes such as mangrove swamps, rain forests, lake shores, and gallery forests along rivers.

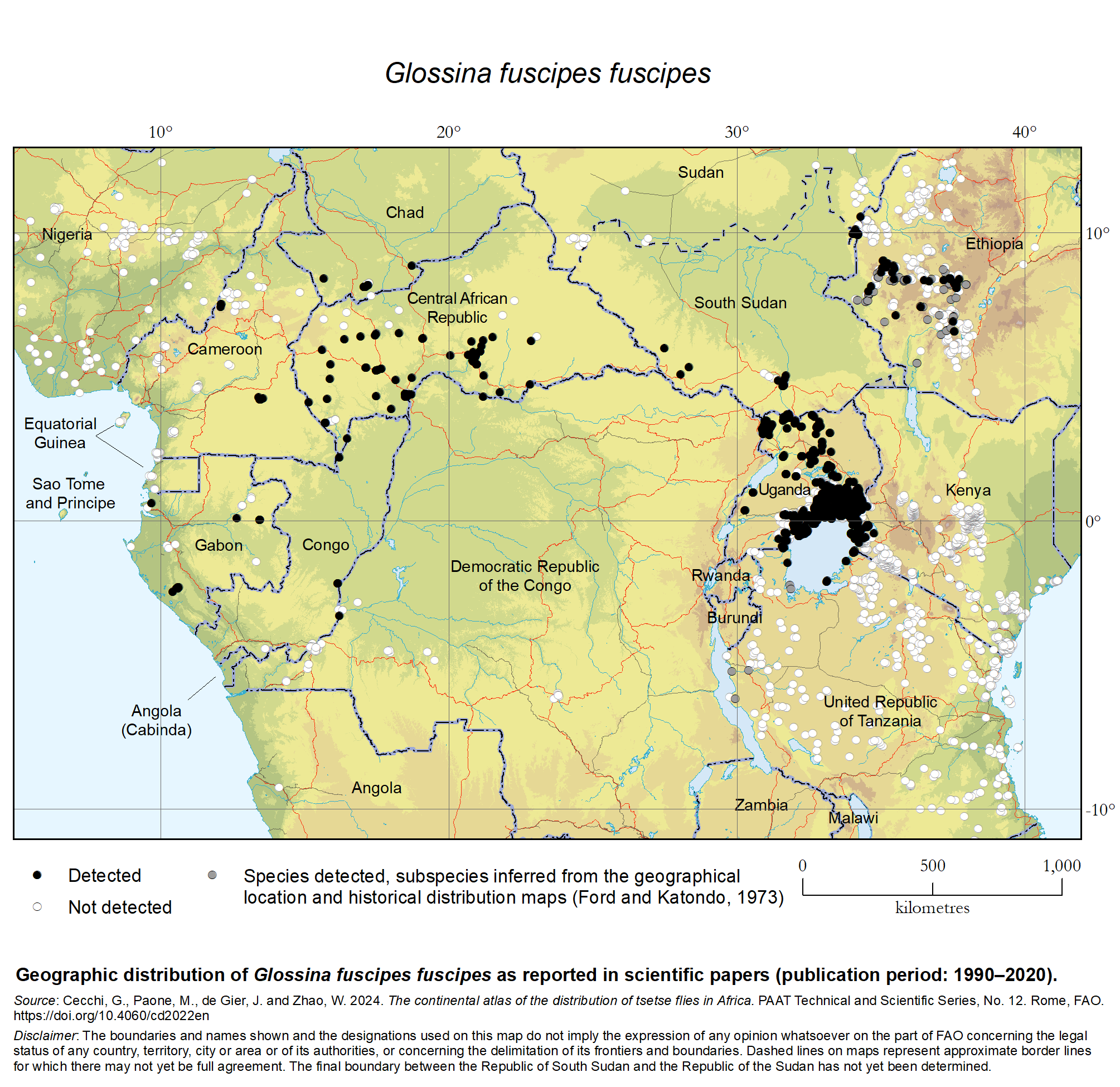
Geographic distribution of Glossina fuscipes fuscipes

=== Glossina fuscipes fuscipes ===
Glossina fuscipes fuscipes occupies the largest, northern part of the distribution of Glossina fuscipes, including 13 countries in central Africa and eastern Africa (i.e. Cameroon, the Central African Republic, Chad, Congo, the Democratic Republic of the Congo, Ethiopia, Gabon, Kenya, South Sudan, Sudan, Uganda, the United Republic of Tanzania and Zambia). In the peer-reviewed scientific literature for the period 1990–2020, Glossina fuscipes fuscipes was reported from 11 of these countries, and namely from Cameroon, the Central African Republic, Chad, Congo, Ethiopia, Gabon, Kenya, South Sudan, Sudan, Uganda, and the United Republic of Tanzania. The gap in the Democratic Republic of the Congo and Zambia in the period 1990–2020 is due to the lack of published surveys in the historically infested areas.

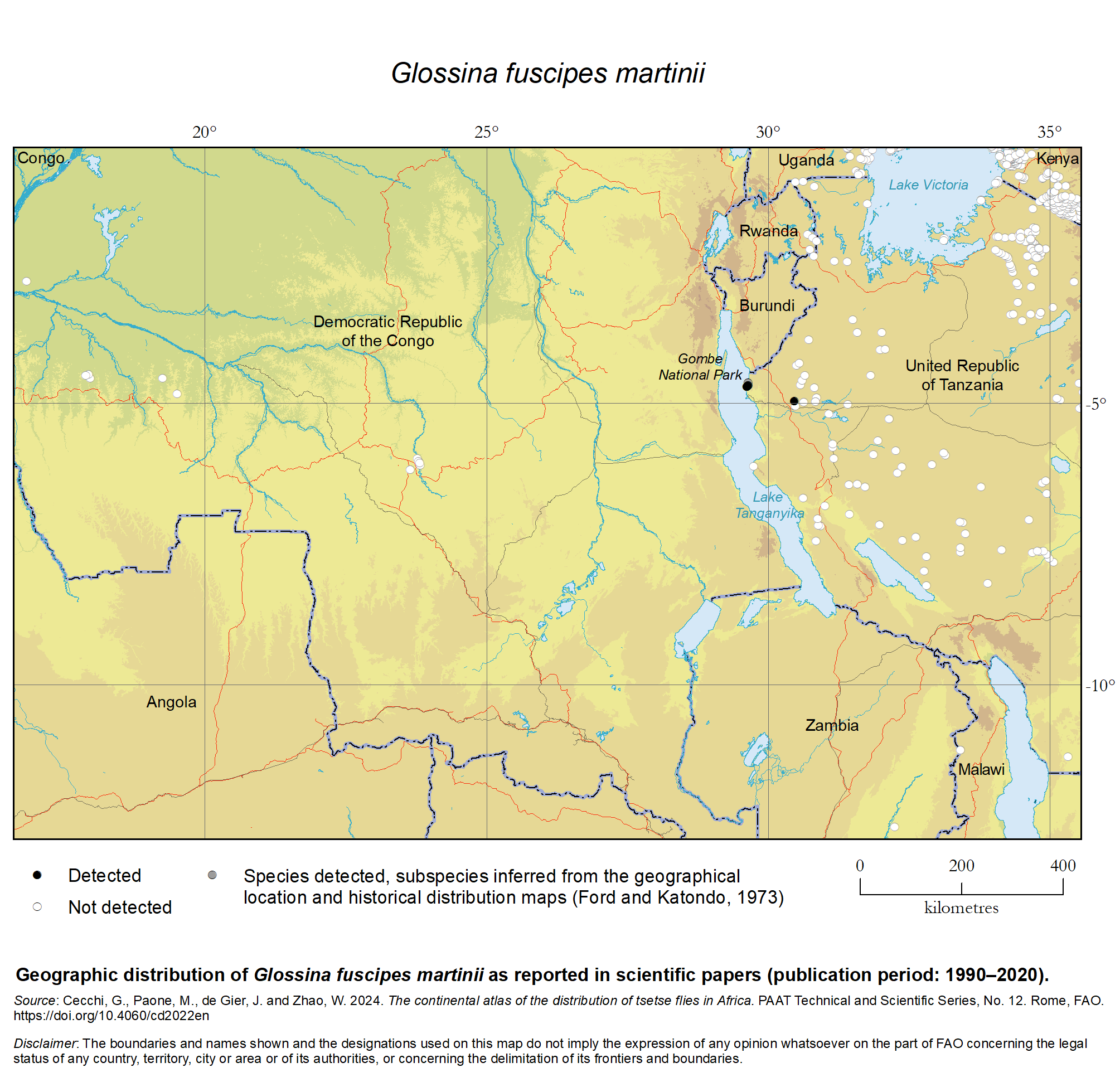
Geographic distribution of Glossina fuscipes martinii

=== Glossina fuscipes martinii ===
Glossina fuscipes martinii occupies the relatively small, southeastern part of the distribution of Glossina fuscipes, historically including 5 countries in central Africa and eastern Africa (i.e. Burundi, the Democratic Republic of the Congo, Rwanda, the United Republic of Tanzania and Zambia). Although the main area of occurrence of Glossina fuscipes martinii is known to be the southeastern part of the Democratic Republic of the Congo, in the peer-reviewed scientific literature for the period 1990–2020 the subspecies was only reported from the United Republic of Tanzania. The gap in the Democratic Republic of the Congo is due to the lack of published surveys in the historically infested areas in the period 1990–2020; and the same reason could also explain the smaller gaps in the neighbouring areas of Burundi and Rwanda, while a recent study reported the subspecies in Zambia.

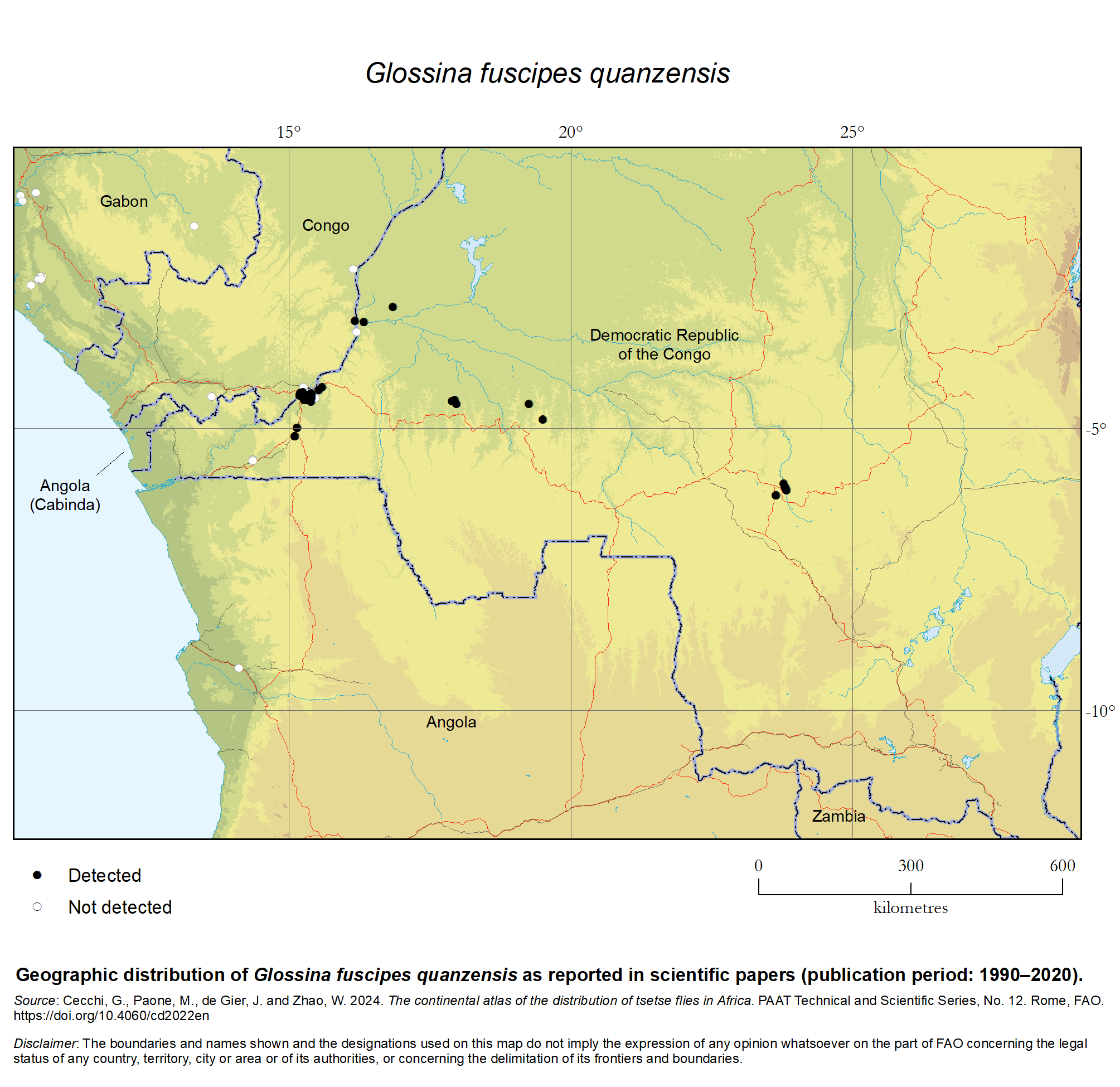
Geographic distribution of Glossina fuscipes quanzensis

=== Glossina fuscipes quanzensis ===
Glossina fuscipes quanzensis occupies the southwestern part of the distribution of Glossina fuscipes, including 3 countries in central Africa (i.e. Angola, the Democratic Republic of the Congo, and the Congo). In the peer-reviewed scientific literature for the period 1990–2020 all but one of the published reports of Glossina fuscipes quanzensis were from the Democratic Republic of the Congo, with one from the Congo. The gap in Angola is due to the lack of published surveys in the historically infested areas in the period 1990–2020.

== Evolution and taxonomy ==
The genus Glossina is regarded as an isolated genus and it is usually classified into its own family Glossinidae. The genus is further divided into three subgenera, morsitans, fusca, and palpalis, the latter of which being the subgenus to which G. fuscipes belongs. The species is further broken down into subspecies;

- Glossina fuscipes martinii.
- Glossina fuscipes fuscipes.
- Glossina fuscipes quanzensis.

== Food Resources ==
G. fuscipes feed on vertebrate blood and have been traditionally described as strictly hematophagous. Glucose sugars are not a metabolic requirement for this species because it uses a proline-alanine shuttle system for the distribution of energy. Instead, triglycerides are used for storage in fly body fat and milk secretions. However, researchers have conducted laboratory experiments and a field study that show G. fuscipes are able to feed on sugar water in the lab and wild flies contain sugar residues. Although continuous feeding with high sugar concentrations appeared to be toxic, sugar given either occasionally or at low concentrations did not affect mortality and fecundity.

== Predators ==
G. fuscipes adults and pupae are a food source for a variety of predators including vertebrates and arthropods. However, no insectivorous species is known to solely feed on G. fuscipes or tsetse flies in general. Thus, a reduction in insectivorous birds during general tsetse fly control campaigns could be attributed to the simultaneous insecticide-related removal of other insect species than decreases in tsetse flies themselves.

== Trypanosomiasis ==
Some trypanosome species, transmitted by G. fuscipes and other tsetse fly species, cause the infectious disease trypanosomiasis. In humans, G. fuscipes trypanosomiasis is also known as sleeping sickness. In animals, the disease may be known as nagana or surra according to the animal species infected as well as the trypanosome species involved. Nagana typically refers to the disease specifically in cattle and horses; however, it is commonly used to describe any type of animal trypanosomiasis.

=== Disease vectors and hosts ===
G. fuscipes, alongside other tsetse flies, are prominent biological vectors of protozoan parasites belonging to the genus Trypanosoma known to cause the namesake diseases in various vertebrate species including humans, antelopes, bovine cattle, camels, horses, sheep, goats, and pigs. The parasites are transmitted to humans via bites from G. fuscipes, which have acquired their infection from other human beings or animals harboring human-pathogenic parasites.

The table below summarizes this information for the G. fuscipes species; however, the diseases listed below may be transferred by other tsetse fly species in addition to G. fuscipes.

Disease	Species affected	Trypanosoma agents	Distribution
Sleeping sickness — acute form	humans	T. brucei rhodesiense	Eastern Africa
Nagana — acute form	antelope cattle camels horses	T. brucei brucei	Africa
Nagana — acute form	domestic pigs cattle camels horses	T. simiae	Africa
Surra — chronic form	domestic pigs warthog —(Phacochoerus aethiopicus) forest hogs —(Hylochoerus spp.)	T. suis	Africa

=== Population control ===
The containment of sleeping sickness and nagana would be of great benefit to rural communities in sub-Saharan Africa, alleviating poverty and improving food security, thus efforts are undertaken in rein in local populations of G. fuscipes via methods such as pesticide campaigns and trapping.

== Mutualism ==
=== Microbiome ===
G. fuscipes flies rely on the obligate symbiont bacterial genus Wigglesworthia to supplement their diets with nutrients essential for fecundity. The adult immune system relies similarly on Wigglesworthia for activation and development. A secondary, facultative symbiont is the genus Sodalis, which is present in tsetse populations considered to play a role in the ability to transmit trypanosomes. Finally, the third symbiont is the genus Wolbachia, transovarially transmitted between generations. To enhance transmission and survival, Wolbachia has evolved mechanisms to alter host reproduction.

Using both culture-dependent and independent methods, it was shown that Kenyan populations of the subspecies G. f. fuscipes harbor diverse range of bacteria. Of the flies tested, bacteria were isolated from 72% of the sample population with 23 bacterial species identified. Of these, the Bacillota phylum constituted 16 species, seven of which belong to the genus Bacillus.

== See also ==
- List of diseases spread by invertebrates
