= Trypanosomiasis =

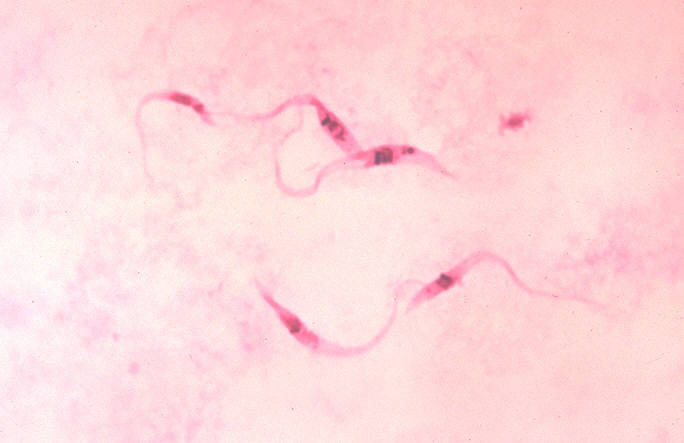
- Specialty: Infectious diseases, veterinary medicine

Trypanosomiasis or trypanosomosis is the name of several diseases in vertebrates caused by parasitic protozoan trypanosomes of the genus Trypanosoma. In humans this includes African trypanosomiasis and Chagas disease (American trypanosomiasis). A number of other diseases occur in other animals.

African trypanosomiasis in humans, which is caused by either Trypanosoma brucei gambiense or Trypanosoma brucei rhodesiense, is presently estimated to threaten over 40 million people in sub-Saharan Africa, especially in rural areas and populations affected by war or poverty. However, only 1.5 million people are estimated to live in areas at moderate or high risk, and for over 20 years the number of cases has been going down due to systematic surveillance and control efforts: in 1998 almost 40,000 cases were reported but almost 300,000 cases were suspected to have occurred; in 2009, the number dropped below 10,000; and in 2018 it dropped below 1000, and it has remained under that number ever since.

Chagas disease causes 21,000 deaths per year mainly in Latin America.

== Signs and symptoms ==
The tsetse fly bite erupts into a red chancre sore and within a few weeks, the person can experience fever, swollen lymph glands, blood in urine, aching muscles and joints, headaches and irritability. In the first phase, the patient has only intermittent bouts of fever with lymphadenopathy together with other non-specific signs and symptoms. The second stage of the disease is marked by involvement of the central nervous system with extensive neurological effects like changes in personality, alteration of the biological clock (the circadian rhythm), confusion, slurred speech, seizures and difficulty in walking and talking. These problems can develop over many years and if not treated, the person dies. It is common in Subsaharan Africa.

== Diagnosis ==
Cattle may show enlarged lymph nodes and internal organs. Haemolytic anaemia is a characteristic sign. Systemic disease and reproductive wastage are common, and cattle appear to waste away.

Horses with dourine show signs of ventral and genital edema and urticaria.

Infected dogs and cats may show severe systemic signs.

Diagnosis relies on recognition of the flagellate on a blood smear. Motile organisms may be visible in the buffy coat when a blood sample is spun down. Serological testing is also common.

One common way in which trypanosomiasis can be diagnosed in humans is through the detection of antibodies against trypanosomes made by host organisms. One commonly used antibody test which operated based on this principle is the card agglutination test, C.A.T.T. for T. gambiense. In this test, reagent is mixed with blood and shaken. Within a matter of minutes, a researcher or public health professional can determine whether someone has made these antibodies and therefore is infected with trypanosomes. Regarding the accuracy of this test, it is reported to have an 87 to 98 percent sensitivity rating.

Another way to diagnose trypanosomiasis in humans is to detect the trypanosome protozoans themselves. One way to do this would be to use lymph node aspirate. In this test, which has a sensitivity of between 40 and 80 percent, a healthcare worker will first find a cervical lymph node which is enlarged. Once the healthcare worker has punctured that lymph node, its aspirate is examined under a microscope for trypanosomes to confirm diagnosis.

== Prevention ==
The use of trypanotolerant breeds for livestock farming should be considered if the disease is widespread. Fly control is another option but is difficult to implement. The main approaches to controlling African trypanosomiasis are to reduce the reservoirs of infection and the presence of the tsetse fly. Screening of people at risk helps identify patients at an early stage. Diagnosis should be made as early as possible and before the advanced stage to avoid complicated, difficult and risky treatment procedures.

== Treatment ==
Stage I of the condition is usually treated with pentamidine or suramin through intramuscular injection or intravenous infusion if sufficient observation is possible. Stage II of the disease is typically treated with melarsoprol or eflornithine preferably introduced to the body intravenously. Both pentamidine and suramin have limited side effects. Melarsoprol is extremely effective but has many serious side effects which can cause neurological damage to a patient, however, the drug is often a patient's last hope in many late stage cases. Eflornithine is extremely expensive but has side effects that may be treated with ease. In regions of the world where the disease is common eflornithine is provided for free by the World Health Organization.

== Epidemiology ==
Trypanosomes and trypanosomiasis disease is transmitted through the tsetse fly. As many as 90 percent of sleeping sickness cases are caused by the Glossina fuscipes subspecies of the fly. The palpalis subspecies contributes the majority of the rest of the cases.

The different subspecies of the tsetse fly dominate different habitats. For instance, the Glossina morsitans subspecies inhabits savannahs while the Glossina palpalis subspecies prefers woody riverine habitats. However, all flies are susceptible to extremes in temperature (outside of the 16-40 degree Celsius range). Furthermore, trypanosomes are only able to reproduce in tsetse flies between the 25 to 30 Celsius range. These factors mean that only a minority of tsetse flies, around 20 percent, are estimated to carry trypanosomes.

These flies can also adapt to human activity, thus causing changes in disease patterns. For example, when brush is cleared for agriculture, the flies can retreat into the savannah and conversely when humans move into brush, the flies will reproduce and feed more frequently. As a result, large increases of population associated with expansion into woody habitats often coincides with trypanosomiasis epidemics.

As with other infectious diseases, climate change will have an effect on the distribution and the risk of transmission of trypanosomiasis. However, it depends on the geographical region, disease-carrying species, the exact climate change scenario, and many other factors whether there will be a decrease or increase in trypanosomiasis.

Humans, their livestock, or wild animals can all act as reservoirs of trypanosomiasis disease. However, the reservoirs used differ based on subspecies of trypanosoma protozoans and thus the variants of trypanosomiasis disease. There are two main variants of trypanosomoiasis which are in turn transmitted by different subspecies of the trypanosome protozoans. Trypanosoma brucei rhodiense tends to result in more acute forms of disease and is mainly transmitted form one human to another. Most patients with this variant of disease will die within six months of infection. Cattle can also act as a reservoir in areas where disease incidence is lower. Trypanosoma brucei gambiense is the second type of protozoan which usually results in more chronic disease patterns. Its main reservoir is the cattle populations. Although it is also fatal, death can take months or years to occur. Geographical separation of these two variants of trypanosomes occurs along the Rift Valley. Trypanosoma brucei rhodiense is usually found on the eastern side of the valley while the gambiense variant resides on the western side. The ranges of the two disease variants could overlap in Uganda, Tanzania, and Congo in the future.

Traditionally, cattle herders in East Africa were well aware of the effects of the tsetse flies and avoided these areas or set fire to the bush in order to clear the area of the flies and infected animals. The equilibrium was disturbed in the colonial era leading to multiple epidemics.

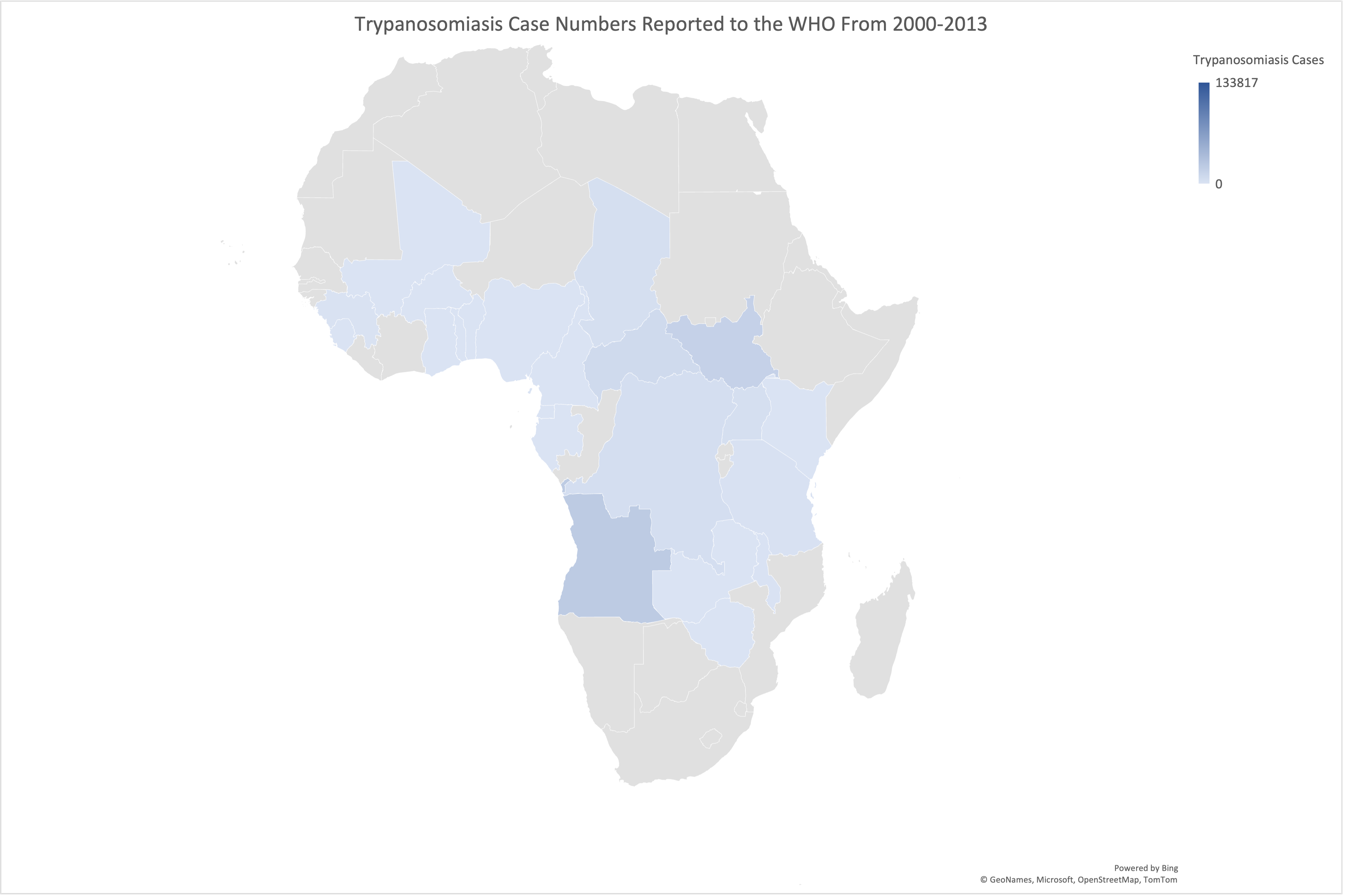
Trypanosomiasis case numbers reported to the WHO from 2000-2013. Data used came from Franco, J. R., Simarro, P. P., Diarra, A., & Jannin, J. G. (2014). Epidemiology of human African trypanosomiasis. Clinical epidemiology, 257-275.

== Research ==
Trypanosomiasis could, in future be prevented by genetically altering the tsetse fly. As the tsetse fly is the main vector of transmission, making the fly immune to the disease by altering its genome could be the main component in an effort to eradicate the disease. New technologies such as CRISPR allowing cheaper and easier genetic engineering could allow for such measures. A pilot program in Senegal, funded by the International Atomic Energy Agency, has considerably reduced the tsetse fly population by introducing male flies which have been sterilized by exposure to gamma rays. This has allowed a change of cattle breeds from lower producing trypanotolerant breeds to higher-producing foreign breeds, and was selected as one of the Best Sustainable Development Practices on Food Security by EXPO Milan 2015.

== Other animals ==
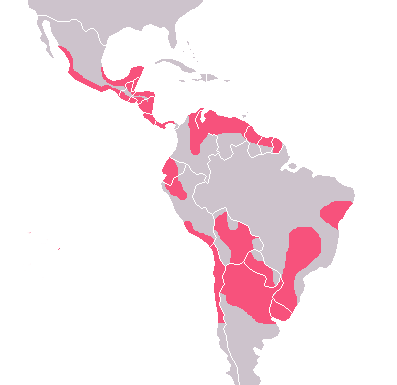
Chagas endemic zones (in red)

- Nagana, or animal African trypanosomiasis, also called 'Souma' or 'Soumaya' in Sudan.
- Surra
- Mal de cadeiras, or Quebra Bunda (of central South America, Brazil)
- Murrina de caderas (of Panama; Derrengadera de caderas)
- Dourine
- Cachexial fevers (various)
- Gambian horse sickness (of central Africa)
- Baleri (of Sudan)
- Kaodzera (Rhodesian trypanosomiasis)
- Tahaga (a disease of camels in Algeria)
- Galziekte, galzietzke (bilious fever of cattle; gall sickness of South Africa)
- Peste-boba (of Venezuela; Derrengadera)

Some species of cattle such as the African buffalo, N'dama, and Keteku appear trypanotolerant and do not develop symptoms. Calves are more resistant than adults. In Pakistan, trypanosomiasis has been reported in working donkeys in Punjab Province. Trypansoma evansi was the most prevalent species detected, ultimately affecting the donkey health and productivity {https://www.researchgate.net/profile/Anas-Qureshi/publication/324151454_Molecular_Identification_of_Trypanosomes_and_Their_Effects_on_Hematological_and_Biochemical_Parameters_in_Donkeys_in_Punjab_Pakistan/links/5ac1c798a6fdcccda65df47f/Molecular-Identification-of-Trypanosomes-and-Their-Effects-on-Hematological-and-Biochemical-Parameters-in-Donkeys-in-Punjab-Pakistan.pdf}

Tsetse-borne species of trypanosomes have entered zoos outside the traditional tsetse zone in infected animals imported for the zoo.

== Bibliography ==
- Thomas, H Wolferstan (1905). Report on trypanosomes, trypanosomiasis, and sleeping sickness: being an experimental investigation into their pathology and treatment. London: University Press of Liverpool. OCLC 11692559.
- Manson, Patrick (1914). Tropical diseases: a manual of diseases of warm climates (5th ed.). New York: William Wood. OCLC 812165069.
- Daniels, Charles Wilberforce (1914). Tropical Medicine and Hygiene. New York. OCLC 810109334.
- Maudlin, Ian; Holmes, Peter; Miles, Michael W (2004). The trypanosomiases. Wallingford, UK; Cambridge, Massachusetts: CABI Publishing. ISBN 978-0-85199-034-7. OCLC 58543155.
