= T. suis =

T. suis may refer to:

- Trichuris suis, a worm species used in helminthic therapy
- Trypanosoma suis, a protozoan species that causes one form of the surra disease in pigs
