= Trypanosoma rangeli =

Scientific classification
- Domain: Eukaryota
- Clade: Discoba
- Phylum: Euglenozoa
- Class: Kinetoplastea
- Order: Trypanosomatida
- Family: Trypanosomatidae
- Genus: Trypanosoma
- Subgenus: Aneza
- Species: T. rangeli

Binomial name
- Trypanosoma rangeli Tejera, 1920

Species of flagellated protist

Trypanosoma rangeli is a species of hemoflagellate excavate parasites of the genus Trypanosoma. Although infecting a variety of mammalian species in a wide geographical area in Central and South America, this parasite is considered non-pathogenic to these hosts. T. rangeli is transmitted by bite of infected triatomine bugs of the Reduviidae family, commonly known as barbeiro, winchuka (vinchuca), chinche, pito or chupão. The only triatomine insects that T. rangeli is able to produce infective forms in are those from the genus Rhodnius.

The genome was published in September 2014.

Occurring in sympatry with Trypanosoma cruzi, the etiological agent of Chagas disease, in wide geographical areas in the Americas, T. rangeli shares hosts, vectors and a large amount of its antigenic coat with T. cruzi leading to misdiagnosis of Chagas disease.

== Bibliography ==
- Bayer-Santos, E; Sincero, TCM; Stoco, PH; et al. (2007). "Trends on Trypanosoma (Herpeto-soma) rangeli research". Acta Biol Venez. 26: 35–47.
- Silva, FM; Noyes, H; Campaner, M; et al. (2004). "Phylogeny, taxonomy and grouping of Trypanosoma rangeli isolates from man, triatomines and sylvatic mammals from widespread geographical origin based on SSU and ITS ribosomal sequences". Parasitology. 129 (5): 549–561. doi:10.1017/S0031182004005931. PMID 15552400. S2CID 15338470.
- Grisard, EC; Steindel, M; Guarneri, AA; et al. (1999). "Characterization of Trypanosoma rangeli strains isolated in Central and South America: an overview". Mem Inst Oswaldo Cruz. 94 (2): 203–209. doi:10.1590/s0074-02761999000200015. PMID 10224529.
- Guhl, F; Vallejo, GA (2003). "Trypanosoma (Herpetosoma) rangeli Tejera, 1920: an updated review". Mem Inst Oswaldo Cruz. 98 (4): 435–442. doi:10.1590/s0074-02762003000400001. hdl:1807/8078. PMID 12937750.
- Meneguetti, DU; Soares, EB; Campaner, M; et al. (2014). "First report of Rhodnius montene-grensis (Hemiptera: Reduviidae: Triatominae) infection by Trypanosoma rangeli". Rev Soc Bras Med Trop. 47 (3): 374–376. doi:10.1590/0037-8682-0179-2013. PMID 24728471.
- Meirelles, RMS; Henriques-Pons, A; Soares, MJ; et al. (2005). "Penetration of the salivary glands of Rhodnius domesticus Neiva & Pinto, 1923 (Hemiptera: Reduviidae) by Trypa-nosoma rangeli Tejera, 1920 (Protozoa: Kinetoplastida)". Parasitol Res. 97 (4): 259–269. doi:10.1007/s00436-005-1433-4. PMID 15997404. S2CID 8717723.
- Steindel, M; Dias Neto, E; Ribeiro-Rodrigues, R; et al. (1994). "Randomly amplified polymorphic DNA (RAPD) and isoenzyme analysis of Trypanosoma rangeli strains". J Euk Microbiol. 41 (3): 261–267. doi:10.1111/j.1550-7408.1994.tb01506.x. PMID 8049688. S2CID 30482291.
- Stoco, PH; Wagner, G; Gerber, A; et al. (2014). "Genome of the Avirulent Human-infective Trypanosome – Trypanosoma rangeli". PLOS Negl Trop Dis. 8 (9) e3176. doi:10.1371/journal.pntd.0003176. PMC 4169256. PMID 25233456.
- Urrea, DA; Carranza, JC; Cuba, CA; et al. (2005). "Molecular characterisation of Trypanosoma rangeli strains isolated from Rhodnius ecuadoriensis in Peru, R. colombiensis in Colombia and R. pallescens in Panama, supports a co-evolutionary association between parasites and vectors". Infect Genet Evol. 5 (2): 123–129. doi:10.1016/j.meegid.2004.07.005. PMID 15639744.
