= Trypanosoma vivax =

Scientific classification
- Domain: Eukaryota
- Clade: Discoba
- Phylum: Euglenozoa
- Class: Kinetoplastea
- Order: Trypanosomatida
- Family: Trypanosomatidae
- Genus: Trypanosoma
- Subgenus: Duttonella
- Species: T. vivax

Binomial name
- Trypanosoma vivax Ziemann, 1905

Synonyms
- Trypanosoma caprae; Trypanosoma angolense

Protozoan parasite, cause of nagana

Trypanosoma vivax is a parasite species in the genus Trypanosoma. It causes the disease nagana, affecting cattle or wild mammals. It is mainly occurs in West Africa, although it has spread to South America.

== Range ==
Historically restricted to sub-Saharan Africa especially West Africa, it has spread to 13 countries of South America. This has been made easier by its mechanical transmission route, see § Life cycle below.

== Hosts ==
Hosts include, cattle, horses, sheep, and camels. As of 2016 in South America it is an emerging pathogen of cattle, and sometimes horses and other ruminants.

The vector host is Glossina.

== Life cycle ==
Unusual for a trypanosome, T. vivax does not infect the Glossina vector midgut. Instead it infects and completes an abbreviated life cycle only in the vector's proboscis. Thus it is entirely mechanically transmitted. For this reason it has had a relatively easy time jumping vectors, and thereby even jumping geographic ranges which do not have its customary vector.

== Symptoms ==
Symptoms of T. vivax include "rapid weight loss, lethargy, weakness, clumsiness, pale mucosa, swelling of superficial lymph nodes, anemia, and fluctuating pyrexia, causing[...]a drop in animal productivity."

== Enzymes ==
A novel proline racemase of medical and veterinary importance has been described in T. vivax (B8LFE4).

It also produces vivapain, a cysteine peptidase.

== Host immunity ==
The smallest variable surface glycoprotein (40 kDa in size) to date has been found in T. vivax, which bears little carbohydrate.

== Economic impact ==
Trypanosoma vivax is a significant drag on Africa's cattle production every year, and increasingly is a concern in South America: One outbreak in 1995 in the Pantanal in Brazil and Bolivia cost the industry over US$160 million.

== Trypanocide resistance ==
Some resistance to trypanocides has been observed: Some African countries have isometamidium-resistant populations, with some of these also being resistant to diminazene. (This has been ascribed variously to cross-resistance or to two separate events of acquisition of separate resistance genetics. Isometamidium and diminazene are not thought to be in the same trypanocide class.) Resistance to both is widespread in both West and East Africa. Diminazene resistance has been observed in South America.

Mechanisms of resistance are not necessarily shared across the genus, and this is especially true for this, the most genetically divergent species.
