= Animal trypanosomiasis =

Parasitic disease of vertebrates

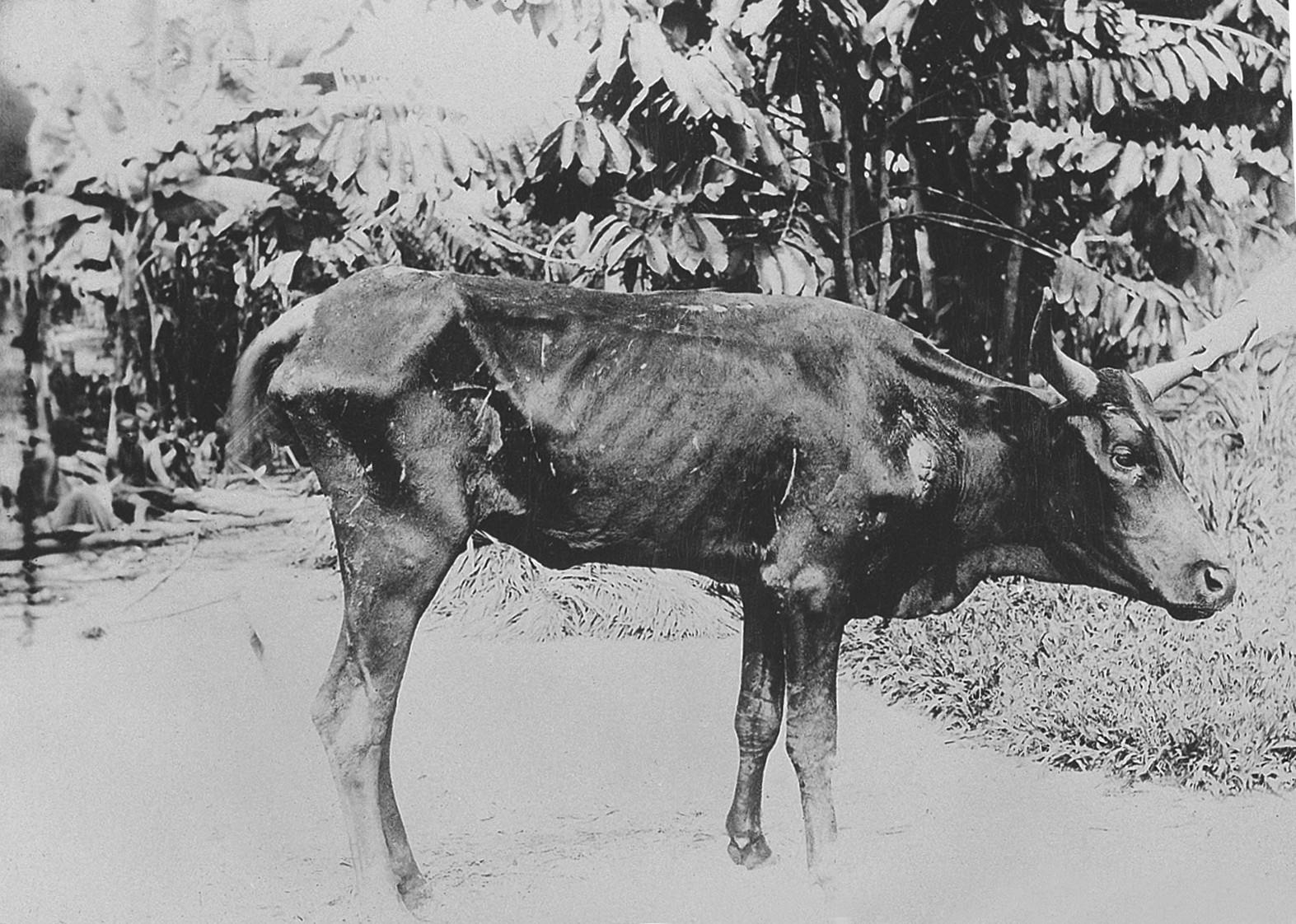
Steer with bovine trypanosomiasis

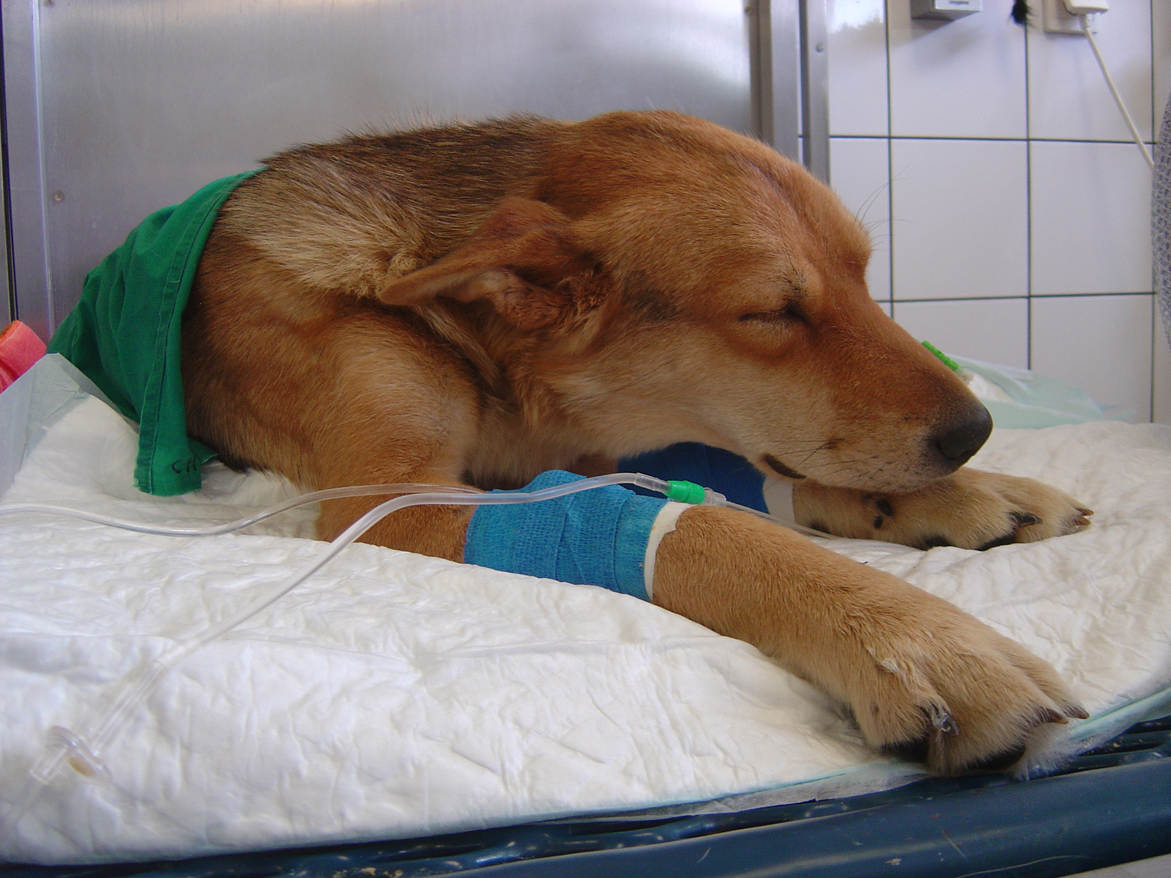
Cachectic dog infested with T. congolense after travel in West Africa

Animal trypanosomiasis, also known as nagana and nagana pest, or sleeping sickness, is a disease of non-human vertebrates. The disease is caused by trypanosomes of several species in the genus Trypanosoma such as T. brucei (which also infects humans to cause African Sleeping Sickness), T. vivax (which causes nagana in livestock mainly in sub-Saharan Africa, although it has also spread to South America), T. congolense and T. simiae. The trypanosomes infect the blood of the vertebrate host, causing fever, weakness, and lethargy, which lead to weight loss and anemia. In some animals, the disease is fatal if not treated. In sub-Saharan Africa, trypanosomes are transmitted by tsetse flies, which occur in more than 35 countries.

An interesting feature is the remarkable tolerance to nagana pathology shown by some breeds of cattle, notably the N'Dama – a West African Bos taurus breed. This contrasts with the susceptibility shown by East African B. indicus cattle such as the zebu.

== Transmission ==
Most trypanosomes develop in tsetse flies (Glossina spp.), its biological vector, in about one to a few weeks. When an infected tsetse fly bites an animal, the parasites are transmitted through its saliva. It can also be spread by fomites such as surgical instruments, needles, and syringes. The most important non-Glossina vectors are thought to be horseflies (Tabanidae spp.) and stable flies (Stomoxys spp.).

The immune response of animals may be unable to eliminate trypanosomes completely, and the host may become an inapparent carrier. These inapparent infections can be reactivated if the animal is stressed. Transplacental transmission can also occur.

Transmission was successfully halted on Zanzibar by sterile insect technique (SIT) of the vector Glossina austeni.

== Signs and symptoms ==
The incubation period ranges from four days to approximately eight weeks. The infection leads to significant weight loss and anemia. Various symptoms are observed, including fever, oedema, adenitis, dermatitis and nervous disorders. The disease cannot be diagnosed with certainty except physically detecting parasites by blood microscopic examination or various serological reactions.

== Vectors ==
Disease	Species affected	Trypanosoma agents	Distribution	Glossina vectors
Nagana – acute form	antelope cattle camels horses	T. brucei brucei	Africa	G. morsitans G. swynnertoni G. pallidipes G. palpalis G. tachinoides G. fuscipes
Nagana – chronic form	cattle camels horses	T. congolense	Africa	G. palpalis G. morsitans G. austeni G. swynnertoni G. pallidipes G. longipalpis G. tachinoides G. brevipalpis
Nagana – acute form	domestic pigs cattle camels horses	T. simiae	Africa	G. palpalis G. fuscipes G. morsitans G. tachinoides G. longipalpis G. fusca G. tabaniformis G. brevipalpis G. vanhoofi G. austeni
Nagana – acute form	cattle camels horses	T. vivax	Africa	G. morsitans G. palpalis G. tachinoides G. swynnertoni G. pallidipes G. austeni G. vanhoofi G. longipalpis

== Control measures ==
Trypanocidal antiparasitic drugs are the main tool used in Africa to control animal trypanosomiasis. Some drugs can prevent the disease, and are called prophylactic drugs. These can be very effective in protecting animals during the times they are highly exposed to diseases. However, historically these drugs were not always used properly, leading to some resistance. Recently, efforts are being made to bring new trypanocides to the African market, although challenges to entry persist. Tsetse fly populations can be reduced or eliminated by traps and insecticides. The tsetse habitat can be destroyed by alteration of vegetation, although this approach is no longer deliberately adopted for environmental reasons. In most settings, an integrated, community-based approach to animal trypanosomiasis control is recommended, whereby the control of vectors is combined with the rational use of drugs under the overall guidance and supervision of the national veterinary services.

Waterbuck, among other animals, produces chemical odours that repel tsetse flies. This has led to the development of collars that store and gradually release these chemicals, reducing tsetse attack and thus trypanosomiasis incidence for cattle wearing these collars.

== Economic impact ==
Although the loss of direct livestock products (meat, milk, and blood) is problematic, the greatest impact of livestock trypanosomiasis is the loss of crop productivity due to loss of the animals' draught power in the field.

== Epidemiology ==
As with other infectious diseases, climate change will have an effect on the distribution and the risk of transmission of animal trypanosomiasis. However, it depends on the geographical region, disease-carrying species, the exact climate change scenario, and many other factors whether there will be a decrease or increase in animal trypanosomiasis.
