= Trypanosoma irwini =

Scientific classification
- Domain: Eukaryota
- Clade: Discoba
- Phylum: Euglenozoa
- Class: Kinetoplastea
- Order: Trypanosomatida
- Family: Trypanosomatidae
- Genus: Trypanosoma
- Subgenus: incertae sedis
- Species: T. irwini

Binomial name
- Trypanosoma irwini McInnes, Gillett, Ryan, Austen, Campbell, Hanger & Reid, 2009

Blood parasite of koalas named after Steve Irwin

Trypanosoma irwini is a blood parasite of koalas. First discovered in 2009 by Linda M. McInnes and her peers, it was named in honor of Steve Irwin, "The Crocodile Hunter". The study done by McInnes et al. was the first to describe a Trypanosoma species from koalas.

== Taxonomic summary ==
- Vertebrate host: Koalas (Phascolarctos cinereus)
- Invertebrate host: None currently known
- Type location: New South Wales, Australia
- Other locations: A range of locations in Queensland, Australia
- Site of infection: blood

== Host ==
The six main morphologies of trypanosomatids

The koala (Phascolarctos cinereus) is distributed in patches throughout the eastern regions of Australia. The International Union for Conservation of Nature and Natural Resources (IUCN) listed the koala as potentially vulnerable in 1992, and the New South Wales Threatened Species Conservation Act of 1995 and the Queensland Nature Conservation Regulation Act of 2006 categorized the koala as vulnerable to extinction in New South Wales and Queensland.

Over the years, the koala population has experienced a loss of genetic diversity through population bottlenecks and founder effects. To combat the loss in diversity, IUCN has released captive koalas into the wild to reintroduce the species. Nonetheless, a significant reduction in the koala population over the past 200 years is apparent.

== Description ==
The vector for this parasite is currently unknown, although trypanosome vectors are generally blood-eating arthropods such as mosquitoes, ticks, fleas, mites, and flies. It is likely that the life cycle of T. irwini is similar to that of other Trypanosomes: alternating between sexual (vector host) and asexual (vertebrate host). T. irwini was found in the blood of koalas with the trypomastigote morphology.

Measurements determined from nine T. irwini trypomastigotes
Feature	Observed range(μm)	Mean ± s.e.(μm)
Total length	32.1–38.7	36.6±0.7
Breadth	1.9–4.5	3.0±0.3
PK	3.0–52	3.6±0.3
KN	6.0–12.1	10.3±0.6
NA	8.4–16.2	11.9±0.8
FF	8.6–12.8	10.3±0.9

- Total length: body length measured along mid-line including free flagellum (total length)
- Breadth: maximum breadth measured at nucleus level (including undulating membrane)
- PK: distance between the posterior end and the kinetoplast
- KN: distance between the kinetoplast and posterior edge of the nucleus
- NA: distance between the anterior edge of the nucleus and the anterior end of the body
- FF: length of the free flagellum

== Phylogeny ==
Phylogeny analysis of the 18S rDNA and gGADPH loci that T. Irwini is genetically closest to Trypanosoma bennetti, which is an avian trypanosome. Further comparison of the 18S rDNA sequences against the data available in the Genbank shows that T. irwini can be grouped with Trypanosoma minasense, which is a trypanosome of neotropical primates collected from Australian marsupials.

== Pathogenicity ==
The pathogenicity of Trypanosoma irwini is unclear.

== Diagnosis ==
Blood smears show Trypanosoma irwini parasites with physical characteristics resembling the trypomastigote stage of other well-known trypanosomatids. These organisms are long and thin, consisting of a pointy posterior and a long free flagellum. They have an undulating membrane, a kinetoplast, and a nucleus.

== In vitro culture ==
This parasite has not yet been successfully cultured in vitro.

== Symptoms ==
According to the study done by McInnes et al., the sentinel koala exhibited signs of depression, weakness, pale mucous membrane, and keratoconjunctivitis. Other clinical findings include anemia, and cytological exam of bone marrow shows erythroid hyperplasia. The koala examined for the study was euthanized due to liver and kidney failure. A post-mortem examination revealed osteochondromas in the ribs, lymphoid atrophy, extensive periacinar necrosis of the liver, interstitial nephritis, extramedullary hematopoiesis of the spleen, and other problems. While not all of these clinical and pathological findings are consistent with symptoms and signs of trypanosomiasis, those that suggest extravascular hemolysis and generalized immune reaction are.

== Gallery ==
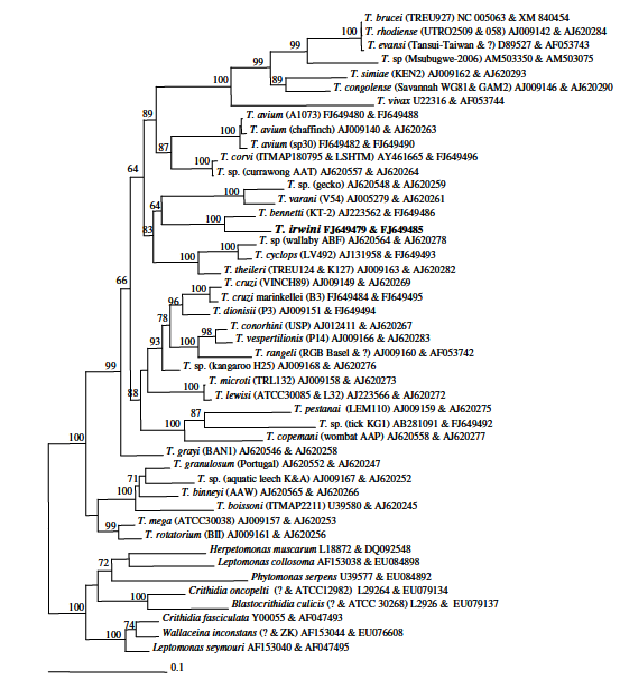
Phylogenetic analysis of Trypanosoma ssp. and T. irwini using partial sequence analysis of 18S rDNA and gGAPDH

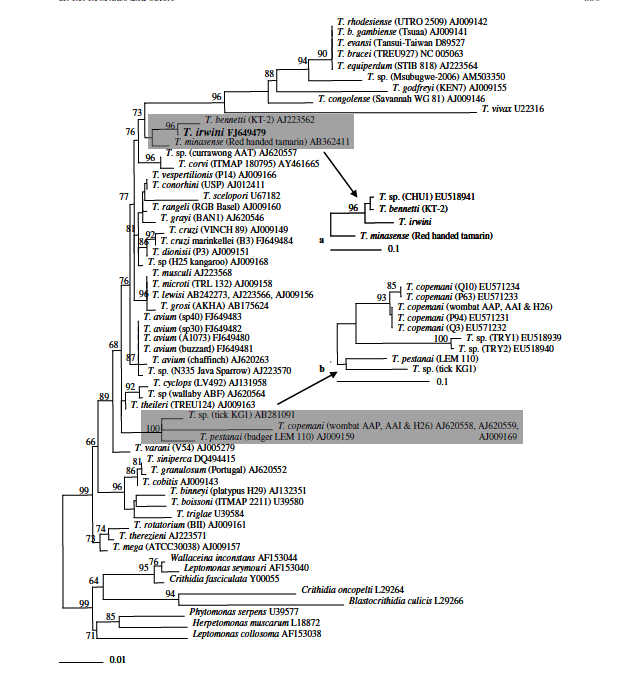
Phylogenetic analysis of Trypanosoma ssp. and T. irwini using partial sequence analysis of 18S rDNA

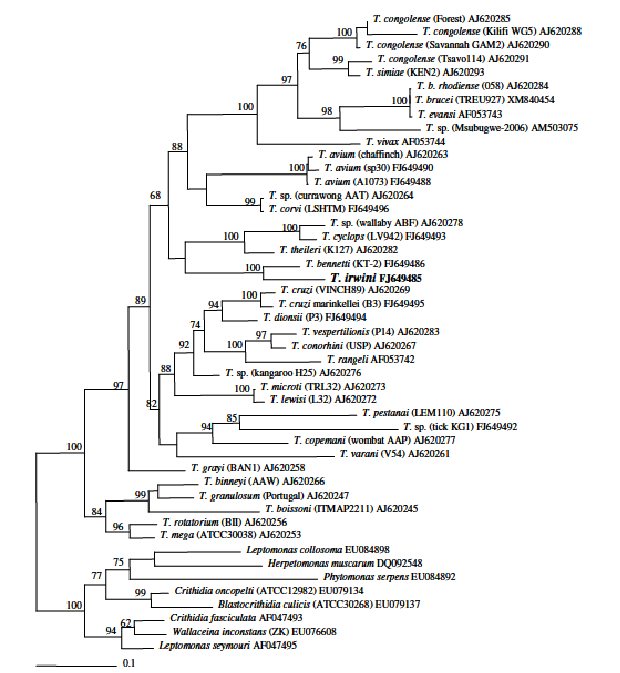
Phylogenetic analysis of Trypanosoma ssp. and T. irwini using partial sequence analysis gGAPDH

== See also ==
- List of organisms named after famous people (born 1950–1974)
