= N'Dama =

Breed of cattle

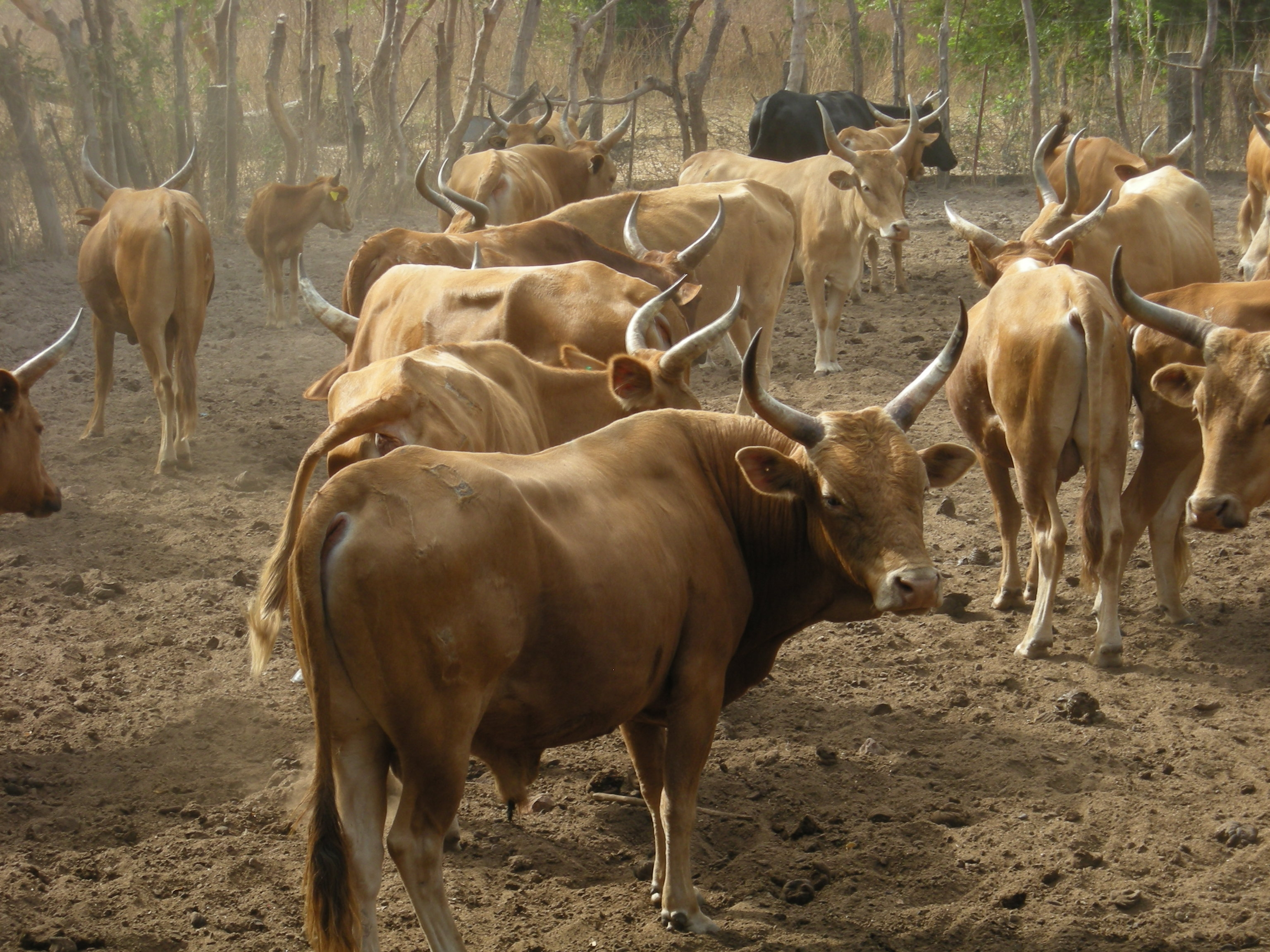
An N'Dama herd in West Africa

N'Dama is a breed of cattle from West Africa. Other names for them include Boenca or Boyenca (Guinea-Bissau), Fouta Jallon, Djallonké or Djallonké cattle, Fouta Longhorn, Fouta Malinke, Futa, Malinke, Mandingo (Liberia), and N'Dama Petite (Senegal). Originating in the Guinea highlands, they are also found in southern Senegal, Guinea-Bissau, the Gambia, Mali, Ivory Coast, Liberia, Nigeria, and Sierra Leone. They are trypanotolerant, allowing them to be kept in tsetse fly-infested areas. They also show superior resistance to ticks and the diseases they carry and to Haemonchus contortus stomach worms.

The Senepol breed of beef cattle developed on the Caribbean Island of St. Croix was long thought to originate from crosses between N'Dama cattle, imported in the late 19th century, and Red Poll cattle, but it is actually an admixed breed between a European taurina (Red Poll), zebu, and N'Dama.

== Reproduction ==
The age of first calving is 3.5 years in Upper Casamance and is slightly lower in Lower and Middle Casamance. The calving interval is 16 to 17 months in Middle and Upper Casamance and roughly 19 months in Lower Casamance with 80% of calving taking place in the last six months of the year. The abortion rate is 10 to 20%, which leaves an average calving rate of 56%. Calves are weaned around 12 months and castration, when it occurs, is around three years. Annual mortality rate is 12% overall, with 30% for calves under one year, 15% for one to two-year-olds, 5% for two to three-year-olds, and 2% for adults.

== Trypanotolerance in N'Dama cattle ==
Trypanosomiasis poses a considerable constraint on livestock agricultural development in Tsetse fly infested areas of sub Saharan Africa, especially in west and central Africa. International research conducted by ILRI in Nigeria, the Democratic Republic of the Congo and Kenya has shown that the N'Dama is the most resistant breed. In Nigeria, research has shown that N'Dama is up to 2-3x (or 25%) more resistant than Nguni cattle. And F1 N'Dama x Nguni 16.5% better than pure Nguni. While in Kenya research conducted by KALRO has shown a similarity with crossbreeding N'Dama x Boran cattle.
