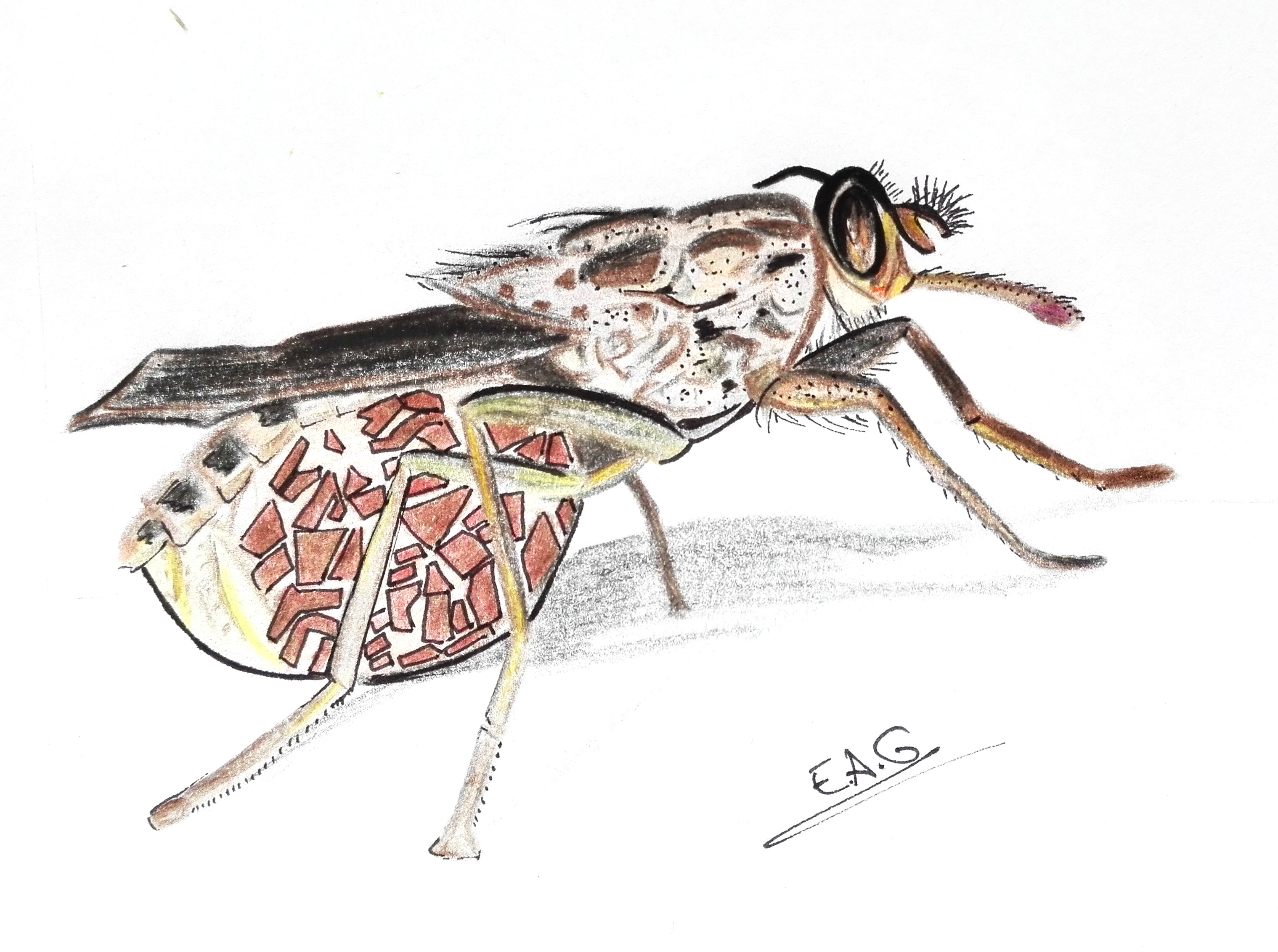

Scientific classification
- Kingdom: Animalia
- Phylum: Arthropoda
- Clade: Pancrustacea
- Class: Insecta
- Order: Diptera
- Family: Glossinidae
- Genus: Glossina
- Species: G. morsitans

Binomial name
- Glossina morsitans Westwood, 1851
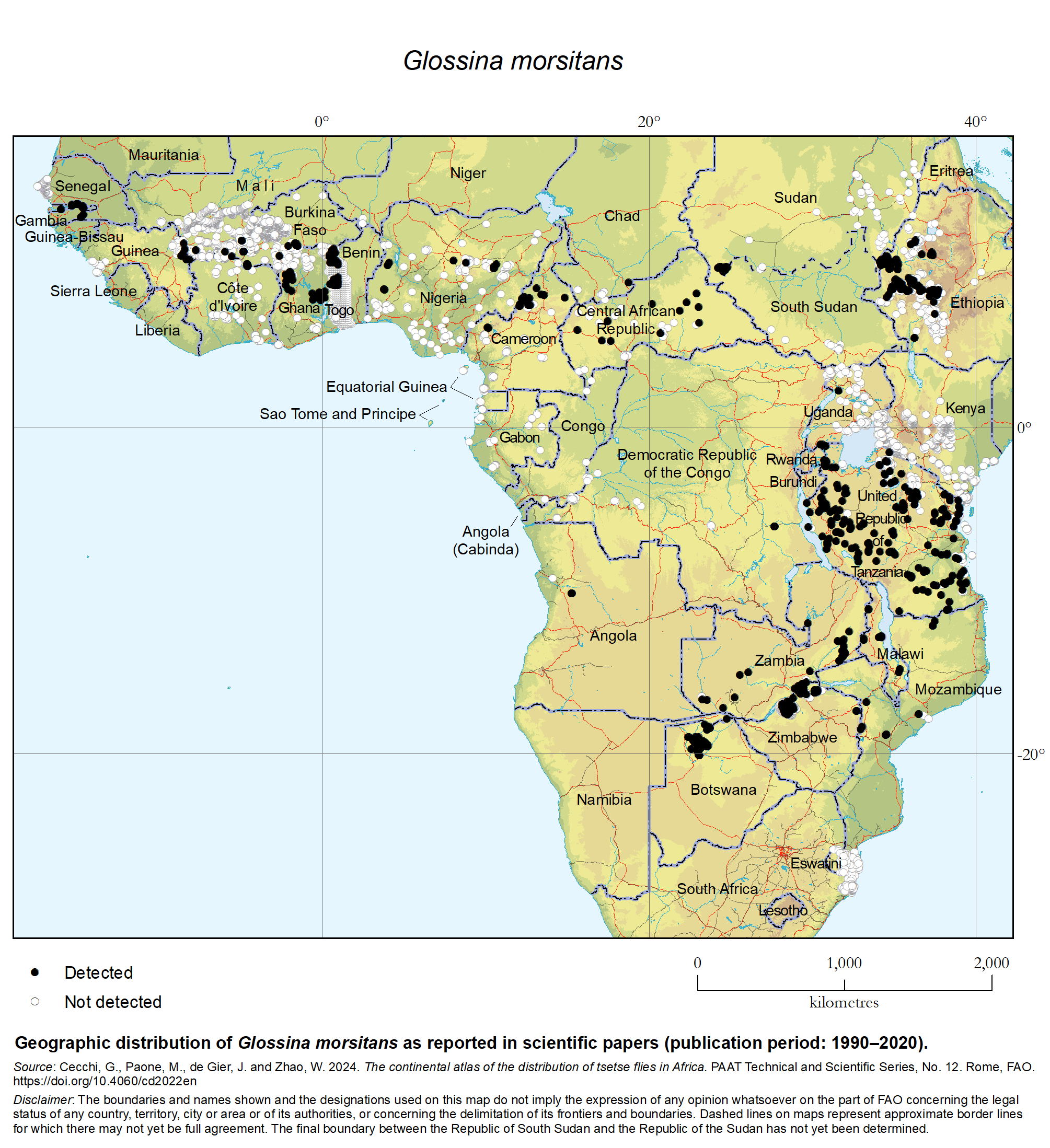
- Geographic distribution of Glossina morsitans as reported in scientific papers – Publication period 1990–2020

= Glossina morsitans =

Species of tsetse fly

Glossina morsitans is a species of tsetse fly (genus Glossina). It is one of the major vectors of Trypanosoma brucei rhodesiense in African savannas.

== Taxonomy ==
Glossina morsitans is variously classified into the subgenus Glossina s.s. or as the name species of the morsitans species group. Three subspecies are traditionally recognized for G. morsitans:

1. G. m. submorsitans
2. G. m. morsitans
3. G. m. centralis

G.m.s. is further subdivided by some authors into a G. m. s. ugandensis.

== Morphology ==
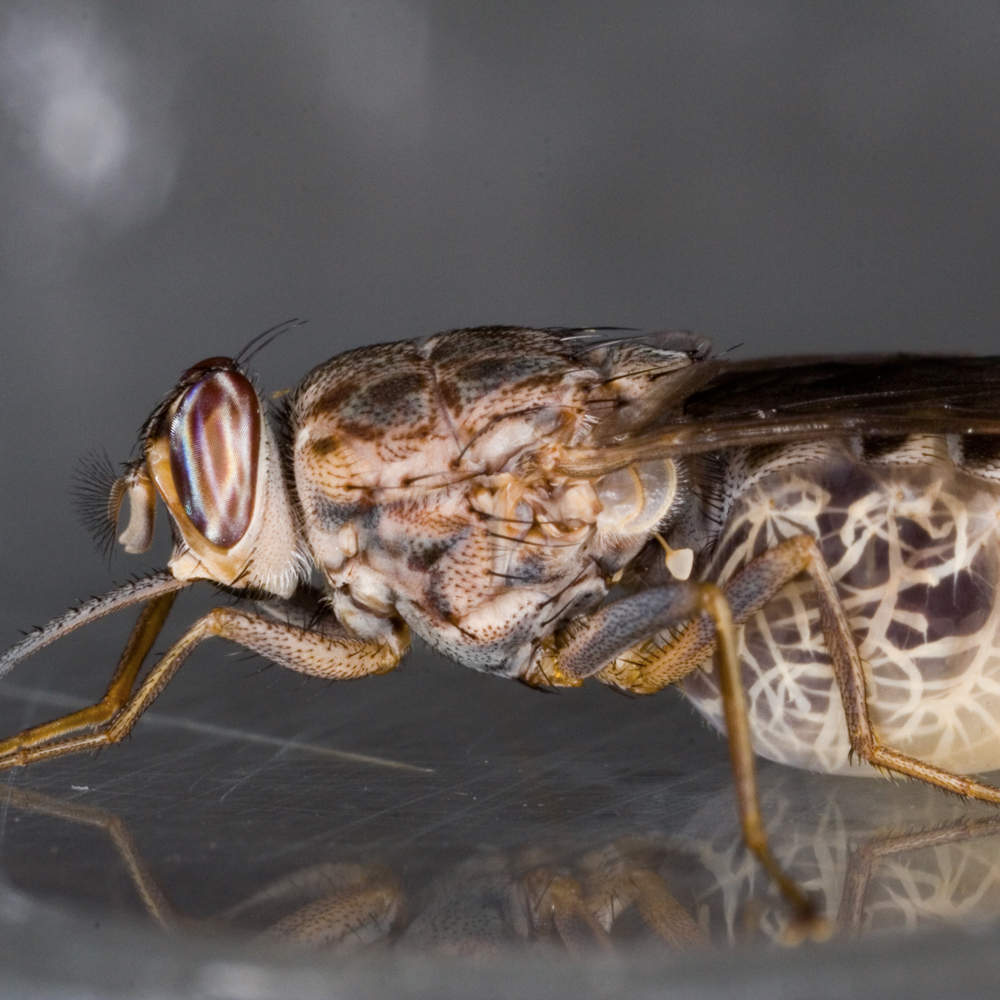
Pregnant female

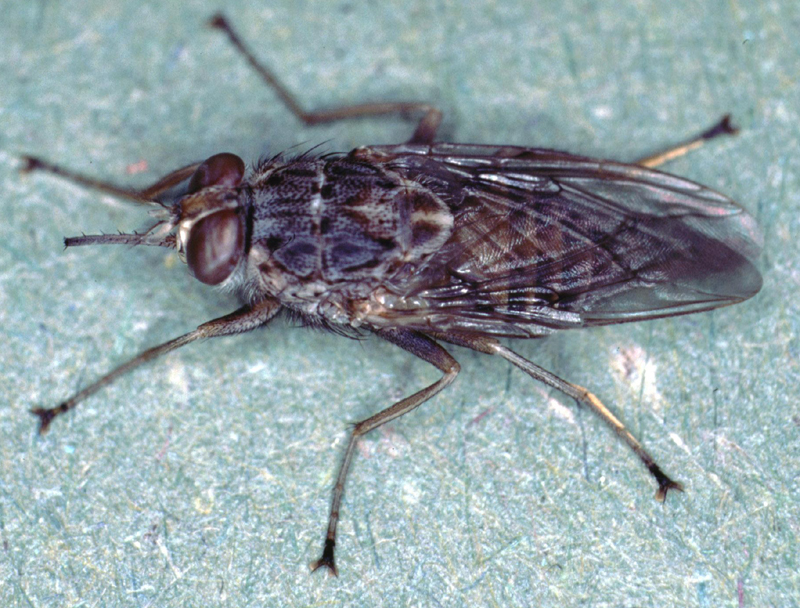
Adult tsetse fly

=== Egg ===
About 1.5–1.6 millimetres (15/256–1/16 in) long.

=== Larvae ===
==== First instar ====
1.8 millimetres (5/64 in) long.

==== Second instar ====
4.5 millimetres (11/64 in) long.

==== Third instar ====
6–7 millimetres (15/64–9/32 in) long.

==== Adult ====
Adults are 7.75 millimetres (5/16 in). G. morsitans is occasionally distinguishable from congeners by the unaided eye - there are differences in gross coloration - if it can be observed resting. It is more readily distinguishable by microscopic examination.

== Metabolism ==
Flight muscles are primarily powered by proline, which is synthesized from fatty acids mobilised out of the fat body. Proline is so efficiently used in muscle mitochondria because they are specialised towards proline oxidising enzymes, and away from enzymes using fatty acids and pyruvate.

== Distribution ==
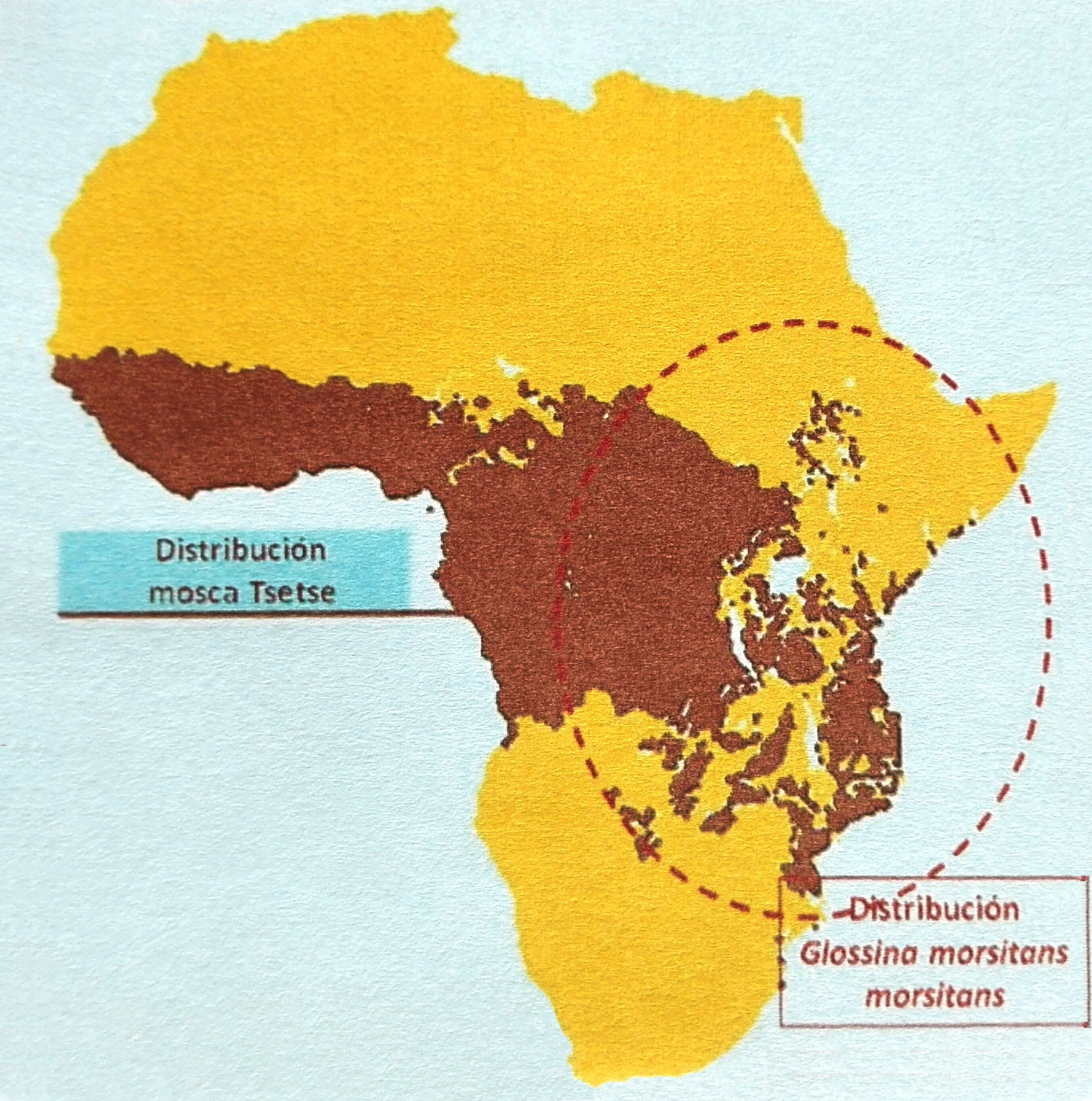

G. morsitans is found in East Africa and Equatorial Africa.

It is the tsetse species that is presently reported from the highest number of African countries, i.e. at least 23 including: Angola, Burkina Faso, Cameroon, Central African Republic, Chad, Côte d'Ivoire, Democratic Republic of the Congo, Ethiopia, Gambia, Ghana, Guinea, Malawi, Mali, Mozambique, Nigeria, Rwanda, Senegal, Sudan, Tanzania, Togo, Uganda, Zambia and Zimbabwe.

The species was also historically reported in Benin, Burundi, Guinea-Bissau, Kenya, Niger, Sierra Leone and South Sudan, although recent published data for the species in these countries is lacking. G. morsitans was also present in Botswana and Namibia, but the species is believed to have been sustainably eliminated in these two countries by means of aerial spraying of insecticide.

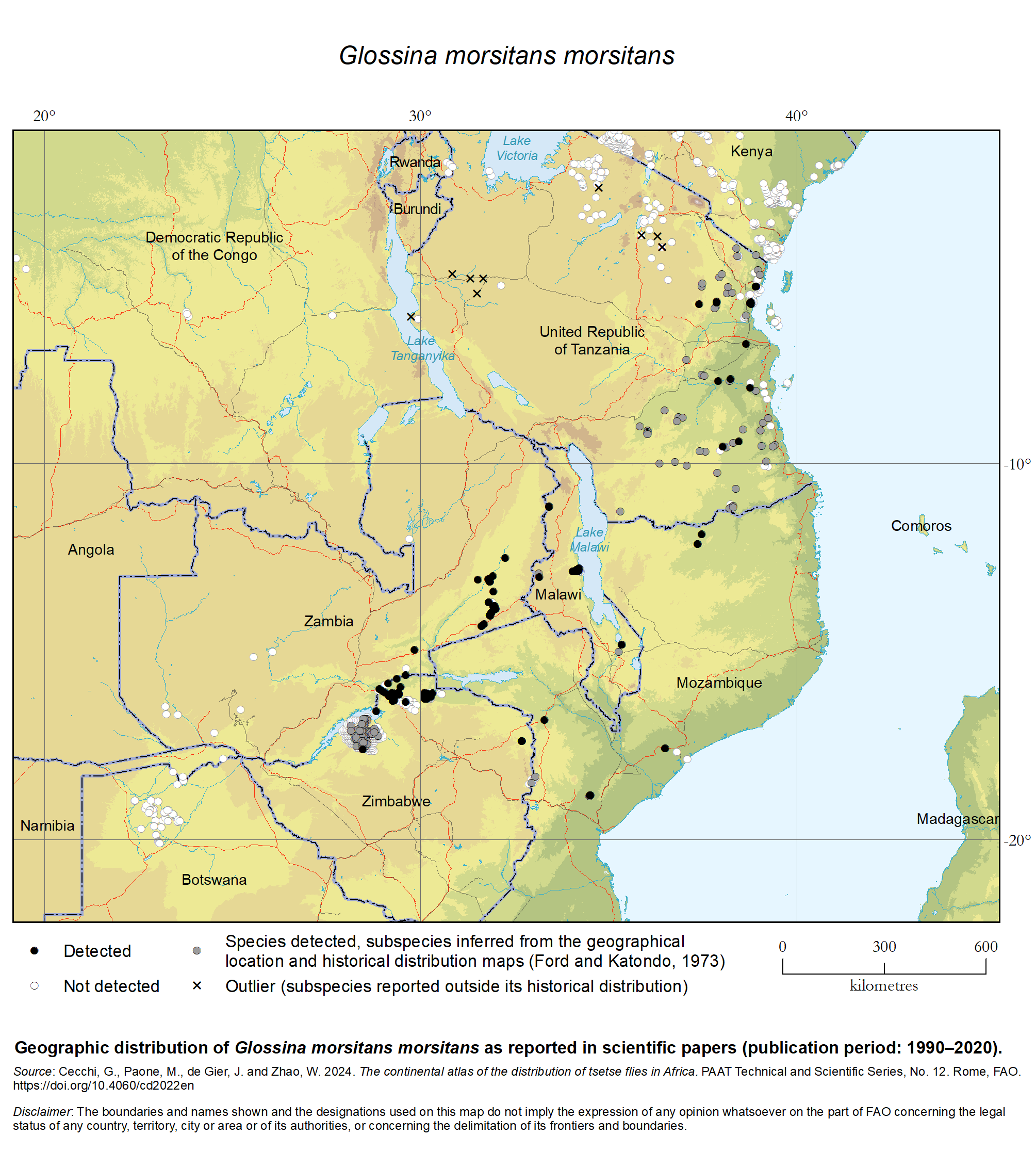
Geographic distribution of Glossina morsitans morsitans as reported in scientific papers –Publication period 1990–2020

=== Glossina morsitans morsitans ===
Glossina morsitans morsitans occupies the south-eastern part of the distribution of Glossina morsitans, and historically it was known to be present in Malawi, Mozambique, the United Republic of Tanzania, Zambia and Zimbabwe. In the peer-reviewed scientific literature for the period 1990–2020, Glossina morsitans morsitans was confirmed in all 5 countries.

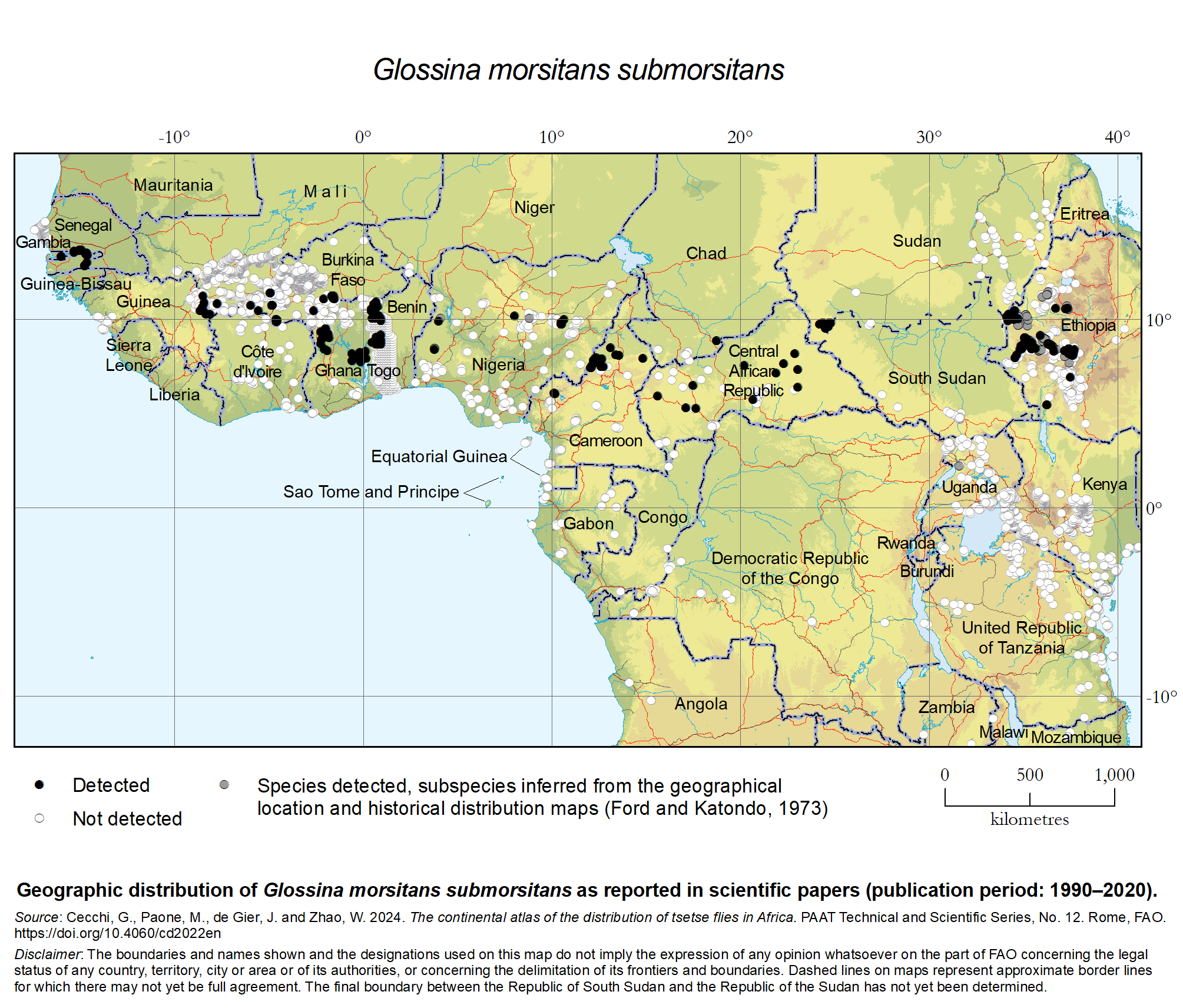
Geographic distribution of Glossina morsitans submorsitans as reported in scientific papers – Publication period 1990–2020

=== Glossina morsitans submorsitans ===
Glossina morsitans submorsitans occupies the northern part of the distribution of Glossina morsitans, and historically it was known to be present in 22 countries, from Ethiopia in the East to Senegal in the West. In the peer-reviewed scientific literature for the period 1990–2020, Glossina morsitans submorsitans was explicitly reported from 13 countries, i.e. Burkina Faso, Cameroon, the Central African Republic, Chad, Ethiopia, the Gambia, Ghana, Guinea, Mali, Nigeria, Senegal, Sudan, and Togo. In 2026, the subspecies was also confirmed in Côte d'Ivoire. Glossina morsitans submorsitans is also believed to have been detected in Uganda in the early 2010s, even though inadvertently reported as G. morsitans morsitans, while no published report of G. morsitans submorsitans occurrence is available for the period 1990–2020 from other historically infested countries (i.e. Benin, the Democratic Republic of the Congo, Guinea-Bissau, Kenya, Niger, Sierra Leone and South Sudan.

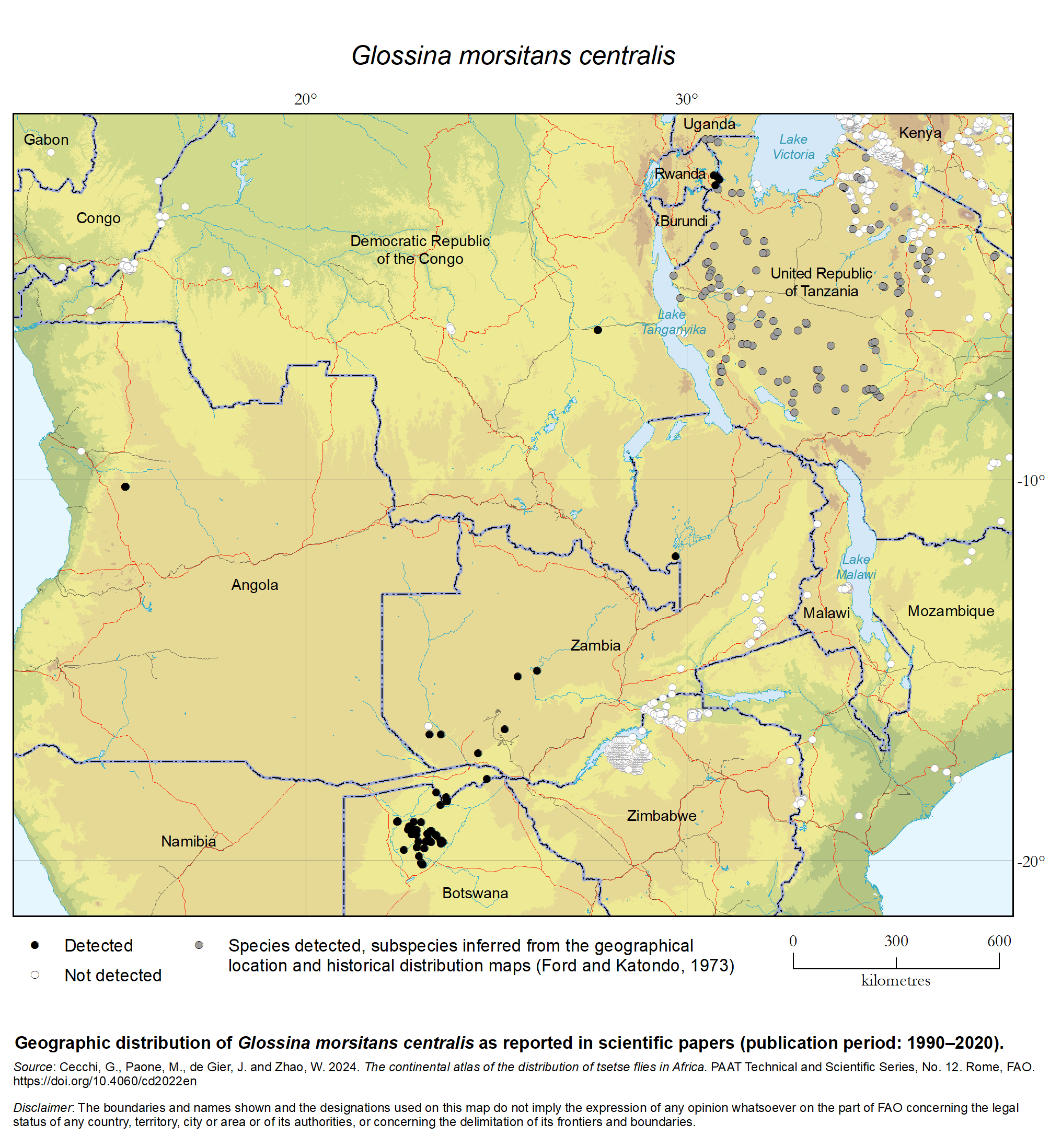
Geographic distribution of Glossina morsitans centralis as reported in scientific papers – Publication period 1990–2020

=== Glossina morsitans centralis ===
Glossina morsitans centralis occupies the south-western part of the distribution of Glossina morsitans, and historically it was known to be present in Angola, Botswana, Burundi, the Democratic Republic of the Congo, Namibia, Rwanda, Uganda, the United Republic of Tanzania and Zambia. In the peer-reviewed scientific literature for the period 1990–2020, Glossina morsitans centralis was explicitly reported from 6 countries, i.e. Angola, Botswana, the Democratic Republic of the Congo, Namibia, Rwanda, and Zambia. In the period 1990–2020, Glossina morsitans centralis was also reported, albeit at the species level (i.e. as Glossina morsitans), from the United Republic of Tanzania, in areas where the subspecies was historically known to occur. As regards Botswana and Namibia, notwithstanding earlier reports, G. morsitans centralis is believed to have been sustainably eliminated in the years 2000s by means of aerial spraying of insecticide (the sequential aerosol technique).

== Hosts ==
G. morsitans feeds upon warthogs, oxen, buffaloes, kudus, and humans. About 6% of G. m. s.'s bloodmeals come from birds (excluding ostriches).

== Genome ==
A sequence was made available in 2014. Among other results this reveals that G. morsitans's genome has incorporated some of its Wolbachia symbiont's genome (see also § Symbionts below). The sense of taste of G. m. m. lacks the sense of sweetness – which may be due to its exclusively hematophagous diet.

=== Genetics ===
G. morsitans carries three Ago2 genes according to data compiled by Mongelli & Saleh 2016 and three Ago3 genes.

== Symbionts ==
G. m. m. is in obligate symbiosis with Wigglesworthia glossinidia and Wolbachia. Without Wigglesworthia, G. m. m. is sterile, and without Wolbachia they are reproductively incompatible with normal flies.

== Economic impact ==
Trypanosomiasis transmitted by G. morsitans and other tsetse species is one of the largest economic problems Africa faces. It has radically altered the cattle agroeconomy across the middle of Africa, severely shrinking the cattle pastoral lifestyle by shrinking the extent of safe grazing lands. This has left about 10,400,000 square kilometres (4,000,000 sq mi) of otherwise usable land devoid of cattle. Raising cattle in the manner common in 1963, this would have allowed for another 125,000,000 head - more than doubling the 114,000,000 being raised at the time.
