= Trypanosoma tungarae =

Scientific classification
- Domain: Eukaryota
- Clade: Discoba
- Phylum: Euglenozoa
- Class: Kinetoplastea
- Order: Trypanosomatida
- Family: Trypanosomatidae
- Genus: Trypanosoma
- Subgenus: Trypanosoma
- Species: T. tungarae

Binomial name
- Trypanosoma tungarae Bernal & Pinto, 2016

Species of protozoan parasite

Trypanosoma tungarae is a species of giant trypanosome, a protozoal parasite, which infects the túngara frog and is thought to be transmitted by members of the midge genus Corethrella. It was discovered in 2016.

== Discovery ==
Trypanosoma tungarae was discovered from studies of trypanosome species recovered from the blood of túngara frogs from Gamboa in the Colón Province of Panama. The species has yet to be observed in other locations.

== Description ==
Trypanosoma tungarae trypomastigotes are large, with a relatively long thin body (52 μm). They appear morphologically similar to other frog trypanosomes from Central and South America, such as Trypanososma rotatorium and Trypanosoma ranarum.

== Phylogeny ==
Phylogenetic studies of the 18S ribosomal RNA gene show that the novel species is most closely related to Trypanosoma chattoni, which has a rounded body that looks completely different from that of T. tungarae, with neither an undulating membrane nor a free flagellum.

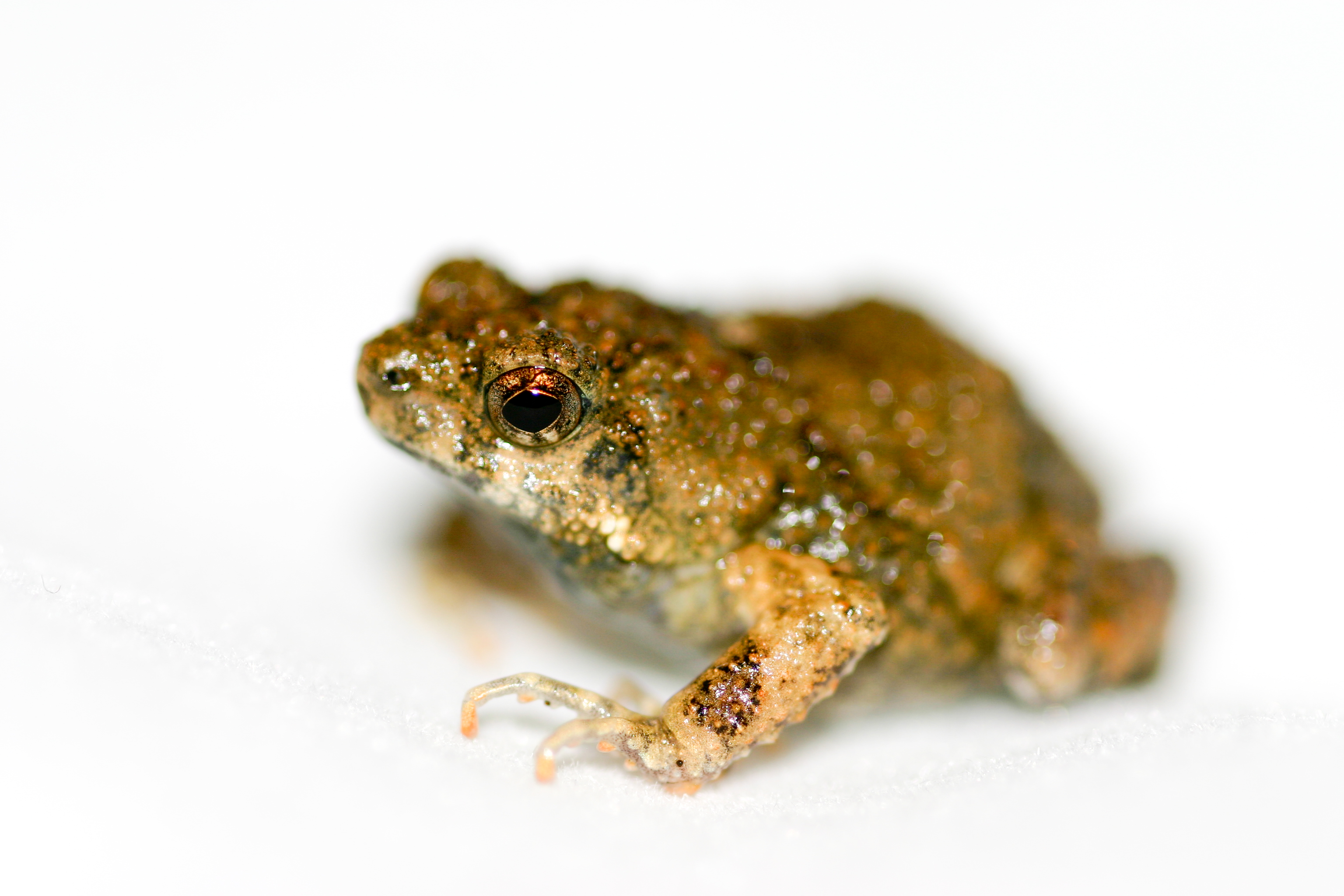
The túngara frog host

== Host and transmission ==
The primary host is the túngara frog (Engystomops pustulosus), which inhabits southern Mexico, northern South America and Trinidad and Tobago. Transmission occurs during the mating season when the males come together in groups during the rainy season at pools of water where they all produce a mating call. Female Corethrella midges, the putative vectors, use this as a cue to locate the male túngura frogs. A calling male túngura attracts on average 142 midges (up to 511 midges) every 30 minutes. The midges are thought to then transmit T. tungarae to the male. Seven different Corethrella midges have been observed biting the male túngara frogs, and which serves as the vector is not known. The location of the parasite in the midge is also unknown.

Although the female túngura frog does not produce mating calls, one female in a sample of 15 was found to be infected, suggesting that when the túngura frogs are in the mating clasp, midges trying to feed on the calling male occasionally also bite the female. Infection of males is significantly more common (10 of 25).
