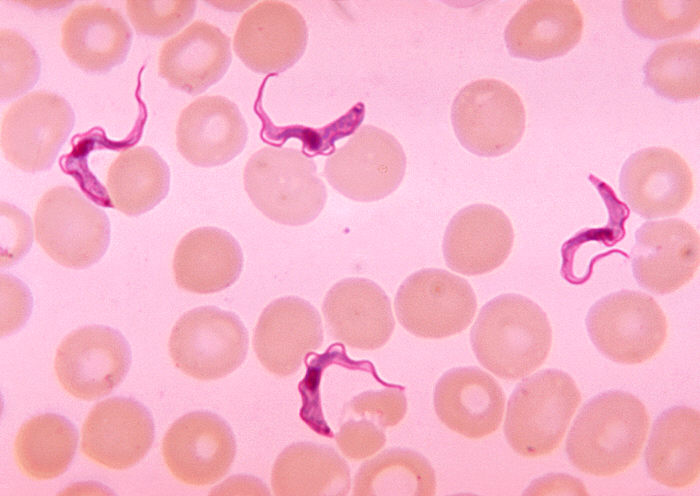
- Trypanosoma sp. among red blood cells.

Scientific classification
- Domain: Eukaryota
- Phylum: Euglenozoa
- Class: Kinetoplastea
- Order: Trypanosomatida
- Family: Trypanosomatidae
- Subfamily: Trypanosomatinae
- Genus: Trypanosoma; Gruby, 1843

Subgenera
- Aneza Özdikmen 2009; Duttonella (Chalmers 1918) Hoare 1964; Herpetosoma Doflein 1901; Megatrypanum Hoare 1964; Nannomonas Hoare 1964; Pycnomonas Hoare 1964; Schizotrypanum (Chagas 1909); Trypanozoon (Lühe 1906) Hoare 1964

Synonyms
- Castellanella Chalmers 1918 non Pacheco & Rodrigues 1930; Duttonella Chalmers 1918; Haematomonas Mitrophanow 1883; Schizotrypanum Chagas 1909; Trypanozoon Lühe 1906

= Trypanosoma =

Genus of parasitic flagellate protist in the Kinetoplastea class

Trypanosoma is a genus of kinetoplastids (class Trypanosomatidae), a group of unicellular parasitic flagellate protozoa under the phylum Euglenozoa. The name is derived from the Ancient Greek trypano- (borer) and soma (body) because of their corkscrew-like motion. Most trypanosomes are heteroxenous (requiring more than one obligatory host to complete life cycle) and most are transmitted via a vector. The majority of species are transmitted by blood-feeding invertebrates, but there are different mechanisms among the varying species. Trypanosoma equiperdum is spread between horses and other equine species by sexual contact. They are generally found in the intestine of their invertebrate host, but normally occupy the bloodstream or an intracellular environment in the vertebrate host.

Trypanosomes infect a variety of hosts and cause various diseases, including the fatal human diseases sleeping sickness, caused by Trypanosoma brucei, and Chagas disease, caused by Trypanosoma cruzi.

The mitochondrial genome of the Trypanosoma, as well as of other kinetoplastids, known as the kinetoplast, is made up of a highly complex series of catenated circles and minicircles and requires a cohort of proteins for organisation during cell division.

== History ==
In 1841, Gabriel Valentin found flagellates that today are included in Trypanoplasma in the blood of trout.

The genus (T. sanguinis) was named by Gruby in 1843, after parasites in the blood of frogs.

In 1903, David Bruce identified the protozoan parasite and the tsetse fly vector of African trypanosomiasis.

== Taxonomy ==
Many past phylogenetic analyses using the 18S (small subunit) ribosomal RNA (SSU rRNA) sequence have indicated a non-monophyletic Trypanosoma (as "traditionally defined") with the biflagellate Bodonida nested within. These methods suggest an ancient split between a branch containing all Salivarian trypanosomes and a branch containing all non-Salivarian lineages. The latter branch in turn splits into a clade containing bird, reptilian and the Stercorarian trypanosomes infecting mammals, and a clade with a branch of fish trypanosomes and a branch of reptilian or amphibian lineages.

However, analyses using both the combination of the glyceraldehyde phosphate dehydrogenase gene with SSU rRNA, of whole genomes, and of the kinetoplast (mitochondrial) genome indicate that Trypanosoma (again, as "traditionally defined") is, indeed, monophyletic. This is in spite of the distinctness of the clades formed by T. cruzi (cause of Chagas' disease) and T. brucei (cause of African sleeping sickness). The division into the Salivaria and the Stercoria remains valid as each can be assigned to a clade in these analyses.

- Group Salivaria: African trypanosomes, passed to the vertebrate recipient in the saliva of the tsetse fly (Glossina spp.). Antigenic variation is a characteristic shared by the Salivaria, which has been particularly well-studied in T. brucei.
  - Subgenus Trypanozoon includes T. brucei, T. rhodesiense, etc.
  - Subgenus Duttonella includes T. vivax.
  - Subgenus Nannomonas contains T. congolense.
- Group Stercoraria: Central/South American trypanosomes, passed to the vertebrate recipient in the feces of insects from the subfamily Triatominae (most importantly Triatoma infestans). Some subgenera are:
  - Subgenus Schizotrypanum, which contains T. cruzi and a number of bat trypanosomes. The bat species include T. cruzi marinkellei (a subspecies of T. cruzi), T. dionisii, T. erneyi, T. livingstonei and T. wauwau. There are a few species yet unnamed.
  - Subgenus Herpetosoma, which contains T. lewisi and T. rangeli (inclusion of both species would make the subgenus paraphyletic)

=== Evolution ===
The overall evolution of the group follows the general structure of the groups and subgenera. Of interest is how the trypanosomes became parasistic in the first place, how it became dixenous (parasitizes two hosts), and how it came to affect vertebrates, mammals, and then humans in particular. The emergence of parasitism is dated back to the origin of the order Trypanosomatida, which includes both the trypanosomes and the Leishmania; Bodo saltans is a reasonably close relative to the common ancestor of this group. The emergence of a dixenous lifestyle from a monoxenous ancestor has happened at least three times, in Phytomonas, in vertebrate-infecting Trypanosoma, and in vertebrate-infecting Leishmania/Porcisia/Endotrypanum.

The Salivaria split from the rest of the trypanosomes about 150 million years ago (Mya). They were probably mainly living in the guts of insects, until the appearance of tsetse flies gave them access to mammalian blood. On the other hand, the common ancestor of the T. cruzi clade (~Schizotrypanum) appeared about 84 million years ago, not long before the diversification of bats, which is thought to have contributed to the diversification of the group and ultimately a trypanosome that infects many different types of mammals.

== Selected species ==
Species of Trypanosoma include the following:

- T. ambystomae. in amphibians
- T. antiquus, extinct (Fossil in Miocene amber)
- T. avium, which infects birds and blackflies
- T. bennetti, which infects birds and biting midges
- T. boissoni, in elasmobranch
- T. brucei, which has subsumed some former species to give rise to the following subspecies:
  - T. brucei brucei (the original T. brucei), which causes nagana in cattle.
  - T. brucei equiperdum, which causes dourine or covering sickness in horses and other Equidae, it can be spread through coitus. Arose separately from T. b. evansi in Eastern Africa.
  - T. brucei evansi, which causes one form of the disease surra in certain animals including camels (a single case report of human infection in 2005 in India was successfully treated with suramin.). Enmerged at two independent occasions in Western Africa.
  - T. brucei gambiense and T. brucei rhodesiense, both of which cause sleeping sickness in humans.
- T. cruzi, which causes Chagas disease in humans
- Trypanosoma culicavium, which infects birds and mosquitoes
- T. congolense, which causes nagana in ruminant livestock, horses and a wide range of wildlife
- T. equinum, in South American horses, transmitted via Tabanidae,
- T. everetti, in birds
- T. hosei, in amphibians
- T. irwini, in koalas
- T. lewisi, in rats
- T. melophagium, in sheep, transmitted via Melophagus ovinus
- T. parroti, in amphibians
- T. percae, in the species Perca fluviatilis
- T. phedinae
- T. rangeli, believed to be nonpathogenic to humans
- T. rotatorium, in amphibians
- T. rugosae, in amphibians
- T. sergenti, in amphibians
- T. simiae, which causes nagana in pigs. Its main reservoirs are warthogs and bush pigs
- T. sinipercae, in fishes
- T. suis, which causes a different form of surra
- T. theileri, a large trypanosome infecting ruminants and transmitted by a variety of vectors including tabanids and mosquitoes
- T. thomasbancrofti, an avian trypanosome with culicine mosquito vector
- T. triglae, in marine teleosts
- T. tungarae, in frogs
- T. vivax, which causes the disease nagana, mainly in West Africa, although it has spread to South America

== Hosts, life cycle and morphologies ==
The six main morphologies of trypanosomatids.

Two different types of trypanosomes exist, and their life cycles are different, the salivarian species and the stercorarian species.

Stercorarian trypanosomes infect insects, most often the triatomid kissing bug, by developing in the posterior gut followed by release into the feces and subsequent depositing on the skin of the vertebrate host. The organism then penetrates and can disseminate throughout the body. Insects become infected when taking a blood meal.

Salivarian trypanosomes develop in the anterior gut of insects, most importantly the Tsetse fly, and infective organisms are inoculated into the host by the insect bite before it feeds.

As trypanosomes progress through their life cycle they undergo a series of morphological changes as is typical of trypanosomatids. The life cycle often consists of the trypomastigote form in the vertebrate host and the trypomastigote or promastigote form in the gut of the invertebrate host. Intracellular lifecycle stages are normally found in the amastigote form. The trypomastigote morphology is unique to species in the genus Trypanosoma.

== Meiosis ==
Evidence has been obtained for meiosis in T. cruzi, and for genetic exchange. T. brucei is able to undergo meiosis within the salivary glands of its tsetse fly host, and meiosis is considered to be an intrinsic part of the T. brucei developmental cycle. An adaptive benefit of meiosis for T. crucei and T. brucei may be the recombinational repair of DNA damages that are acquired in the hostile environment of their respective hosts.
