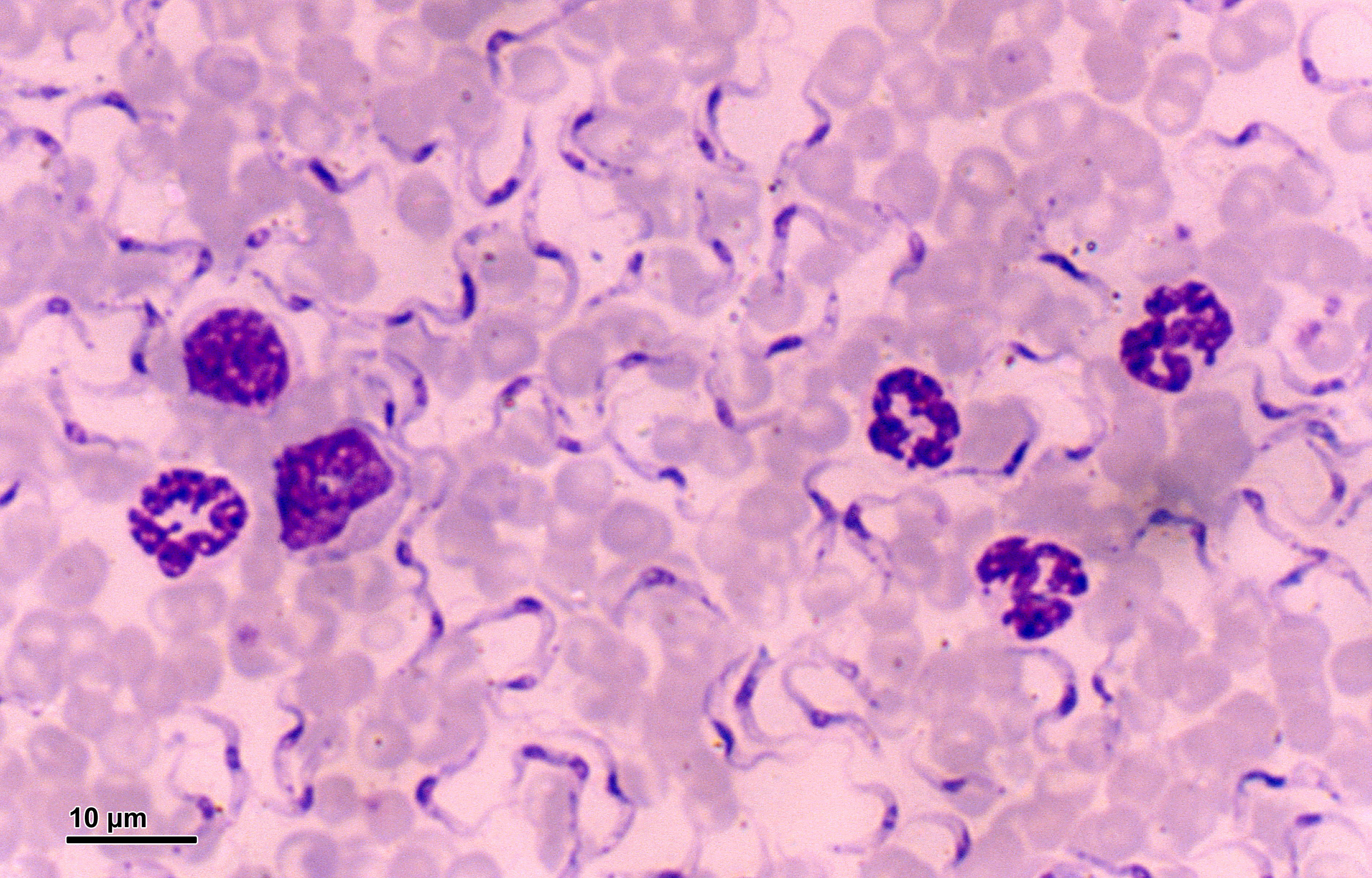

Scientific classification
- Domain: Eukaryota
- Clade: Discoba
- Phylum: Euglenozoa
- Class: Kinetoplastea
- Order: Trypanosomatida
- Family: Trypanosomatidae
- Genus: Trypanosoma
- Species: T. brucei
- Subspecies: T. b. equiperdum

Trinomial name
- Trypanosoma brucei equiperdum Døflein 1901

Synonyms
- Trypanosoma equiperdum Døflein 1901

= Trypanosoma brucei equiperdum =

Subspecies of kinetoplastid

Τrypanosoma brucei equiperdum is a subspecies of T. brucei parasites that causes covering sickness in horses and other animals in the family Equidae. T. b. equiperdum is the only known trypanosome that is not spread by an insect vector. There has been substantial controversy surrounding whether T. b. equiperdum should be considered a unique species, or a strain of T. evansi or T. brucei. T. b. equiperdum is unique in that its kinetoplast, the network of connected rings that make up its mitochondrial DNA, consists of thousands of "minicircles" that are identical in sequence.
