= Surra =

Parasitic disease of animals

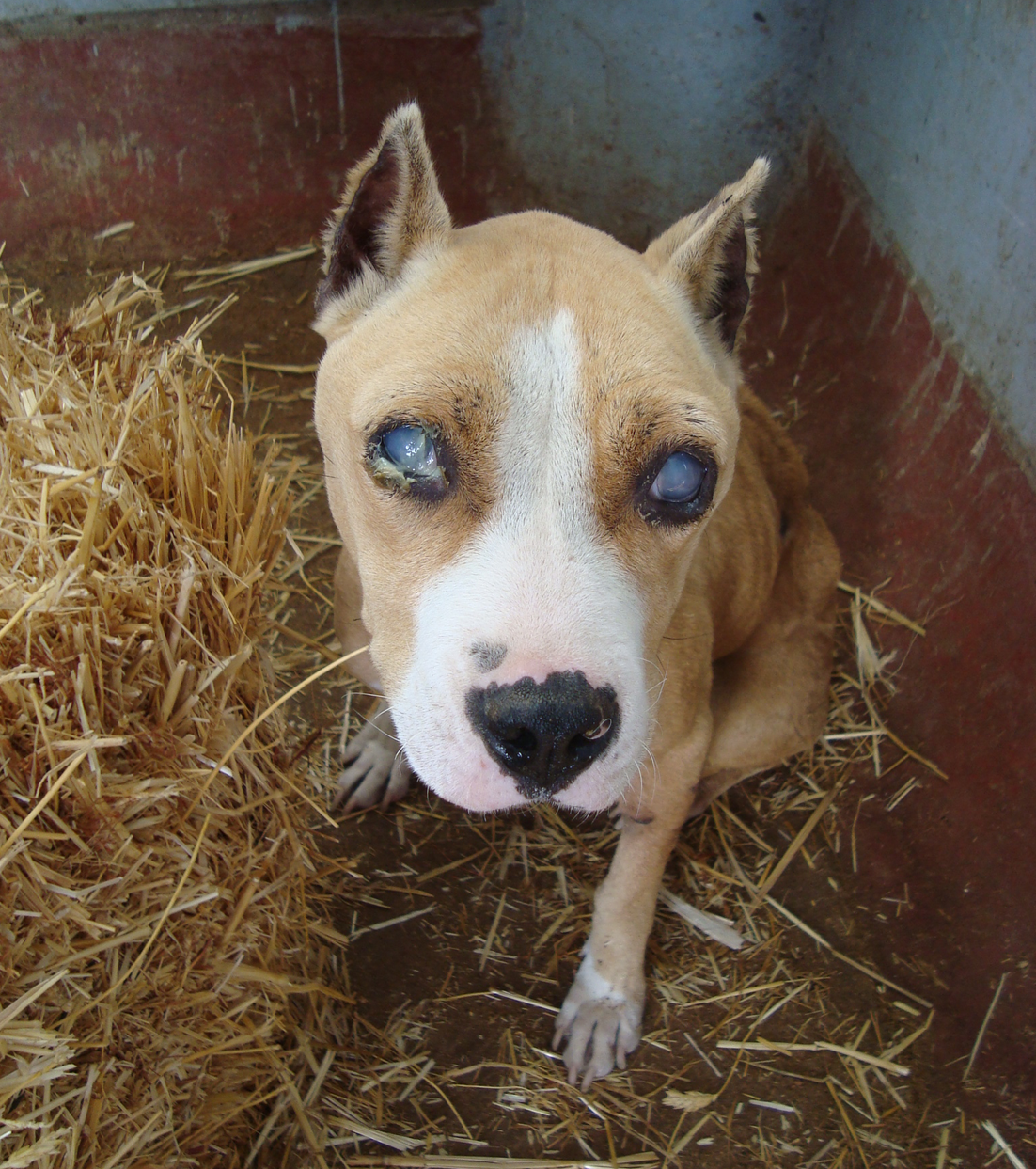
Surra (Trypanosoma evansi infection) in a Tunisian dog

Surra (from the Marathi sūra, meaning the sound of heavy breathing through nostrils, of imitative origin) is a disease of vertebrate animals. The disease is caused by protozoan trypanosomes, specifically Trypanosoma evansi, of several species which infect the blood of the vertebrate host, causing fever, weakness, and lethargy which lead to weight loss and anemia. In some animals the disease is fatal unless treated.

== Overview ==
An acute form of the disease, which is generally fatal unless treated, occurs in horses, donkeys, mules, cattle, buffalo, deer, camels, llamas, dogs, and cats. This form is caused by Trypanosoma evansi (Steel 1885) (Balbiani 1888), and is transmitted by horse-flies, and also by the vampire bat, Desmodus rotundus, in South-America. This form occurs in South America, Northern Africa, and the Middle East. This was the first form of pathogenic trypanosome discovered and was first described by Griffith Evans in 1880 while he was working in India.

A chronic form of the disease, which is milder but persistent, occurs in pigs, sheep, and goats. This form is caused by Trypanosoma suis and is transmitted by tsetse. This form occurs in Africa.

Surra is also known from other countries; an unspecified form is locally common in Mindanao, in the Philippines.

== Morphology ==
Trypanosoma evansi, although monomorphic in most cases, can be pleomorphic in some strains. They are characterized by a long free flagellum with a narrow drawn out posterior. Kinetoplast and dyskinetoplastic forms appear. Kinetoplast is either terminal or subterminal.

== Transmission ==
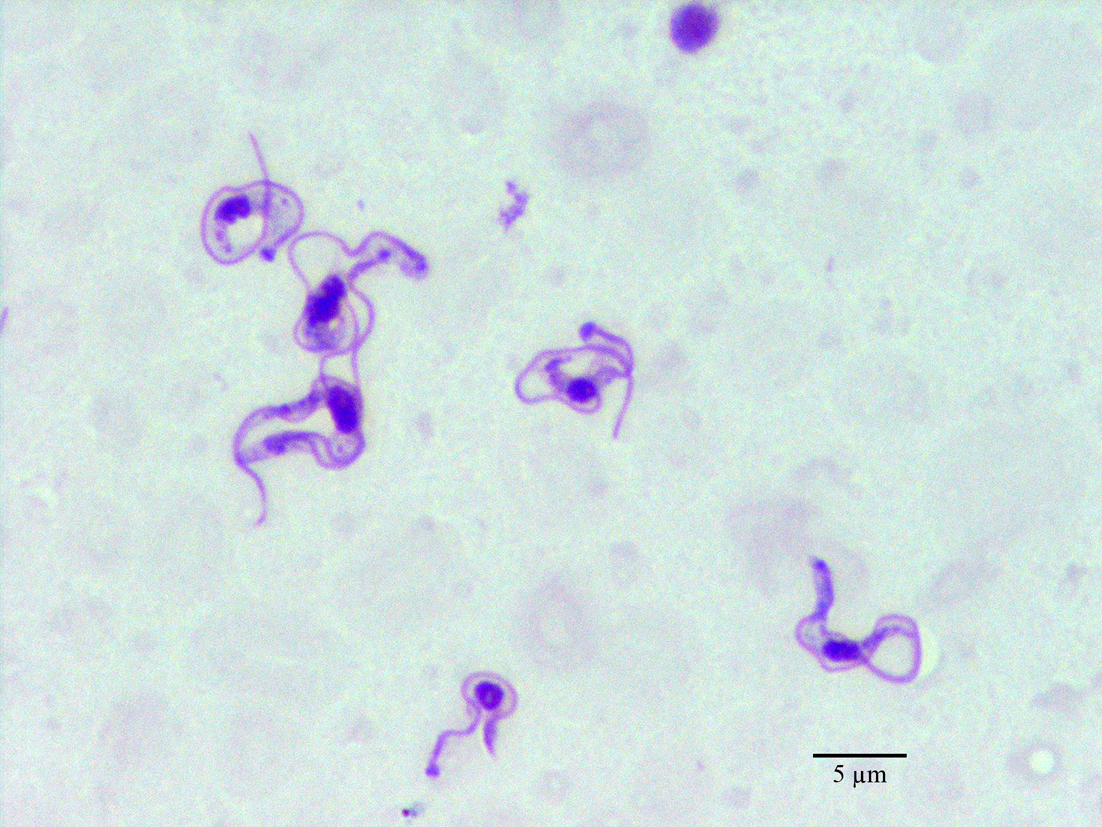
Trypanosoma evansi in the blood of an infected dog

Transferred by species of Tabanus flies, Trypanosoma evansi development does not take place in the actual vector. In order for the transmission to be successful, trypanosomes need to survive in the gut of the flies and be regurgitated during subsequent feeding. Since Tabanidae are most abundant during rainy and post rainy seasons, that is when most outbreaks of surra occur.

In order for the transfer of the disease from the flies to the animals, interruption of feeding habits needs to occur. This direct transmission technique involves them cutting the skin with their mouths, then lapping up the blood along with connective tissue fluid. This means a good indicator of disease would be looking at trypanosome density in capillary blood and connective tissue. After transferring the infectious organisms to the host species, the flies leave to rest and during that time transmission was successful only in some cases. Because the trypanosomes remain in the food canal of the flies for 4–8 hours depending on the species, the flies can feed off of one animal's blood more than one time, thus increasing the chance of successful transmission.

Although the most common method of transferring trypanosomes to other species is through Tabanus flies, there are other insects that can also transmit this disease to livestock. These blood sucking insects are Stomoxys, Haematobia (also known as Lyperosia), and Haematopota.

Other methods of transmission still being studied are the passing of T. evansi thorough iatrogenic transmission. Evidence has been seen of transmission through eating infected meat and also through vampire bats in geographical areas where they are found.

=== Vectors ===
Disease	Species affected	Trypanosoma agents	Distribution	Glossina vectors
Surra — chronic form	domestic pigs warthog (Phacochoerus aethiopicus) forest hogs (Hylochoerus spp.)	T. suis	Africa	G. palpalis G. fuscipes G. morsitans G. tachinoides G. longipalpis G. fusca G. tabaniformis G. brevipalpis G. vanhoofi G. austeni

== Pathogenesis ==
The degree of pathogenicity depends on what species the host is, the virulence of the Trypanosoma evansi strain, and the dose received by the host. Many species such as dogs, horses and rats, have been shown to have immunological reactions to the infection, such as anemia due to decrease in erythrocytes and hemoglobin. Although not fully understood at this point in time, some theories believe that the erythrocytes could acquire trypaonosomal antigen, resulting in a negative immunological reaction.

Animals that have been infected show loss of appetite, weight loss, anaemia, oedema, fever, salivations, lacrimation, and abortion. The proteases that are released during infection of T.evansi might degrade the host tissue proteins and are a huge force in the pathogenesis. That is why scientists are looking at immune targeting of these proteases to protect the infected host.

== Diagnosis ==
Some conventional parasitological techniques (CPT), such as wet blood film, and stained blood smears are used because so far, the best identifier is looking at the blood of the potentially infected host. Other tissues can be looked at, but the gold standard is identifying trypanosomes in the blood. Before the infection becomes severe, it is difficult to catch as many times these cryptic infections are undetectable by direct microscopy. Since CPT is not very sensitive, it cannot be used as a sole method of diagnosis.

The haematocrit centrifugation technique (HCT) is a much better alternative. Using HCT, trypanosomes can be detected in the blood even in field conditions. Buffy coat can be used to increase detection. Detection with this method is approx 85 trypanosomes per millilitre.

Rather than using live animals as test subjects, Canada used serological tests such as complement fixation tests to detect trypanosomes, and have been very successful. Other tests used look at detecting antibodies generated by the host species against T. evansi antigens. This is done using the enzyme-linked immunosorbent assays (ELISA) method. Now polymerase chain reaction (PCR) and DNA probes are being used to detect surra in animals.

== Treatment ==
The main methods of controlling surra has been drug chemotherapy, and chemoprophylaxis in animals.

== History ==
In South America, surra was known by the names mal de caderas (hip illness), murrina, peste boba, derrengadera, and Panama horse disease. Mal de caderas was sometimes used for rabies as well, but most commonly refers to surra. Mal de caderas spread from Brazil to eastern Bolivia in the 1840s. Because so many horses sickened and died from surra, people in eastern Bolivia from this point on were occasionally known to ride oxen, which became known as bueyes caballos (horse oxen) or bueyes de cabalgadura (riding oxen).
