= Trypanosoma suis =

Scientific classification
- Domain: Eukaryota
- Clade: Discoba
- Phylum: Euglenozoa
- Class: Kinetoplastea
- Order: Trypanosomatida
- Family: Trypanosomatidae
- Genus: Trypanosoma
- Subgenus: Pycnomonas
- Species: T. suis

Binomial name
- Trypanosoma suis Ochmann, 1905

Species of Kinetoplaste

Trypanosoma suis is a species of excavate trypanosome in the genus Trypanosoma that causes one form of the surra disease in animals. It infects pigs. It does not infect humans.

== Discovery ==
Trypanosoma suis was first encountered and described by Ochmann in 1905. He found the parasite in a herd of sick pigs in Dar-es-Salaam, Tanzania. Hence the name as the word suis means pig. Eventually it was lost in consecutive renaming of the parasite until the 1950s.

== Rediscovered ==
Trypanosoma suis is rarely seen and has been lost and rediscovered several times. In the 1950s T. suis is rediscovered in Burundi by two Belgian researchers.

T. suis remains the most rare member of the Salivarian trypanosomes. The only isolated specimen known of this species is kept at the Kenya Trypanosomiasis Research Institute, Nairobi.

The next detection was only made by Hutchinson and Gibson 2015. Newly developed molecular biology methods allowed the discovery of an uncertain Trypanosoma in samples from a few years prior from Tanzania and the Central African Republic. This molecular profile was then applied to blood smear slides from 1952 and 1953, a match was found, and the rediscovery of T. suis was declared.

== Transmission ==
The parasite is known to be transmitted by the tsetse fly Glossina brevipalpis.
