= Covering sickness =

Disease of horses and other Equidae

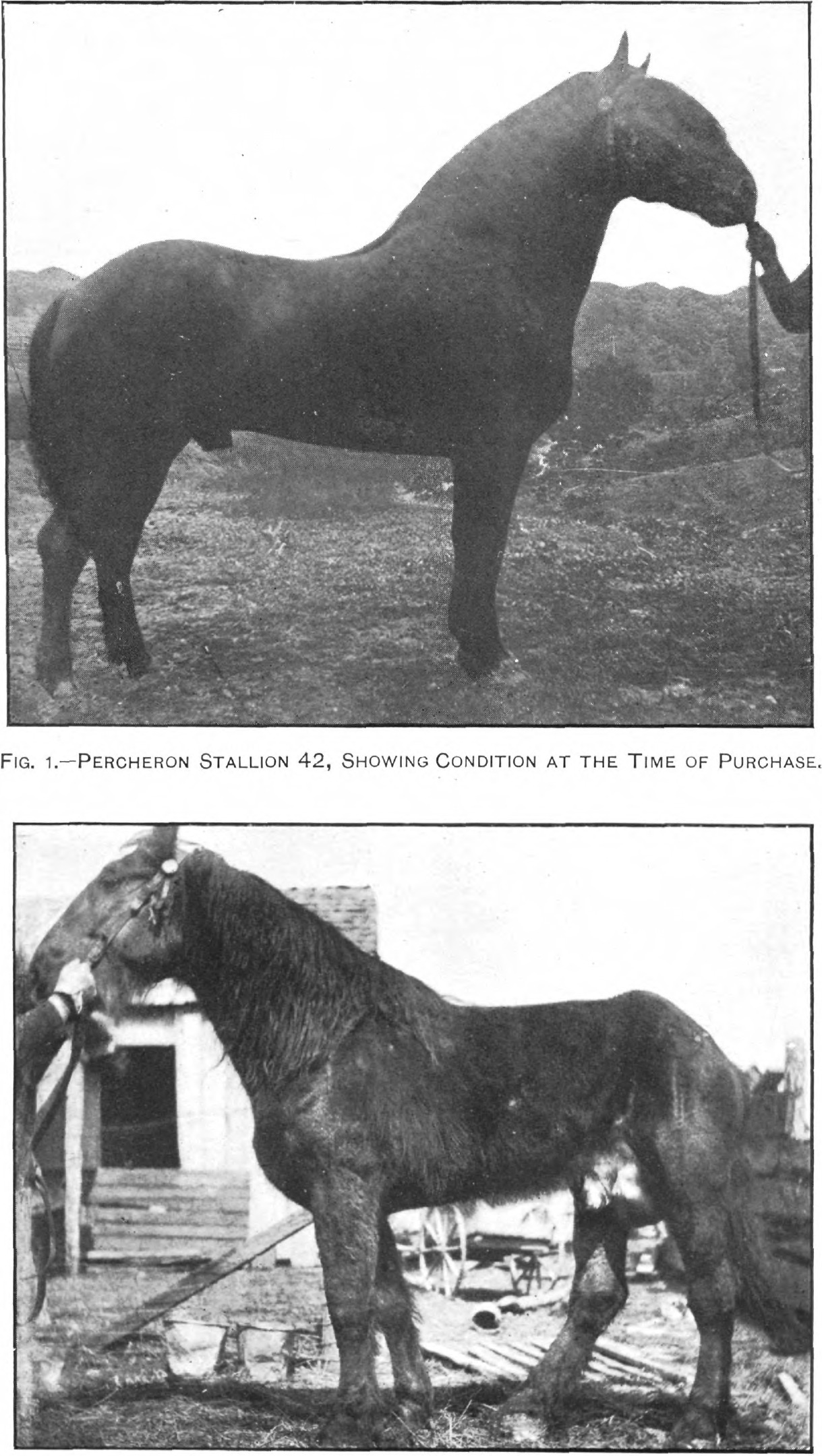
Mohler, John R., Dourine of horses – its cause and suppression (1911)

Covering sickness, or dourine (French, from the Arabic darina, meaning mangy (said of a female camel), feminine of darin, meaning dirty), is a disease of horses and other members of the family Equidae. The disease is caused by Trypanosoma equiperdum, which belongs to an important genus of parasitic protozoa. The occurrence of dourine is notifiable in the European Union under legislation from the OIE. There currently is no vaccine and although clinical signs can be treated, there is no cure.

== Parasite ==
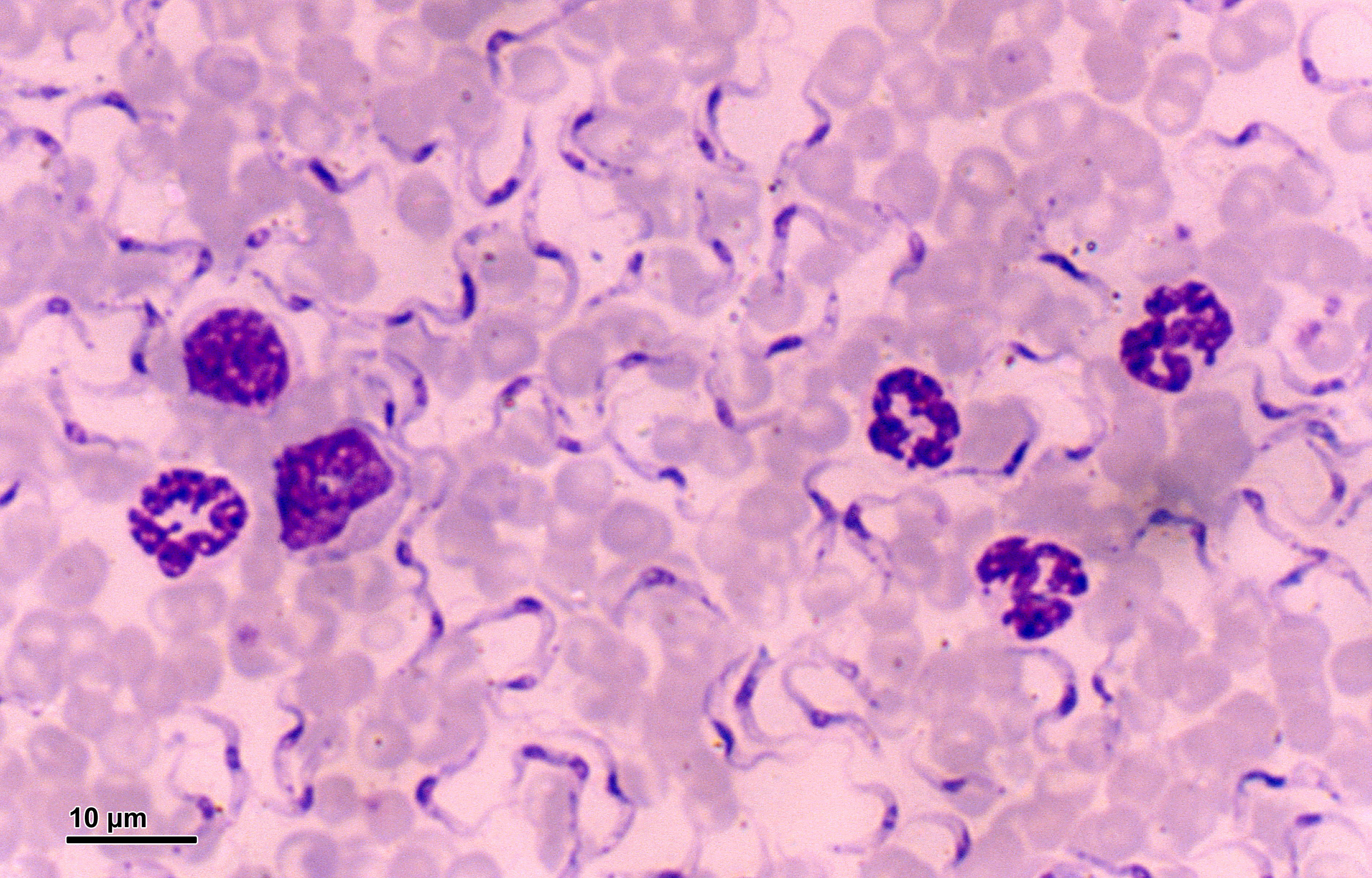
Trypanosoma equiperdum

Out of the Trypanosoma genus, Trypanosoma equiperdum has been discovered to be most closely linked to Trypanosoma evansi, so much so that even observation under microscope is not sufficient to differentiate between the two as their structure is very similar.

Dourine has no known vectors or fomites existing in the natural world, being known only as a sexually transmitted disease of members of the equine family, including donkeys, mules, and horses. In a laboratory setting, Trypanosoma equiperdum has been manipulated to adapt to and proliferate in other species, such as dogs, rabbits, mice and rats, but this has never been observed to occur naturally. Although this limits spread of the disease because it is restricted to the equine population alone, the organism has developed complex mechanisms over time to better equip itself for prolonged survival in the equine species. As normal for its genus, the parasite efficiently evades the host animal's immune system through the use of variable surface glycoproteins or VSGs. These VSGs allow the organism to constantly manipulate and change the surface structure of its proteins, which means it is constantly being presented to the immune system as a new foreign organism and this prevents the body from mounting a large enough immune response to eradicate the disease.

== Transmission and symptoms ==
Dourine is spread venereally, and causes disc-shaped lesions of the reproductive organs, nervous system and skin, acute inflammation and edema of the genitals, followed by hindlimb paralysis, paraplegia and death in more than fifty percent of cases.

== Treatment ==
Because this disease is highly durable in its equine host, it has proved very difficult to develop a vaccine for it. There are four main drugs on the market that are used to treat the clinical signs of dourine: Suramin, Diminazen, Cymerlarsan, and Quinapyramin. However, none of the listed drugs is a cure and even the individual animals that are treated will experience relapses. Although this disease is not fatal in all cases and spontaneous recovery can occur, the death rate is relatively high and listed at a mortality rate of over fifty percent.

This lack of a cure or vaccine is a definite problem in the equine industry, especially in developing countries where equines are highly valuable for both agriculture and transportation. Dourine is considered an endemic problem in developing countries, where over sixty percent of equines in the world are located. The protocol for this disease, as stated by OIE, currently stands at slaughter of seropositive animals. This is not an economically feasible option for many people who depend on horses for their livelihood. Therefore, it is crucial to continue research in this field and develop a viable vaccine.
