= Trypanosoma simiae =

Scientific classification
- Domain: Eukaryota
- Supergroup: Discoba
- Phylum: Euglenozoa
- Class: Kinetoplastea
- Order: Trypanosomatida
- Family: Trypanosomatidae
- Genus: Trypanosoma
- Subgenus: Nannomonas
- Species: T. simiae

Binomial name
- Trypanosoma simiae Bruce et al. 1912

Trypansoma simiae is a protozoan parasite belonging to the genus Trypansoma and the family Trypansomatidae. It is usually found in domesticated animals; i.e pigs, and frequently found in Sub-Saharan Africa. It is also sometimes found in camels and rhinos. It was once described as "the lightning destroyer of the domestic pig" as it caused a swift death in them after infection.This parasite is transmitted through the ingestion of flies. Trypansoma encompasses various different species including T. simaie. It is of particular interest as it is zoonotic and has a high impact on livestock and different farm animals.

== Description ==
=== Morphology and structure ===
They are large, monomorphic, and uniform in shape. It is usually free of granules in its cytoplasm. It also has an elongated undulating body which aids in its motility. The undulating body along with the flagellum allows it to travel along through the bloodstream of its hosts.

==== Histology ====
Usually presented in the bloodstream, red blood cells and the host's circulating plasma.

== Life cycle ==
The life cycle of this parasite is through sexual reproduction. The complete cycle usually takes about 20 days. It involves both the vertebrate host and the insect vector (usually the fly), once the fly is ingested through the host, it then goes through the bloodstream and causes the host to have various symptoms.

== Hosts ==
T. simaie isolates in a specific host. The hosts are all domesticated and zoonotic animals usually pigs, predominately in people. Can also infect rhinos and camels. The infect the host via ingestion of a fly

== Impact ==
Trypansoma simaie is a very fatal parasite that infects domesticated animals. It causes inflammation and fever.
