= Glossina severini =

Scientific classification
- Domain: Eukaryota
- Kingdom: Animalia
- Phylum: Arthropoda
- Class: Insecta
- Order: Diptera
- Family: Glossinidae
- Genus: Glossina
- Species: G. severini

Binomial name
- Glossina severini Newstead, 1913

Species of tsetse fly

Glossina severini is one of the 23 recognized species of tsetse flies (genus Glossina), and it belongs to the forest/fusca group (subgenus Austenina).

== Distribution ==
Glossina severini was historically reported from small areas around the mountains of the eastern Democratic Republic of Congo, near the borders with Uganda and Rwanda. However, a review of the scientific literature from 1990 – 2020 found that no entomological survey was carried out in those areas, and so there is no recent published information on the geographic distribution of the species.
