= Glossina schwetzi =

Scientific classification
- Domain: Eukaryota
- Kingdom: Animalia
- Phylum: Arthropoda
- Class: Insecta
- Order: Diptera
- Family: Glossinidae
- Genus: Glossina
- Species: G. schwetzi

Binomial name
- Glossina schwetzi Newstead and Evans, 1921

Species of tsetse fly

Glossina schwetzi is one of the 23 recognized species of tsetse flies (genus Glossina), and it belongs to the forest/fusca group (subgenus Austenina).

== Distribution ==
Glossina schwetzi was historically reported along the coast of the Atlantic Ocean, including countries such as Angola, the Congo, the Democratic Republic of the Congo and Gabon, and possibly Cameroon. However, a review of the scientific literature from 1990 – 2020 found no record of G. schwetzi, although it should be considered that the trapping effort in its historical areas of occurrence was limited.
