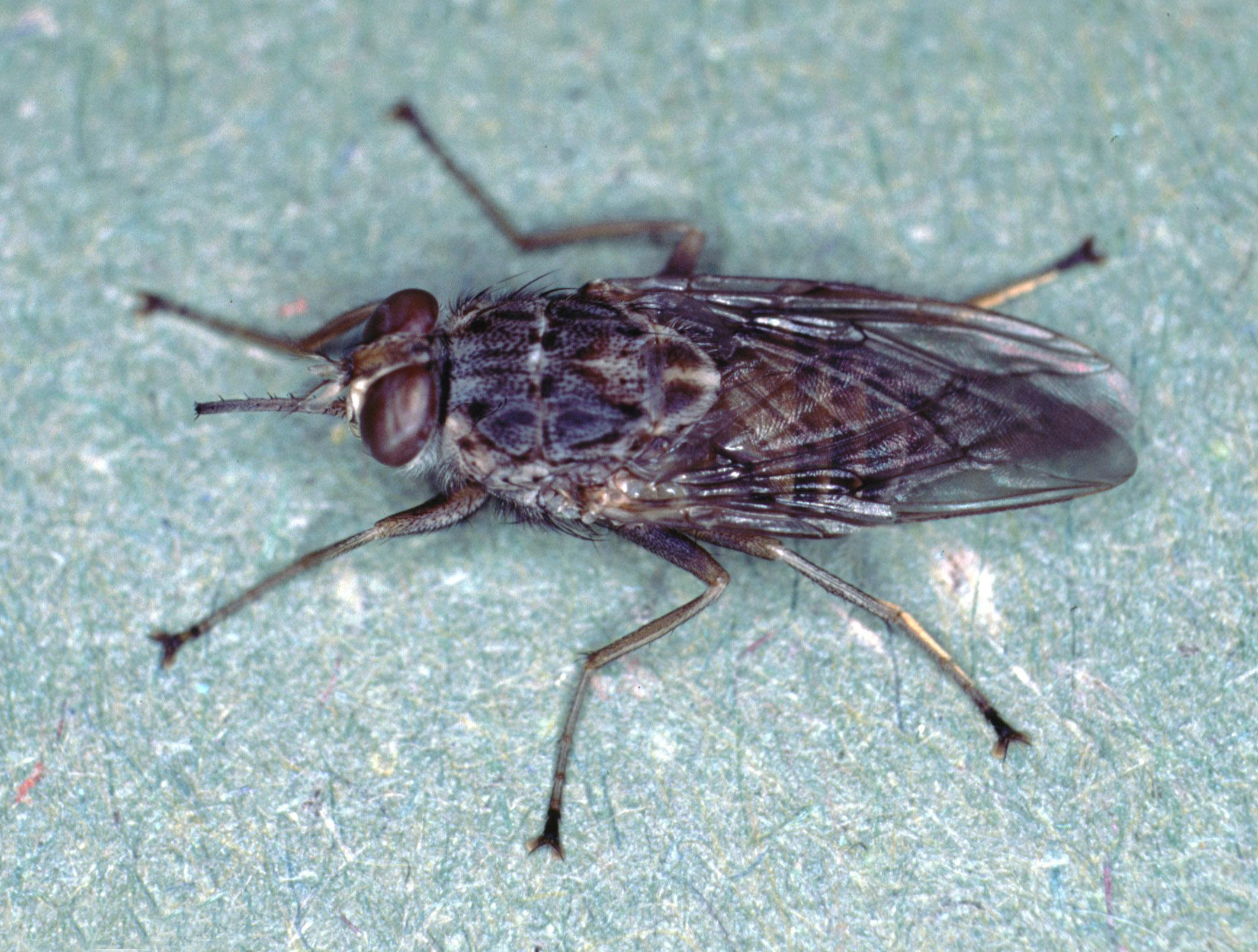
- Glossina morsitans

Scientific classification
- Kingdom: Animalia
- Phylum: Arthropoda
- Clade: Pancrustacea
- Class: Insecta
- Order: Diptera
- Clade: Eremoneura
- Clade: Cyclorrhapha
- Section: Schizophora
- Subsection: Calyptratae
- Superfamily: Hippoboscoidea
- Family: Glossinidae; Theobald, 1903
- Genus: Glossina; Wiedemann, 1830

Species groups
- Morsitans ("savannah" subgenus); Fusca ("forest" subgenus); Palpalis ("riverine" subgenus)
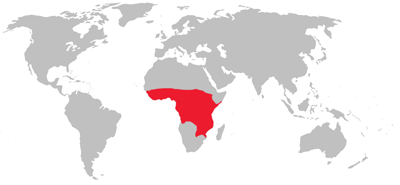
- Range of the tsetse fly

= Tsetse fly =

Tsetse fly Temporal range: Eocene - Recent 34–0 Ma

Genus of disease-spreading insects

Tsetse flies (UK: /ˈ(t)sɛtsi/ (T)SET-see or US: /ˈ(t)siːtsi/ (T)SEET-see; sometimes spelled tzetze; also known as tik-tik flies) are large biting flies that inhabit much of tropical Africa. Tsetse flies include all the species in the genus Glossina, which are placed in their own family, Glossinidae. The tsetse is an obligate parasite that lives by feeding on the blood of vertebrate animals. Tsetse flies have been extensively studied because of their role in transmitting disease. They have pronounced economic and public health consequences in sub-Saharan Africa as the biological vectors of trypanosomes, causing human and animal trypanosomiasis.

Tsetse flies can be distinguished from other large flies by two easily-observed features: primarily, tsetse flies fold their wings over their abdomens completely when they are resting (so that one wing rests directly on top of the other); Secondly, tsetse flies also have a long proboscis, extending directly forward, which is attached by a distinct bulb to the bottom of their heads.

Fossilized tsetse specimens have been recovered from Paleogene rocks in the United States and Germany. Twenty-three extant species of tsetse flies are known from the African continent and the Arabian Peninsula.

== Terminology ==
Tsetse without the "fly" has become more common in English, particularly in the scientific and development communities.

The word is pronounced [tsɛtsɛ] (tseh-tseh) in the Sotho languages and is easily rendered in other African languages. During World War II, a British de Havilland antisubmarine aircraft known as the Tsetse Mosquito helped establish the term in commonplace use among native English speakers.

== Biology ==
The biology of tsetse flies is relatively well understood by entomologists. They have been extensively studied because of their medical, veterinary, and economic importance, because the flies can be raised in a laboratory, and because they are relatively large, facilitating their analysis.

=== Morphology ===
Tsetse flies can be seen as independent individuals in three forms: as third-instar larvae, pupae, and adults.

Tsetse first become separate from their mothers during the third larval instar, during which they have the typical appearance of maggots. However, this life stage is short, lasting at most a few hours, and is almost never observed outside of the laboratory.

Tsetse next develop a hard external case, the puparium, and become pupae – small, hard-shelled oblongs with two distinctively small, dark lobes at the tail (breathing) end. Tsetse pupae are under 1 centimetre (1/2 in) long. Within the puparial shell, tsetse complete the pupal stage.

At the end of the pupal stage, tsetse emerges as adult flies. The adults are relatively large flies, with lengths of 0.5–1.5 centimetres (1/4–5/8 in), and have a recognizable shape, or bauplan, which makes them easy to distinguish from other flies. Tsetse have large heads, distinctly separated eyes, and unusual antennae. The thorax is quite large, while the abdomen is wider, rather than elongated, and shorter than the wings.

Four characteristics collectively separate adult tsetse from other kinds of flies:

Proboscis	Tsetse have a distinct proboscis, a long and thin structure attached to the bottom of the head, pointing forward.	A photograph of the head of a tsetse illustrating the forward pointing proboscis
Folded wings	When at rest, tsetse fold their wings completely, one-on-top of the other.	A photograph of the whole body of a tsetse illustrating the folded wings when at rest
Hatchet cell	The discal medial ("middle") cell of the wing has a characteristic hatchet shape, resembling a meat cleaver or a hatchet.	A photograph of the wing of a tsetse illustrating the hatchet shaped central cell
Branched arista hairs	The antennae have arista with hairs which are, themselves, branched.	A photograph and diagram of the head of a tsetse illustrating the branched hairs of the antenna's arista

=== Anatomy ===
Like all other insects, tsetse flies have an adult body comprising three visibly distinct parts: the head, the thorax, and the abdomen.

The head has large eyes, distinctly separated on each side, and a distinct, forward-pointing proboscis attached underneath by a large bulb. The thorax is large, made of three fused segments. Three pairs of legs are attached to the thorax, as are two wings and two halteres. The abdomen is short but wide and changes dramatically in volume during feeding.

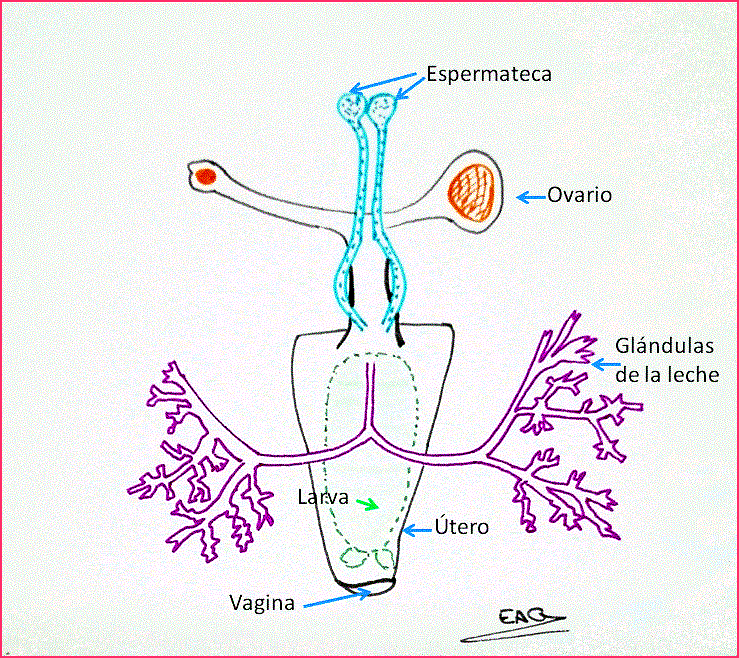
Reproductive anatomy sketch

The internal anatomy of the tsetse fly is fairly typical of the insects; the crop is large enough to accommodate a huge increase in size during feeding, as tsetse can take a blood meal equal in weight to themselves. The dipteran crop is heavily understudied, with Glossina being one of the few genera having relatively reliable information available: Moloo and Kutuza 1970 for G. brevipalpis (including its innervation) and Langley 1965 for G. morsitans. The reproductive tract of adult females includes a uterus, which can become large enough to hold the third-instar larva at the end of each pregnancy.

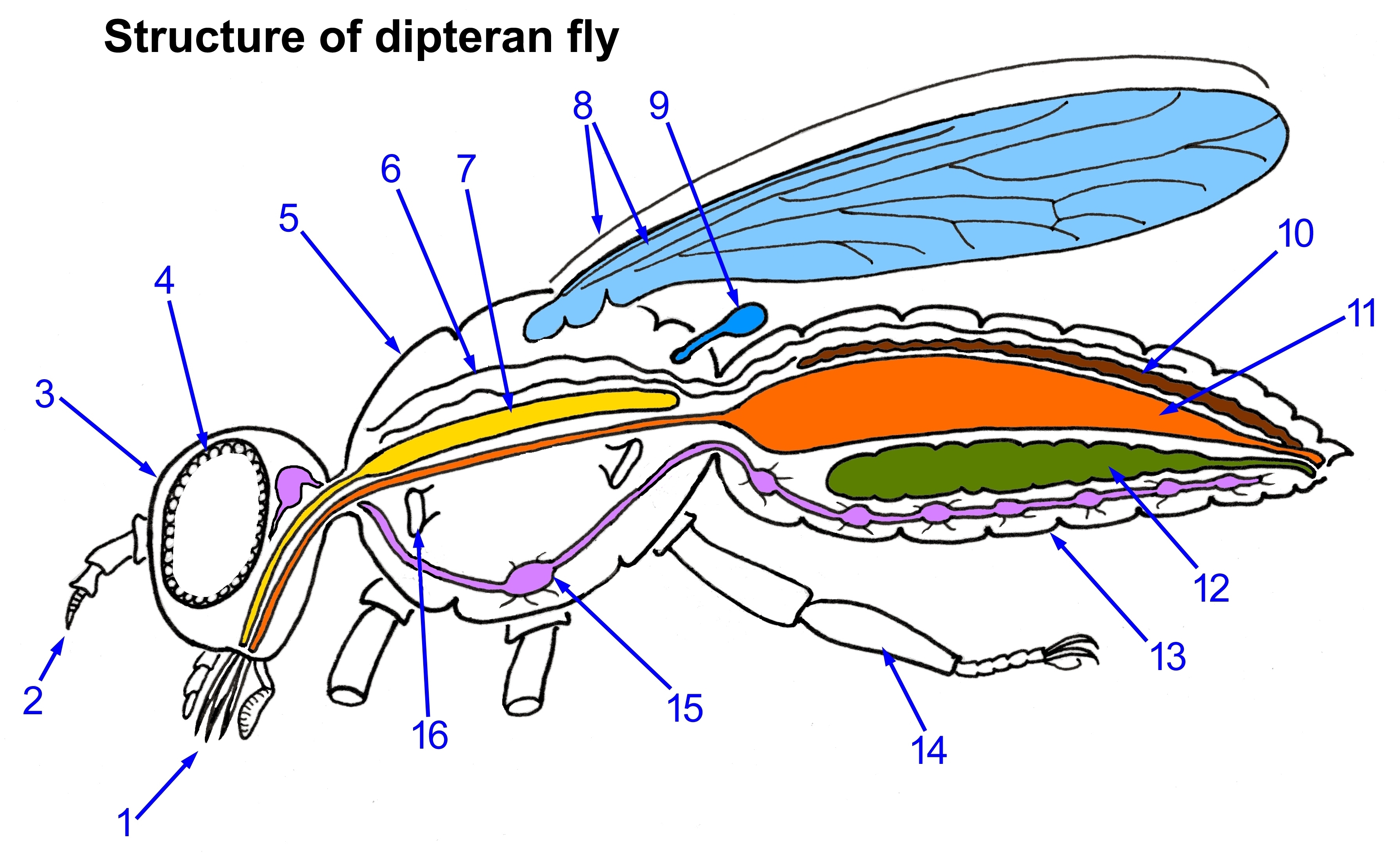
1-Complex mouthparts, 2-Paired antennae, 3-Head, 4-Compound eye, 5-Thorax, 6-Open tube heart, 7-Salivary gland, 8-One pair of wings, 9-Halter, 10-Excretory (Malpighian) tube, 11-Gut, 12-Ovary (or testis), 13-Abdomen, 14-Legs (3 pairs), 15-Thoracic ganglion of nervous system, 16-Spiracle opening to respiratory tube (trachea)

Most tsetse flies are, physically, very tough. Houseflies, and even horseflies, are easily killed with a flyswatter, for example; a great deal of effort is needed to crush a tsetse fly.

=== Life cycle ===
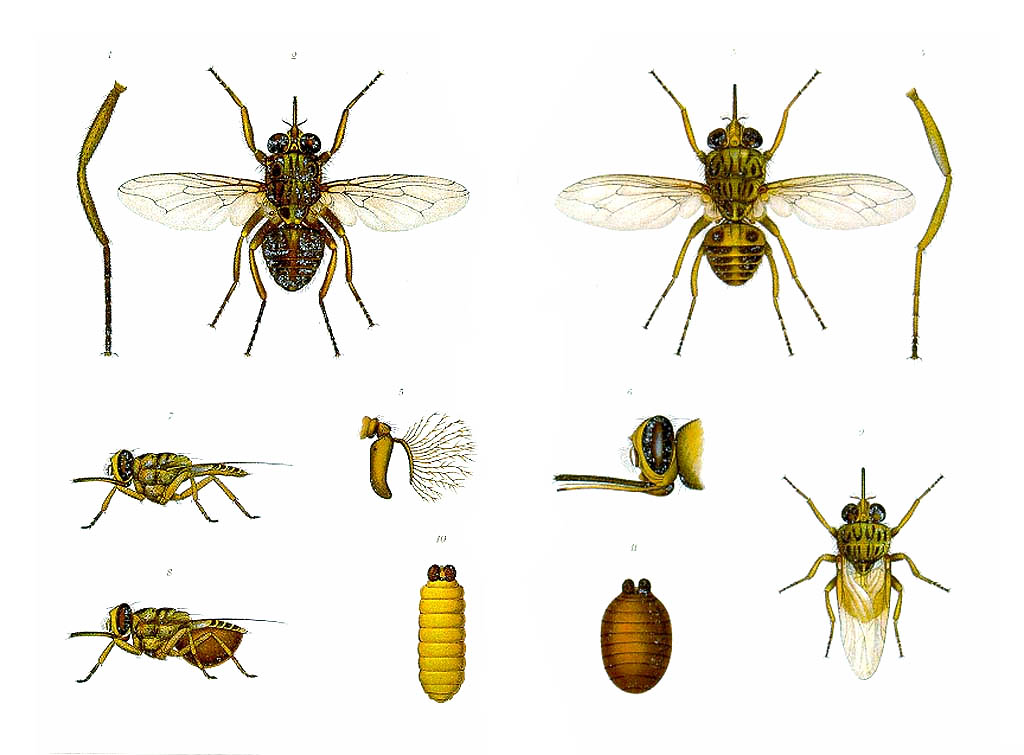
Glossina palpalis and G. morsitans from a 1920 lexicon

Tsetse flies have an unusual life cycle, which may be due to the richness of their blood food source. A female fertilizes only one egg at a time; she will retain each egg within her uterus, the offspring developing internally (during the first three larval stages), in an adaptation called adenotrophic viviparity. During this time, the female feeds the developing offspring with a milky substance (secreted by a modified gland) in the uterus. In the third larval stage, the tsetse larvae leave the uterus and begin an independent life. The newly-birthed larvae crawl into the ground and develop a hard outer shell (called the puparial case), within which they complete their morphological transformations into adult flies.

The larval life stage has a variable duration, ranging from four to ten days, and the larvae must rely on the resources shared by the mother. The importance of the richness and quality of blood to this stage can be seen; all tsetse development (prior to emerging from the puparial case as a full adult after 35 days) occurs with only the nutrition provided by the mother fly. She must get enough energy for her own survival, as well as for the resources that her offspring, whose mass can exceed that of the mother, will require until it emerges as an adult. Both the male and female tsetse flies feed on blood, however.

Technically, these insects undergo the standard development process of insects, beginning with oocyte formation, ovulation, fertilization, and development of the egg; following egg development and birth is the three larval stages, a pupal stage, and the emergence and maturation of the adult.

=== Hosts ===
Overall Suidae are the most important hosts. Waterbuck (Kobus ellipsiprymnus) are unmolested by Glossina because they produce volatiles which act as repellents. Waterbuck odor volatiles are under testing and development as repellents to protect livestock. By species, bloodmeals are derived from:

Species	Hosts
G. swynnertoni	60–70% from warthog; ~8% from giraffe
G. austeni	50–60% from bushpig; ~33% from Bovidae; possibly 10% from various duiker
G. fuscipleuris	65% from bushpig and giant forest hog; up to 20% from hippopotamus
G. tabaniformis	70% from red river hog; >7% from porcupines
G. morsitans	30–45% from warthog; 25–40% from various Bovidae, especially kudu, buffalo, bushbuck, and eland, most especially domestic cattle; ~2% from hartebeest
G. fusca	55–90% from bushbuck; 15% from red river hog; ~12% from aardvark
G. brevipalpis	up to 40% (high variability with geography) from bushpig; up to 36% from hippopotamus; ~25% from Bovidae, especially buffalo and bushbuck
G. palpalis	~3% from wild Suidae, more substantial amounts from domestic Suidae when available; ~20–40% from Bovidae (including domestic cattle) depending on geography; ~10% from waterside birds including cormorants; 25–30% from Varanus and crocodile (possibly higher in natural settings; 50% from crocodile in particular locations)
G. fuscipes	~3% from wild Suidae; ~20–40% from Bovidae (including domestic cattle) depending on geography; ~10% from waterside birds including cormorants; 25–30% from Varanus and crocodile (possibly higher in natural settings)
G. tachinoides	~3% from wild Suidae, more substantial amounts from domestic Suidae when available; ~20–40% from Bovidae (including domestic cattle) depending on geography; >7% from porcupines
G. pallidipes	55–90% from bushbuck
G. longipalpis	55–90% from bushbuck
G. longipennis	unusually dependant (~60%) on rhinoceros; ~20% from Bovidae; variably up to 12% from elephant; up to 7% from ostrich
G. m. submorsitans	~6% from various birds excluding ostrich

=== Genetics ===
The genome of Glossina morsitans was sequenced in 2014.

=== Symbionts ===
Tsetse flies have at least three bacterial symbionts. The primary symbiont is Wigglesworthia (Wigglesworthia glossinidia), which live within the fly's bacteriocytes. The second symbiont is Sodalis (Sodalis glossinidius) intercellularly or intracellularly, and the third is some kind of Wolbachia.

=== Diseases ===
The salivary gland hypertrophy virus causes abnormal bleeding in the lobes of the crop of G. m. centralis and G. m. morsitans.

== Systematics ==
Tsetse flies are members of the order Diptera, the true flies. They belong to the superfamily Hippoboscoidea, in which the tsetse's family, the Glossinidae, is one of four families of blood-feeding obligate parasites.

Up to 34 species and subspecies of tsetse flies are recognized, depending on the particular classification used.

Current classifications place all species of tsetse fly in a single genus named Glossina, with most considering the genus as the sole member of the family Glossinidae.

=== Species ===
The tsetse genus is generally split into three groups of species based on a combination of distributional, ecological, behavioral, molecular and morphological characteristics. The genus includes; savannah flies, forest flies and riverine and lacustrine flies.

==== Savannah flies ====
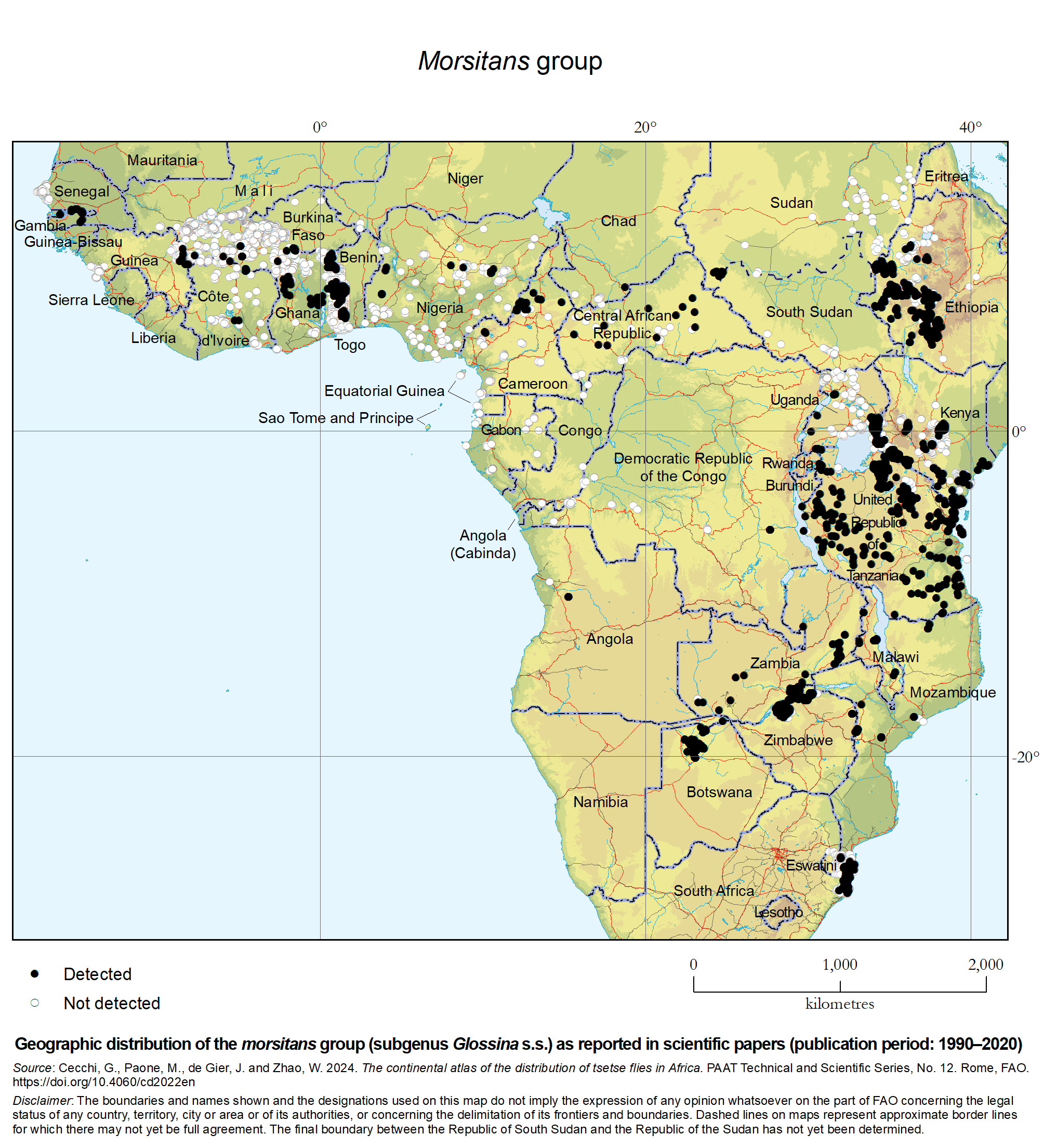
Geographic distribution of the morsitans group, subgenus Glossina s.s., as reported in scientific papers – Publication period 1990–2020

The "savannah" flies: (Morsitans group, subgenus Glossina s.s.):

- Glossina austeni (Newstead, 1912) patr. of Austen
- Glossina longipalpis (Wiedemann, 1830)
- Glossina morsitans (Westwood, 1851)
  - Glossina morsitans morsitans (Westwood, 1850)
  - Glossina morsitans submorsitans
  - Glossina morsitans centralis (Machado, 1970)
- Glossina pallidipes (Austen, 1903)
- Glossina swynnertoni (Austen, 1923) patr. of Swynnerton

==== Forest flies ====
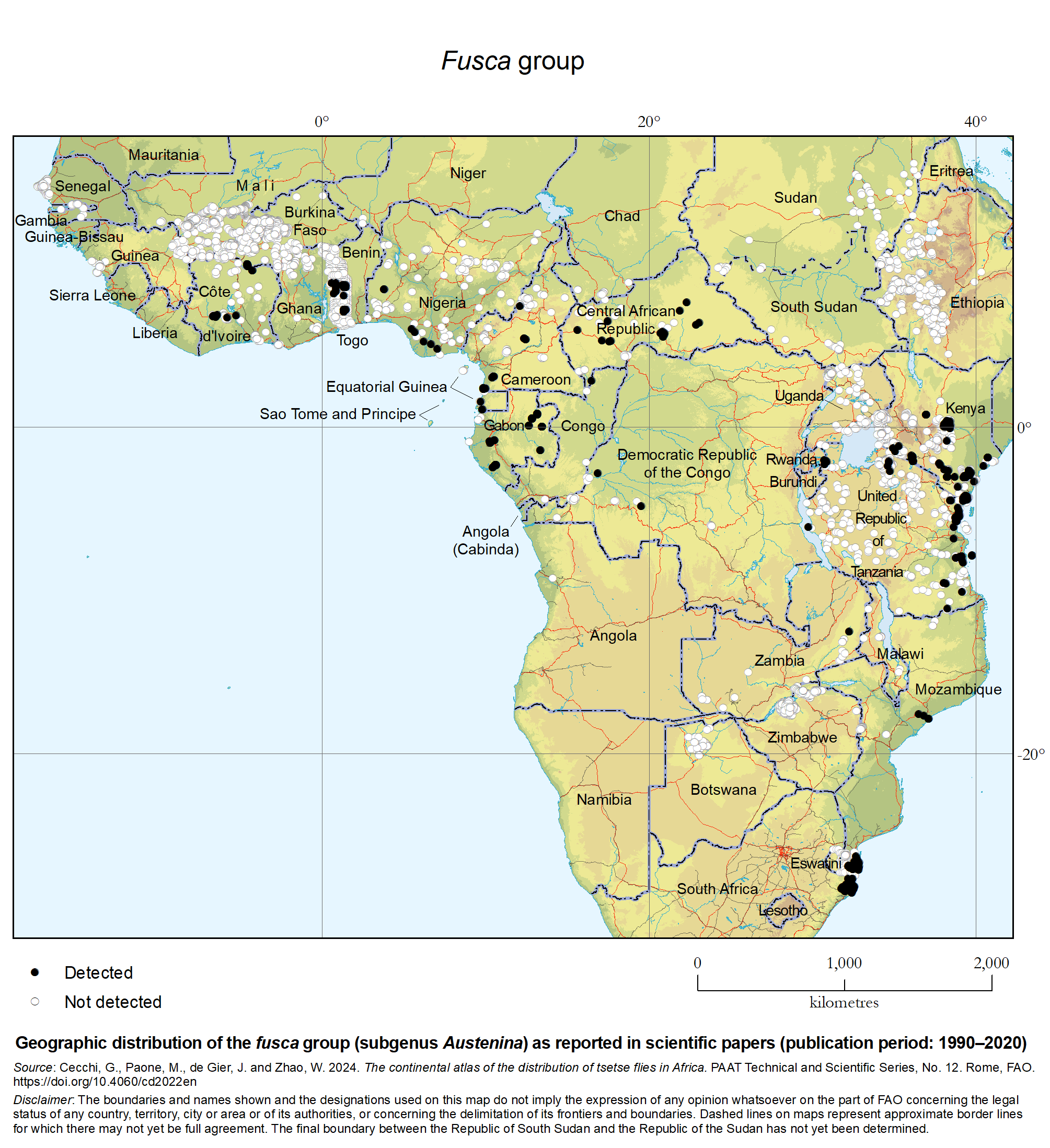
Geographic distribution of the fusca group, subgenus Austenina, as reported in scientific papers – Publication period 1990–2020

The "forest" flies: (Fusca group, subgenus Austenina):

- Glossina brevipalpis (Newstead, 1910)
- Glossina fusca (Walker, 1849)
  - Glossina fusca fusca (Walker, 1849)
  - Glossina fusca congolensis (Newstead and Evans, 1921)
- Glossina fuscipleuris (Austen, 1911)
- Glossina frezili (Gouteux, 1987)
- Glossina haningtoni (Newstead and Evans, 1922)
- Glossina longipennis (Corti, 1895)
- Glossina medicorum (Austen, 1911)
- Glossina nashi (Potts, 1955)
- Glossina nigrofusca (Newstead, 1911)
  - Glossina nigrofusca nigrofusca (Newstead, 1911)
  - Glossina nigrofusca hopkinsi (van Emden, 1944)
- Glossina schwetzi (Newstead and Evans, 1921)
- Glossina severini (Newstead, 1913)
- Glossina tabaniformis (Westwood, 1850)
- Glossina vanhoofi (Henrard, 1952)

==== Riverine and lacustrine flies ====
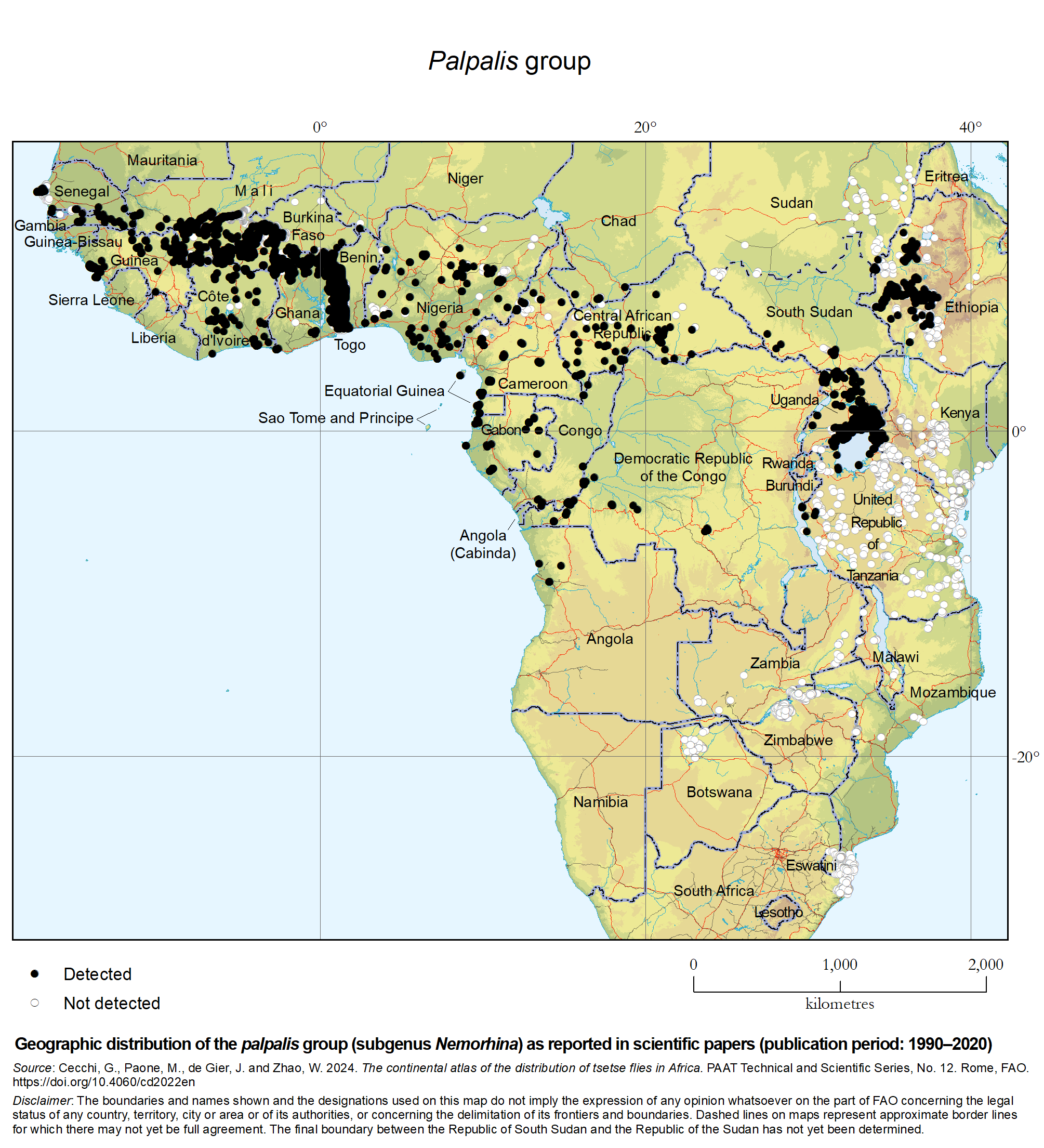
Geographic distribution of palpalis group, subgenus Nemorhina, as reported in scientific papers – Publication period 1990–2020

The "riverine" and "lacustrine" flies: (Palpalis group, subgenus Nemorhina):

- Glossina caliginea (Austen, 1911)
- Glossina fuscipes (Newstead, 1911)
  - Glossina fuscipes fuscipes (Newstead, 1911)
  - Glossina fuscipes martinii (Zumpt, 1935)
  - Glossina fuscipes quanzensis (Pires, 1948)
- Glossina pallicera (Bigot, 1891)
  - Glossina pallicera pallicera (Bigot, 1891)
  - Glossina pallicera newsteadi (Austen, 1929) patr. of Newstead
- Glossina palpalis (Robineau-Desvoidy, 1830)
  - Glossina palpalis palpalis (Robineau-Desvoidy, 1830)
  - Glossina palpalis gambiensis (Vanderplank, 1911)
- Glossina tachinoides (Westwood, 1850)

=== Evolutionary history ===
Fossil glossinids are known from the Florissant Formation in North America and the Enspel Lagerstätte of Germany, dating to the late Eocene and late Oligocene respectively.

== Range ==
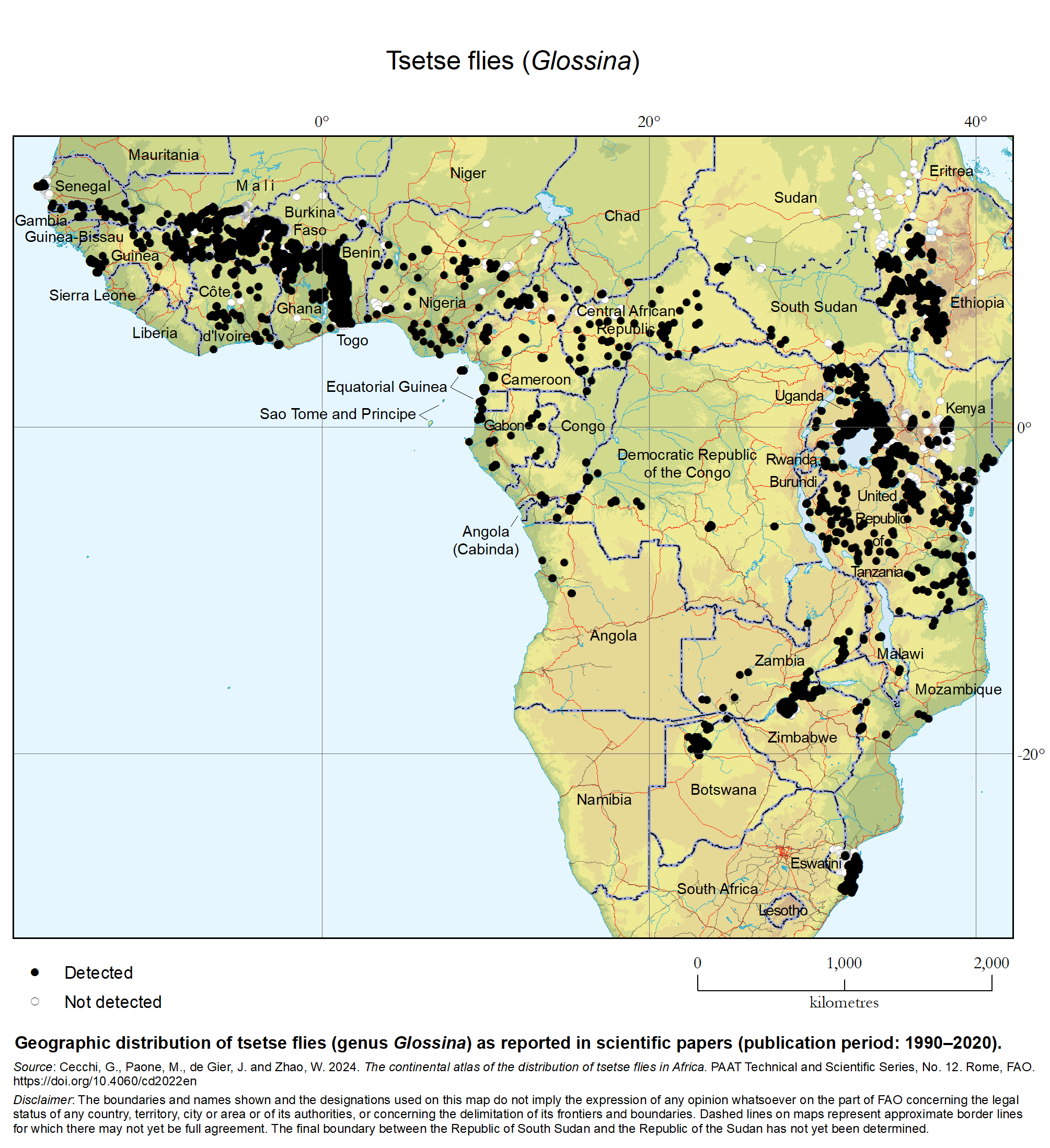
Geographic distribution of tsetse flies, genus Glossina, in Africa as reported in scientific papers – Publication period1990–2020

Glossina is almost entirely restricted to wooded grasslands and forested areas of the Afrotropics. As of 1990, tsetse flies were reported from a maximum latitude of approximately 15° north in Senegal (Niayes Region), to a minimum of 28.5° south in South Africa (KwaZulu-Natal Province).

Only two subspecies - G. f. fuscipes and G. m. submorsitans - are present in the very southwest of Saudi Arabia. Although Carter found G. tachiniodes in 1903 nearby, near Aden in southern Yemen, there have been no confirmations since.

== Trypanosomiasis ==
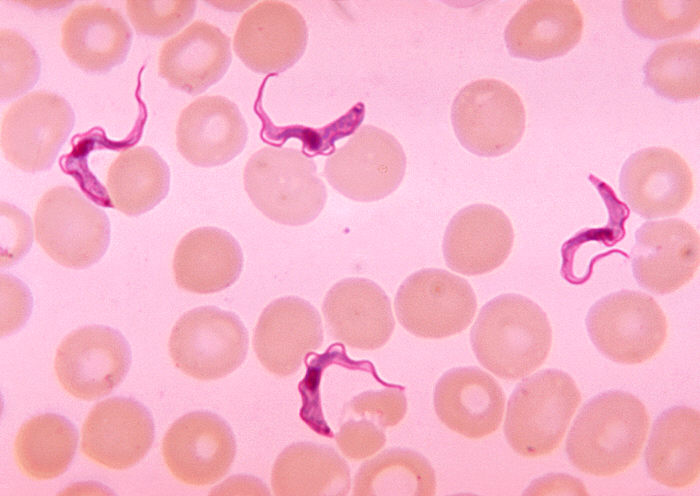
Trypanosomes in a blood smear

Tsetse are biological vectors of trypanosomes, meaning that in the process of feeding, they acquire and then transmit small, single-celled trypanosomes from infected vertebrate hosts to uninfected animals. Some tsetse-transmitted trypanosome species cause trypanosomiasis, an infectious disease. In humans, tsetse transmitted trypanosomiasis is called sleeping sickness. In animals, tsetse-vectored trypanosomiases include nagana, souma (a French term which may not be a distinct condition), and surra according to the animal infected and the trypanosome species involved. The usage is not strict and while nagana generally refers to the disease in cattle and horses it is commonly used for any of the animal trypanosomiases.

Trypanosomes are animal parasites, specifically protozoans of the genus Trypanosoma. These organisms are about the size of red blood cells. Different species of trypanosomes infect different hosts. They range widely in their effects on the vertebrate hosts. Some species, such as T. theileri, do not seem to cause any health problems except perhaps in animals that are already sick.

Some strains are much more virulent. Infected flies have an altered salivary composition which lowers feeding efficiency and consequently increases the feeding time, promoting trypanosome transmission to the vertebrate host. These trypanosomes are highly evolved and have developed a life cycle that requires periods in both the vertebrate and tsetse hosts.

Tsetse transmit trypanosomes in two ways, mechanical and biological transmission.

- Mechanical transmission involves the direct transmission of the same individual trypanosomes taken from an infected host into an uninfected host. The name "mechanical" reflects the similarity of this mode of transmission to mechanical injection with a syringe. Mechanical transmission requires the tsetse to feed on an infected host and acquire trypanosomes in the blood meal, and then, within a relatively short period, to feed on an uninfected host and regurgitate some of the infected blood from the first blood meal into the tissue of the uninfected animal. This type of transmission occurs most frequently when tsetse are interrupted during a blood meal and attempt to satiate themselves with another meal. Other flies, such as horse-flies, can also cause mechanical transmission of trypanosomes.
- Biological transmission requires a period of incubation of the trypanosomes within the tsetse host. The term 'biological' is used because trypanosomes must reproduce through several generations inside the tsetse host during the period of incubation (development within the fly is known as the extrinsic incubation period), which requires extreme adaptation of the trypanosomes to their tsetse host. In this mode of transmission, trypanosomes reproduce through several generations, changing in morphology at certain periods. This mode of transmission also includes the sexual phase of the trypanosomes. Tsetse are believed to be more likely to become infected by trypanosomes during their first few blood meals. Tsetse infected by trypanosomes are thought to remain infected for the remainder of their lives. Because of the adaptations required for biological transmission, trypanosomes that can be transmitted biologically by tsetse cannot be transmitted in this manner by other insects.

The relative importance of these two modes of transmission for the propagation of tsetse-vectored trypanosomiases is not yet well understood. However, since the sexual phase of the trypanosome life cycle occurs within the tsetse host, biological transmission is a required step in the life cycle of the tsetse-vectored trypanosomes.

The cycle of biological transmission of trypanosomiasis involves two phases, one inside the tsetse host and the other inside the vertebrate host. Trypanosomes are not passed between a pregnant tsetse and her offspring, so all newly emerged tsetse adults are free of infection. An uninfected fly that feeds on an infected vertebrate animal may acquire trypanosomes in its proboscis or gut. These trypanosomes, depending on the species, may remain in place, move to a different part of the digestive tract, or migrate through the tsetse body into the salivary glands. When an infected tsetse bites a susceptible host, the fly may regurgitate part of a previous blood meal that contains trypanosomes, or may inject trypanosomes in its saliva. Inoculation must contain a minimum of 300 to 450 individual trypanosomes to be successful, and may contain up to 40,000 cells.

In the case of T. b. brucei infecting G. p. gambiensis, during this time the parasite changes the proteome contents of the fly's head. This may be the reason/a reason for the behavioral changes seen, especially the unnecessarily increased feeding frequency, which increases transmission opportunities. This may be due in part to the altered glucose metabolism observed, causing a perceived need for more calories. (The metabolic change, in turn, being due to complete absence of glucose-6-phosphate 1-dehydrogenase in infected flies.) Monoamine neurotransmitter synthesis is also altered: Production of aromatic L-amino acid decarboxylase - involved in dopamine and serotonin synthesis - and α-methyldopa hypersensitive protein was induced. This is very similar to the alterations in other dipteran vectors' head proteomes under infection by other eukaryotic parasites of mammals, found in another study by the same team in the same year.

The trypanosomes are injected into vertebrate muscle tissue, but make their way, first into the lymphatic system, then into the bloodstream, and eventually into the brain. The disease causes the swelling of the lymph glands, emaciation of the body, and eventually leads to death. Uninfected tsetse may bite the infected animal prior to its death and acquire the disease, thereby closing the transmission cycle.

=== Disease hosts and vectors ===
The tsetse-vectored trypanosomiases affect various vertebrate species including humans, antelopes, bovine cattle, camels, horses, sheep, goats, and pigs. These diseases are caused by several different trypanosome species that may also survive in wild animals such as crocodiles and monitor lizards. The diseases have different distributions across the African continent, so are transmitted by different species. This table summarizes this information:

Disease	Species affected	Trypanosoma agents	Distribution	Glossina vectors
Sleeping sickness — chronic form	humans	T. brucei gambiense	Western Africa	G. palpalis; G. tachinoides; G. fuscipes; G. morsitans
Sleeping sickness — acute form	humans	T. brucei rhodesiense	Eastern Africa	G. morsitans; G. swynnertoni; G. pallidipes; G. fuscipes
Nagana — acute form	antelope cattle camels horses	T. brucei brucei	Africa	G. morsitans; G. swynnertoni; G. pallidipes; G. palpalis; G. tachinoides; G. fuscipes
Nagana — chronic form	cattle camels horses	T. congolense	Africa	G. palpalis; G. morsitans; G. austeni; G. swynnertoni; G. pallidipes; G. longipalpis; G. tachinoides; G. brevipalpis
Nagana — acute form	domestic pigs cattle camels horses	T. simiae	Africa	G. palpalis; G. fuscipes; G. morsitans; G. tachinoides; G. longipalpis; G. fusca; G. tabaniformis; G. brevipalpis; G. vanhoofi; G. austeni
Nagana — acute form	cattle camels horses	T. vivax	Africa	G. morsitans; G. palpalis; G. tachinoides; G. swynnertoni; G. pallidipes; G. austeni; G. vanhoofi; G. longipalpis
Surra — chronic form	domestic pigs warthog —(Phacochoerus aethiopicus) forest hogs —(Hylochoerus spp.)	T. suis	Africa	G. palpalis; G. fuscipes; G. morsitans; G. tachinoides; G. longipalpis; G. fusca; G. tabaniformis; G. brevipalpis; G. vanhoofi; G. austeni

=== In humans ===
Human African trypanosomiasis, also called sleeping sickness, is caused by trypanosomes of the species Trypanosoma brucei. This disease is invariably fatal if left untreated, but can almost always be cured with current medicines if the disease is diagnosed early enough.

Sleeping sickness begins with a tsetse bite leading to an inoculation in the subcutaneous tissue. The infection moves into the lymphatic system, leading to a characteristic swelling of the lymph glands called Winterbottom's sign. The infection progresses into the blood stream and eventually crosses into the central nervous system and invades the brain leading to extreme lethargy and eventually to death.

The species Trypanosoma brucei, which causes the disease, has often been subdivided into three subspecies that were identified based either on the vertebrate hosts which the strain could infect or on the virulence of the disease in humans. The trypanosomes infectious to animals and not to humans were named Trypanosoma brucei brucei. Strains that infected humans were divided into two subspecies based on their different virulences: Trypanosoma brucei gambiense was thought to have a slower onset and Trypanosoma brucei rhodesiense refers to strains with a more rapid, virulent onset. This characterization has always been problematic but was the best that could be done given the knowledge of the time and the tools available for identification. A recent molecular study using restriction fragment length polymorphism analysis suggests that the three subspecies are polyphyletic, so the elucidation of the strains of T. brucei infective to humans requires a more complex explanation. Procyclins are proteins developed in the surface coating of trypanosomes whilst in their tsetse fly vector.

Other forms of human trypanosomiasis also exist but are not transmitted by tsetse. The most notable is American trypanosomiasis, known as Chagas disease, which occurs in South America, caused by Trypanosoma cruzi, and transmitted by certain insects of the Reduviidae, members of the Hemiptera.

=== In domestic animals ===
Animal trypanosomiasis, also called nagana when it occurs in bovine cattle or horses or sura when it occurs in domestic pigs, is caused by several trypanosome species. These diseases reduce the growth rate, milk productivity, and strength of farm animals, generally leading to the eventual death of the infected animals. Certain species of cattle are called trypanotolerant because they can survive and grow even when infected with trypanosomes although they also have lower productivity rates when infected.

The course of the disease in animals is similar to the course of sleeping sickness in humans.

Trypanosoma congolense and Trypanosoma vivax are the two most important species infecting bovine cattle in sub-Saharan Africa. Trypanosoma simiae causes a virulent disease in swine.

Other forms of animal trypanosomiasis are also known from other areas of the globe, caused by different species of trypanosomes and transmitted without the intervention of the tsetse fly.

The tsetse fly vector ranges mostly in the central part of Africa.

Trypanosomiasis poses a considerable constraint on livestock agricultural development in tsetse fly-infested areas of sub-Saharan Africa, especially in West and Central Africa. International research conducted by ILRI in Nigeria, the Democratic Republic of the Congo and Kenya has shown that the N'Dama is the most resistant breed.

== Control ==
The eradication of sleeping sickness and nagana would be of immense benefit to rural development and contribute to poverty alleviation and improved food security in sub-Saharan Africa, although, with the current tools, the complete eradication of the disease is not considered feasible. Human African trypanosomosis (HAT) and animal African trypanosomosis (AAT) are sufficiently important to make virtually any intervention against these diseases beneficial.

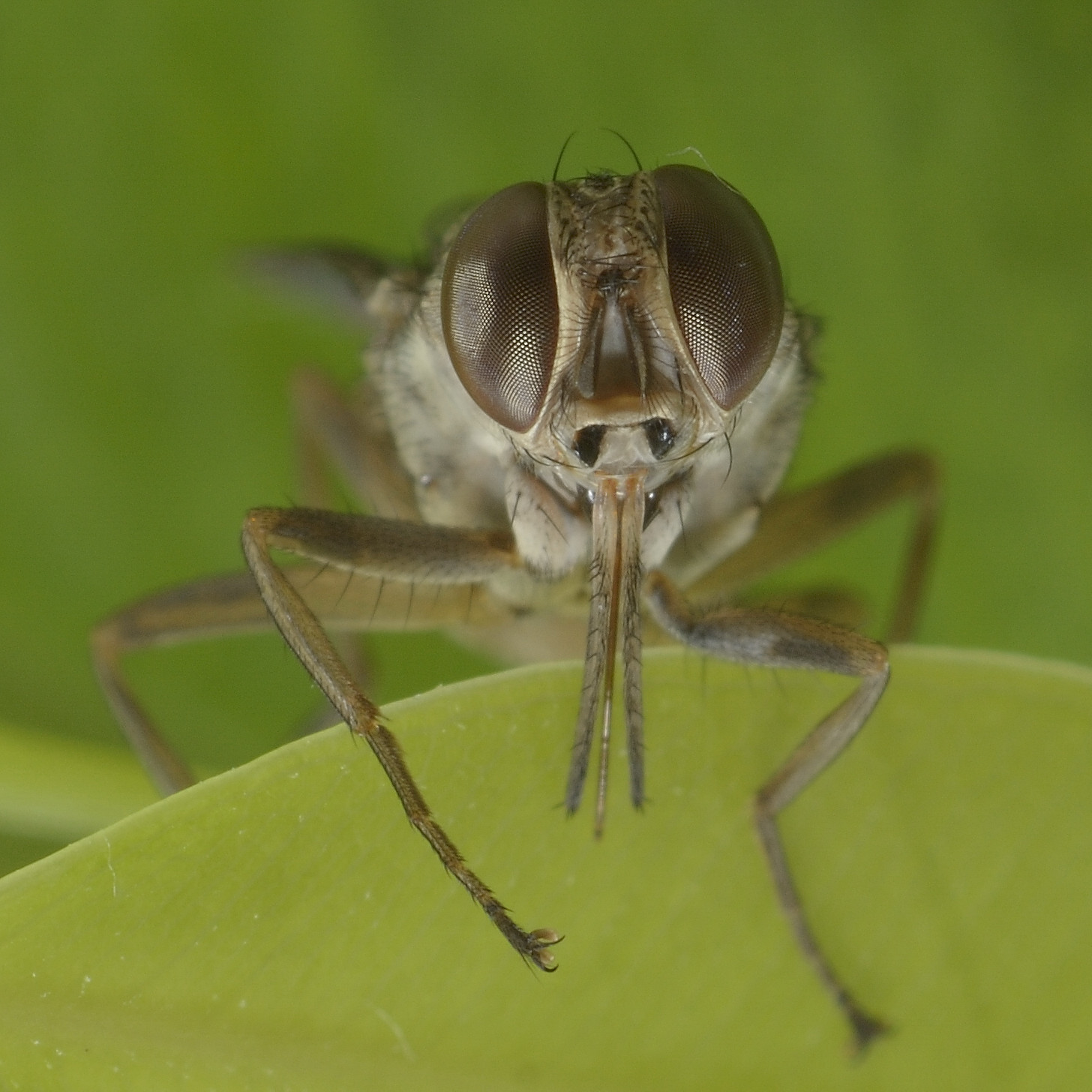
Tsetse fly from Burkina Faso

The disease can be managed by controlling the vector and thus reducing the incidence of the disease by disrupting the transmission cycle. Another tactic to manage the disease is to target the disease directly using surveillance and curative or prophylactic treatments to reduce the number of hosts that carry the disease.

Economic analysis indicates that the cost of managing trypanosomiasis through the elimination of important populations of major tsetse vectors will be covered several times by the benefits of tsetse-free status. Area-wide interventions against the tsetse and trypanosomiasis problem appear more efficient and profitable if sufficiently large areas, with high numbers of cattle, can be covered.

Vector control strategies can aim at either continuous suppression or eradication of target populations. Tsetse fly eradication programmes are complex and logistically demanding activities and usually involve the integration of different control tactics, such as trypanocidal drugs, impregnated treated targets (ITT), insecticide-treated cattle (ITC), aerial spraying (Sequential Aerosol Technique - SAT) and in some situations the release of sterile males (sterile insect technique – SIT). To ensure sustainability of the results, it is critical to apply the control tactics on an area-wide basis, i.e. targeting an entire tsetse population that is preferably genetically isolated.

=== Control techniques ===
Many techniques have reduced tsetse populations, with earlier, crude methods recently replaced by methods that are cheaper, more directed, and ecologically better.

==== Slaughter of wild animals ====
One early technique involved slaughtering all the wild animals tsetse fed on. For example, the island of Principe off the west coast of Africa was entirely cleared of feral pigs in the 1930s, which led to the extirpation of the fly. While the fly eventually re-invaded in the 1950s, the new population of tsetse was free from the disease.

==== Land clearing ====
Another early technique involved complete removal of brush and woody vegetation from an area. However, the technique was not widely used and has been abandoned. Tsetse tend to rest on the trunks of trees so removing woody vegetation made the area inhospitable to the flies. Until about 1959 this was done by hand and so was quite time consuming. Glover et al 1959 describes the technique which they call "chain clearing". Chain clearing drags a chain forward between two heavy vehicles and thereby does the same job much more quickly - but still at some expense. Preventing regrowth of woody vegetation requires continuous clearing efforts which is even more expensive, and only practical where large human populations are present. Also, the clearing of woody vegetation has come to be seen as an environmental problem more than a benefit.

==== Pesticide campaigns ====
Pesticides have been used to control tsetse starting initially during the early part of the twentieth century in localized efforts using the inorganic metal-based pesticides, expanding after the Second World War into massive aerial- and ground-based campaigns with organochlorine pesticides such as DDT applied as aerosol sprays at Ultra-Low Volume rates. Later, more targeted techniques used pour-on formulations in which advanced organic pesticides were applied directly to the backs of cattle.

==== Trapping ====
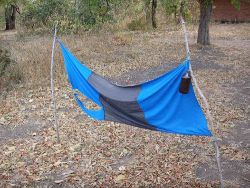
Tsetse trap

Tsetse populations can be monitored and effectively controlled using simple, inexpensive traps. These often use blue cloth, either in sheet or biconical form, since this color attracts the flies. The traps work by channeling the flies into a collection chamber, or by exposing the flies to insecticide sprayed on the cloth. Early traps mimicked the form of cattle, as tsetse are also attracted to large dark colors like the hides of cows and buffaloes. Some scientists put forward the idea that zebra have stripes, not as a camouflage in long grass, but because the black and white bands tend to confuse tsetse and prevent attack.

The use of chemicals as attractants to lure tsetse to the traps has been studied extensively in the late 20th century, but this has mostly been of interest to scientists rather than as an economically reasonable solution. Attractants studied have been those tsetse might use to find food, like carbon dioxide, octenol, and acetone—which are given off in animals' breath and distributed downwind in an odor plume. Synthetic versions of these chemicals can create artificial odor plumes. A cheaper approach is to place cattle urine in a half gourd near the trap. For large trapping efforts, additional traps are generally cheaper than expensive artificial attractants.

A special trapping method is applied in Ethiopia, where the BioFarm Consortium (ICIPE, BioVision Foundation, BEA, Helvetas, DLCO-EA, Praxis Ethiopia) applies the traps in a sustainable agriculture and rural development context (SARD). The traps are just the entry point, followed by improved farming, human health and marketing inputs. This method is in the final stage of testing (as of 2006).

==== Sterile insect technique ====
The sterile insect technique (SIT) is a form of pest control that uses ionizing radiation (gamma ray or X-ray) to sterilize male flies that are mass-produced in special rearing facilities. The sterile males are released systematically from the ground or by air in tsetse-infested areas, where they mate with wild females, which do not produce offspring. As a result, this technique can eventually eradicate populations of wild flies. SIT is among the most environmentally friendly control tactics available, and is usually applied as the final component of an integrated campaign. It has been used to subdue the populations of many other fly species including the medfly, Ceratitis capitata.

The sustainable removal of the tsetse fly is in many cases the most cost-effective way of dealing with the T&T problem resulting in major economic benefits for subsistence farmers in rural areas. Insecticide-based methods are normally very ineffective in removing the last remnants of tsetse populations, while, on the contrary, sterile males are very effective in finding and mating the last remaining females. Therefore, the integration of the SIT as the last component of an area-wide integrated approach is essential in many situations to achieve complete eradication of the different tsetse populations, particularly in areas of more dense vegetation.

A project that was implemented from 1994 to 1997 on the Island of Unguja, Zanzibar (United Republic of Tanzania), demonstrated that, after suppression of the tsetse population with insecticides, SIT completely removed the Glossina austeni Newstead population from the Island. This was carried out without any understanding of the population genetics of G. a., but future SIT efforts can benefit from such preparation. Population genetics would help to select the Glossina population to be deployed for similarity to the target population. The eradication of the tsetse fly from Unguja Island in 1997 was followed by the disappearance of the AAT which enabled farmers to integrate livestock keeping with cropping in areas where this had been impossible before. The increased livestock and crop productivity and the possibility of using animals for transport and traction significantly contributed to an increase in the quality of people's lives. Surveys in 1999, 2002, 2014, and 2015 have confirmed this success - continued absence of tsetse and nagana on the island.

In the Niayes region of Senegal, a coastal area close to Dakar, livestock keeping was difficult due to the presence of a population of Glossina palpalis gambiensis. Feasibility studies indicated that the fly population was confined to very fragmented habitats and a population genetics study indicated that the population was genetically isolated from the main tsetse belt in the south eastern part of Senegal. After completion of the feasibility studies (2006–2010), an area-wide integrated eradication campaign that included an SIT component was started in 2011, and by 2015, the Niayes region had become almost tsetse fly free. This has allowed a change of cattle breeds from lower producing trypanotolerant breeds to higher-producing foreign breeds.

The entire target area (Block 1, 2 and 3) has a total surface of 1,000 square kilometres (390 sq mi), and the first block (northern part) can be considered free of tsetse, as intensive monitoring has failed to detect since 2012 a single wild tsetse fly. The prevalence of AAT has decreased from 40 to 50% before the project started to less than 10% to date in blocks 1 and 2. Although insecticides are being used for fly suppression, they are applied for short periods on traps, nets and livestock, and are not spread into the environment. After the suppression activities are completed, no more insecticide is applied in the area. The removal of trypanosomosis will eliminate the need for constant prophylactic treatments of the cattle with trypanocidal drugs, therefore reducing residues of these drugs in the dung, meat and milk.

The main beneficiaries of the project are the many small holder farmers, the larger commercial farms and the consumers of meat and milk. According to a socio-economic survey and benefit cost analysis, after eradication of the tsetse farmers will be able to replace their local breeds with improved breeds and increase their annual income by €2.8 million. In addition, it is expected that the number of cattle will be reduced by 45%, which will result in a reduced environmental footprint.

== Societal effects ==
In the literature of environmental determinism, the tsetse has been linked to difficulties during early state formation for areas where the fly is prevalent. A 2012 study used population growth models, physiological data, and ethnographic data to examine pre-colonial agricultural practices and isolate the effects of the fly. A "tsetse suitability index" was developed from insect population growth, climate and geospatial data to simulate the fly's population steady state. An increase in the tsetse suitability index was associated with a statistically significant weakening of the agriculture, levels of urbanization, institutions and subsistence strategies. Results suggest that the tsetse decimated livestock populations, forcing early states to rely on slave labor to clear land for farming, and preventing farmers from taking advantage of natural animal fertilizers to increase crop production. These long-term effects may have kept population density low and discouraged cooperation between small-scale communities, thus preventing stronger nations from forming.

The authors also suggest that under a lower burden of tsetse, Africa would have developed differently. Agriculture (measured by the usage of large domesticated animals, intensive agriculture, plow use and female participation rate in agriculture) as well as institutions (measured by the appearance of indigenous slavery and levels of centralization) would have been more like those found in Eurasia. Qualitative support for this claim comes from archaeological findings; e.g., Great Zimbabwe is located in the African highlands where the fly does not occur, and represented the largest and technically most advanced precolonial structure in Southern sub-Sahara Africa.

Other authors are more skeptical that the tsetse fly had such an immense influence on African development. One conventional argument is that the tsetse fly made it difficult to use draught animals. Hence, wheeled forms of transportations were not used as well. While this is certainly true for areas with high densities of the fly, similar cases outside tsetse-suitable areas exist. While the fly definitely had a relevant influence on the adoption of new technologies in Africa, it has been contended that it does not represent the single root cause.

=== History ===
According to an article in the New Scientist, the depopulated and apparently primevally wild Africa seen in wildlife documentary films was formed in the 19th century by disease, a combination of rinderpest and the tsetse fly. Rinderpest is believed to have originated in Asia, later spreading through the transport of cattle. In 1887, the rinderpest virus was accidentally imported in livestock brought by an Italian expeditionary force to Eritrea. It spread rapidly, reaching Ethiopia by 1888, the Atlantic coast by 1892 and South Africa by 1897. Rinderpest, a cattle plague from central Asia, killed over 90% of the cattle of the pastoral peoples such as the Masai of east Africa. In South Africa, with no native immunity, most of the livestock – some 5.5 million domestic cattle – died. Pastoralists and farmers were left with no animals – their source of income – and farmers were deprived of their working animals for ploughing and irrigation. The pandemic coincided with a period of drought, causing widespread famine. The starving human populations died of smallpox, cholera, and typhoid, as well as African Sleeping Sickness and other endemic diseases. It is estimated that two-thirds of the Masai died in 1891.

The land was left emptied of its cattle and its people, enabling the colonial powers Germany and Britain to take over Tanzania and Kenya with little effort. With greatly reduced grazing, grassland turned rapidly to bush. The closely cropped grass sward was replaced in a few years by woody grassland and thornbush, ideal habitat for tsetse flies. Wild mammal populations increased rapidly, accompanied by the tsetse fly. Highland regions of east Africa which had been free of tsetse fly were colonised by the pest, accompanied by sleeping sickness, until then unknown in the area. Millions of people died of the disease in the early 20th century.

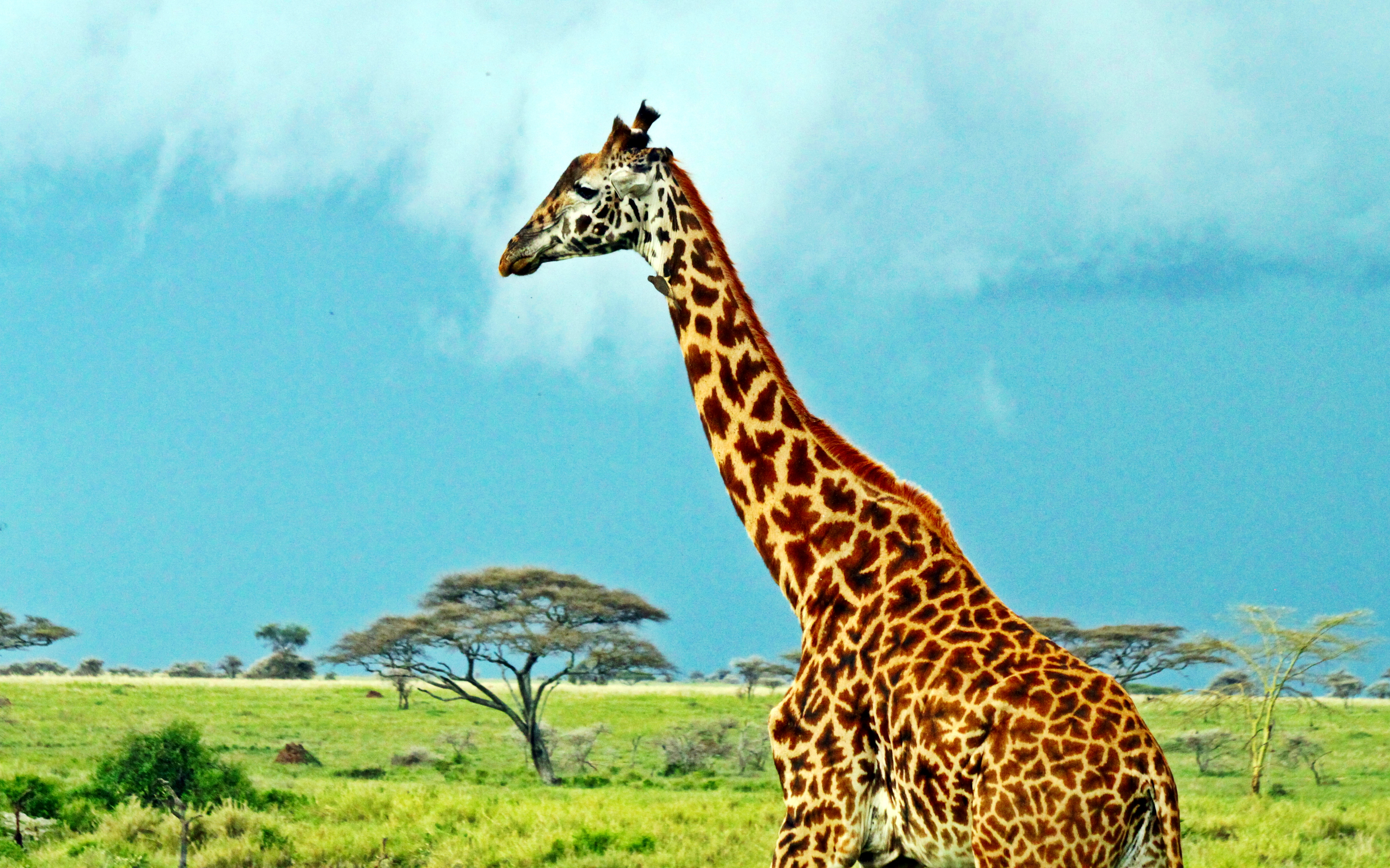
Serengeti National Park, Tanzania

The areas occupied by the tsetse fly were largely barred to animal husbandry. Sleeping sickness was dubbed "the best game warden in Africa" by conservationists, who assumed that the land, empty of people and full of game animals, had always been like that. Julian Huxley of the World Wildlife Fund called the plains of east Africa "a surviving sector of the rich natural world as it was before the rise of modern man". They created numerous large reserves for hunting safaris. In 1909 the newly retired president Theodore Roosevelt went on a safari that brought over 10,000 animal carcasses to America. Later, much of the land was turned over to nature reserves and national parks such as the Serengeti, Masai Mara, Kruger and Okavango Delta. The result, across eastern and southern Africa, is a modern landscape of manmade ecosystems: farmland and pastoral land largely free of bush and tsetse fly; and bush controlled by the tsetse fly.

Although the colonial powers saw the disease as a threat to their interests, and acted accordingly to bring transmission almost to a halt in the 1960s, this improved situation led to a laxity of surveillance and management by the newly independent governments covering the same areas - and a resurgence that became a crisis again in the 1990s.

=== Current situation ===
Tsetse flies are regarded as a major cause of rural poverty in sub-Saharan Africa because they prevent mixed farming. The land infested with tsetse flies is often cultivated by people using hoes rather than more efficient draught animals because nagana, the disease transmitted by tsetse, weakens and often kills these animals. Cattle that do survive produce little milk, pregnant cows often abort their calves, and manure is not available to fertilize the worn-out soils.

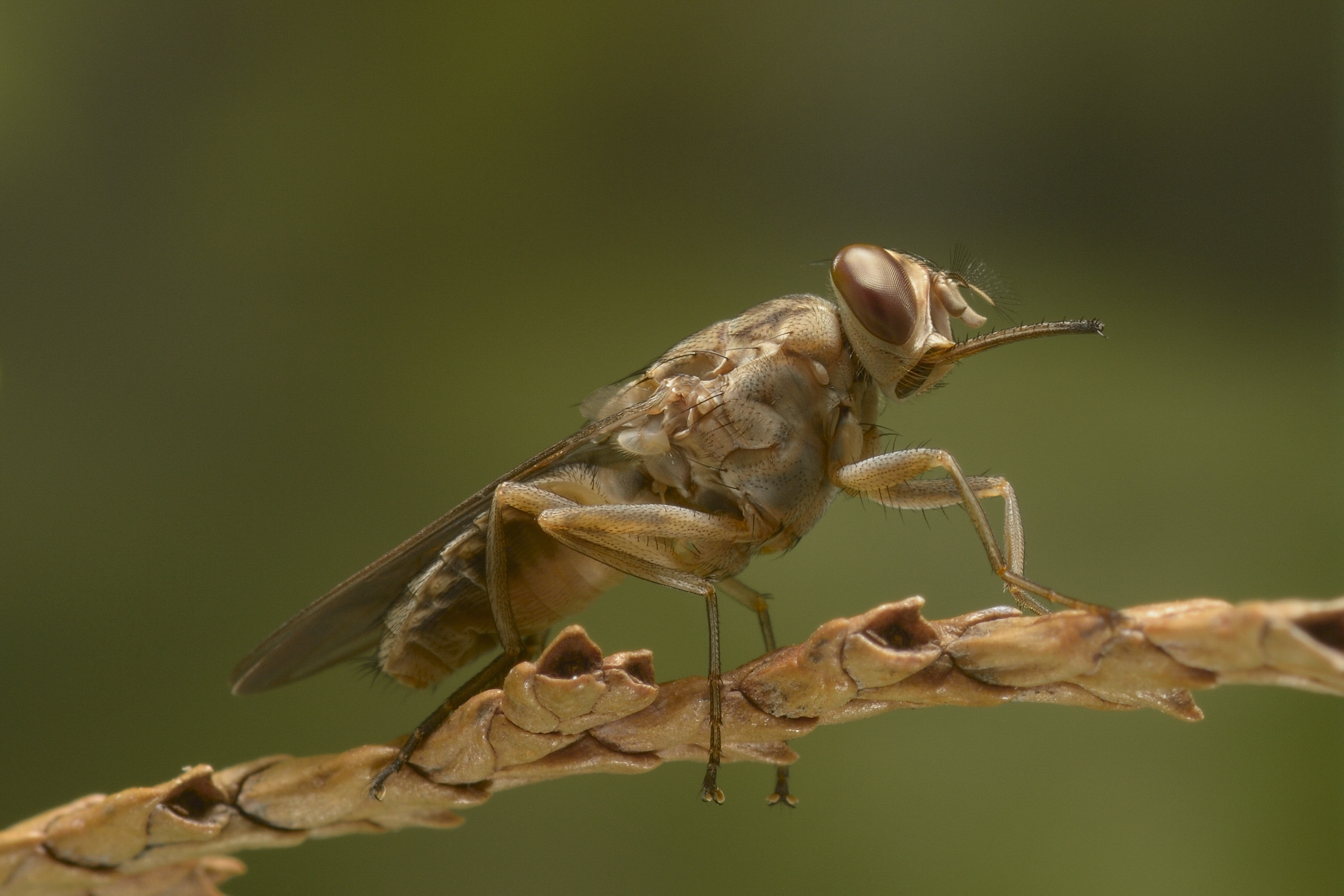
Tsetse fly from Burkina Faso

The disease nagana or African animal trypanosomiasis (AAT) causes gradual health decline in infected livestock, reduces milk and meat production, and increases abortion rates. Animals eventually succumb to the disease - annual cattle deaths caused by trypanosomiasis are estimated at 3 million, reducing annual cattle production value by US$600m-US$1.2b. This has an enormous effect on the livelihood of farmers who live in tsetse-infested areas, as infected animals cannot be used to plough the land, and keeping cattle is only feasible when the animals are kept under constant prophylactic treatment with trypanocidal drugs, often with associated problems of drug resistance, counterfeited drugs, and suboptimal dosage. The overall annual direct lost potential in livestock and crop production was estimated at US$4.5 billion-US$4.75b.

The tsetse fly lives in nearly 10,000,000 square kilometres (4,000,000 sq mi) in sub-Saharan Africa (mostly wet tropical forest) and many parts of this large area is fertile land that is left uncultivated—a so-called green desert not used by humans and cattle. Most of the 38 countries infested with tsetse are poor, debt-ridden and underdeveloped. Of the 38 tsetse-infested countries, 32 are low-income, food-deficit countries, 29 are least developed countries, and 30 or 34 are among the 40 most heavily indebted poor countries. Eradicating the tsetse and trypanosomiasis (T&T) problem would allow rural Africans to use these areas for animal husbandry or the cultivation of crops and hence increase food production. Only 45 million cattle, of 172 million present in sub-Saharan Africa, are kept in tsetse-infested areas but are often forced into fragile ecosystems like highlands or the semiarid Sahel zone, which increases overgrazing and overuse of land for food production.

In addition to this direct effect, the presence of tsetse and trypanosomiasis discourages the use of more productive exotic and cross-bred cattle, depresses the growth and affects the distribution of livestock populations, reduces the potential opportunities for livestock and crop production (mixed farming) through less draught power to cultivate land and less manure to fertilize (in an environment-friendly way) soils for better crop production, and affects human settlements (people tend to avoid areas with tsetse flies).

Tsetse flies transmit a similar disease to humans, called African trypanosomiasis, human African trypanosomiasis (HAT) or sleeping sickness. An estimated 60-70 million people in 20 countries are at different levels of risk and only 3-4 million people are covered by active surveillance. The DALY index (disability-adjusted life years), an indicator to quantify the burden of disease, includes the effects of both the duration of life lost due to premature death and the duration of life lived with a disability. The annual burden of sleeping sickness is estimated at 2 million DALYs. Since the disease tends to affect economically active adults, the total cost to a family with a patient is about 25% of a year's income.

== History of study ==
In East Africa, C. F. M. Swynnerton played a large role in the first half of the 20th century. Swynnerton did much of the earliest tsetse ecology research. For this E. E. Austen named a patronymic taxon for him, G. swynnertoni, in 1922.

== Resistance to trypanosomes ==
Tsetse flies have an arsenal of immune defenses to resist each stage of the trypanosome infectious cycle, and thus are relatively refractory to trypanosome infection. Among the host flies' defenses is the production of hydrogen peroxide, a reactive oxygen species that damages DNA. These defenses limit the population of infected flies.

== See also ==
- David Bruce (microbiologist)
- G. D. Hale Carpenter joined the London School of Hygiene and Tropical Medicine, and took the DM in 1913 with a dissertation on the tsetse fly (Glossina palpalis) and sleeping sickness. He published: A Naturalist on Lake Victoria, with an Account of Sleeping Sickness and the Tse-tse Fly; 1920. T.F. Unwin Ltd, London; Biodiversity Archive
- Muriel Robertson, who conducted early 20th-century research on the insect
- Use of DNA in forensic entomology
- Horses in Botswana
