= Glossina austeni =

Scientific classification
- Kingdom: Animalia
- Phylum: Arthropoda
- Class: Insecta
- Order: Diptera
- Family: Glossinidae
- Genus: Glossina
- Species: G. austeni

Binomial name
- Glossina austeni Newstead, 1912) patr. of Austen
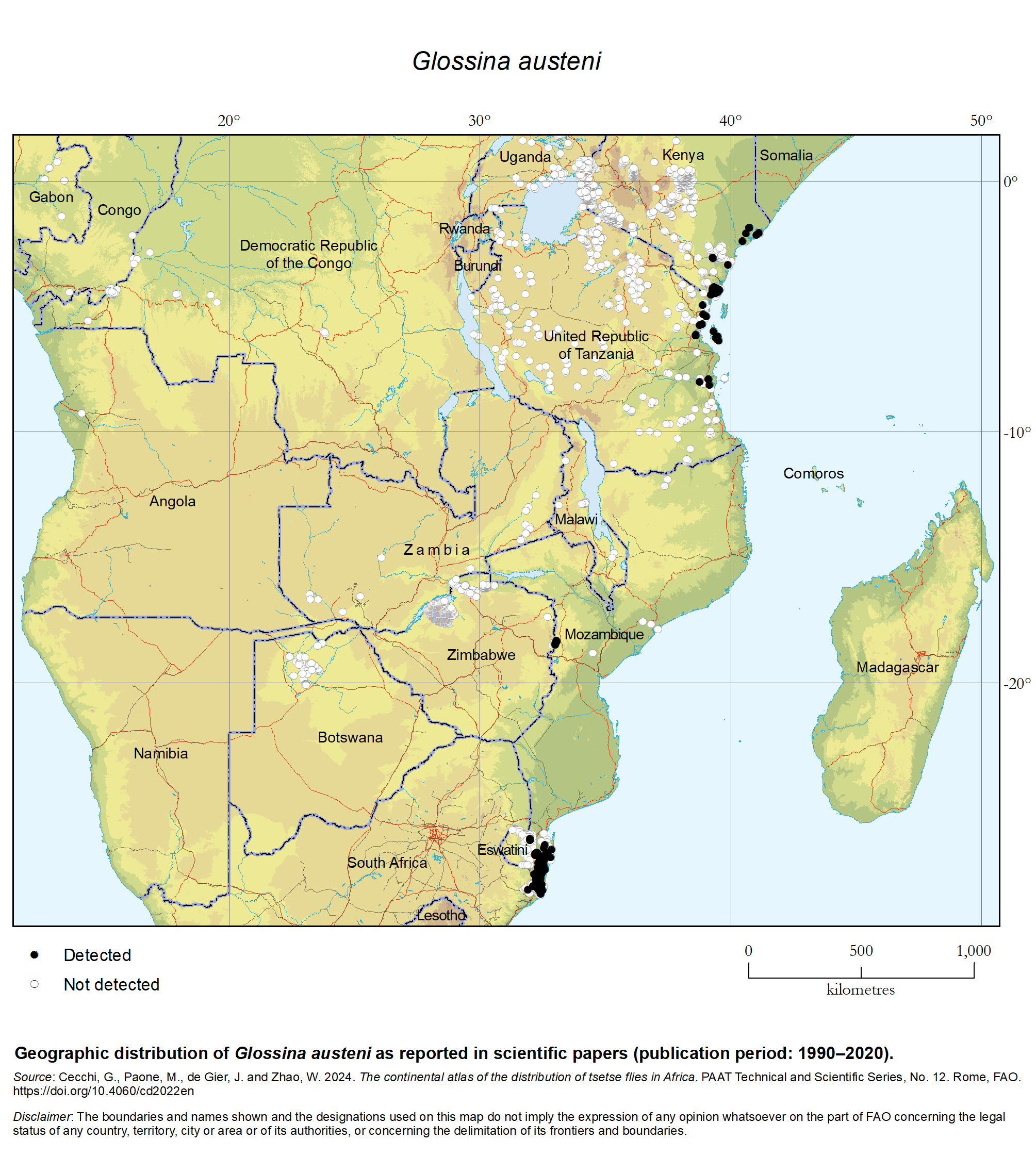
- Geographic distribution of Glossina austeni as reported in scientific papers – Publication period 1990–2020

Species of tsetse fly

Glossina austeni is one of the 23 recognized species of tsetse flies (genus Glossina) and it belongs to the savannah/morsitans group (subgenus Glossina s.s.). Glossina austeni can transmit African trypanosomasis among livestock and wildlife, whilst it is not considered to be involved in the transmission of the human form of the disease.

== Distribution ==
Glossina austeni was known to occur in African countries along the eastern coast, from South Africa to Somalia, but also including Eswatini and Zimbabwe. Except for Somalia where data are lacking, the peer-reviewed scientific literature for the period 1990–2020 corroborate earlier reports with Glossina austeni detected in 6 countries; Eswatini, Kenya, Mozambique, South Africa, and the United Republic of Tanzania. In Zimbabwe the latest reports date back to 1992 from an area bordering Mozambique, but more recent surveys from the area did not confirm the presence of the species.
