= Glossina nigrofusca =

Scientific classification
- Kingdom: Animalia
- Phylum: Arthropoda
- Clade: Pancrustacea
- Class: Insecta
- Order: Diptera
- Family: Glossinidae
- Genus: Glossina
- Species: G. nigrofusca

Binomial name
- Glossina nigrofusca Newstead, 1911
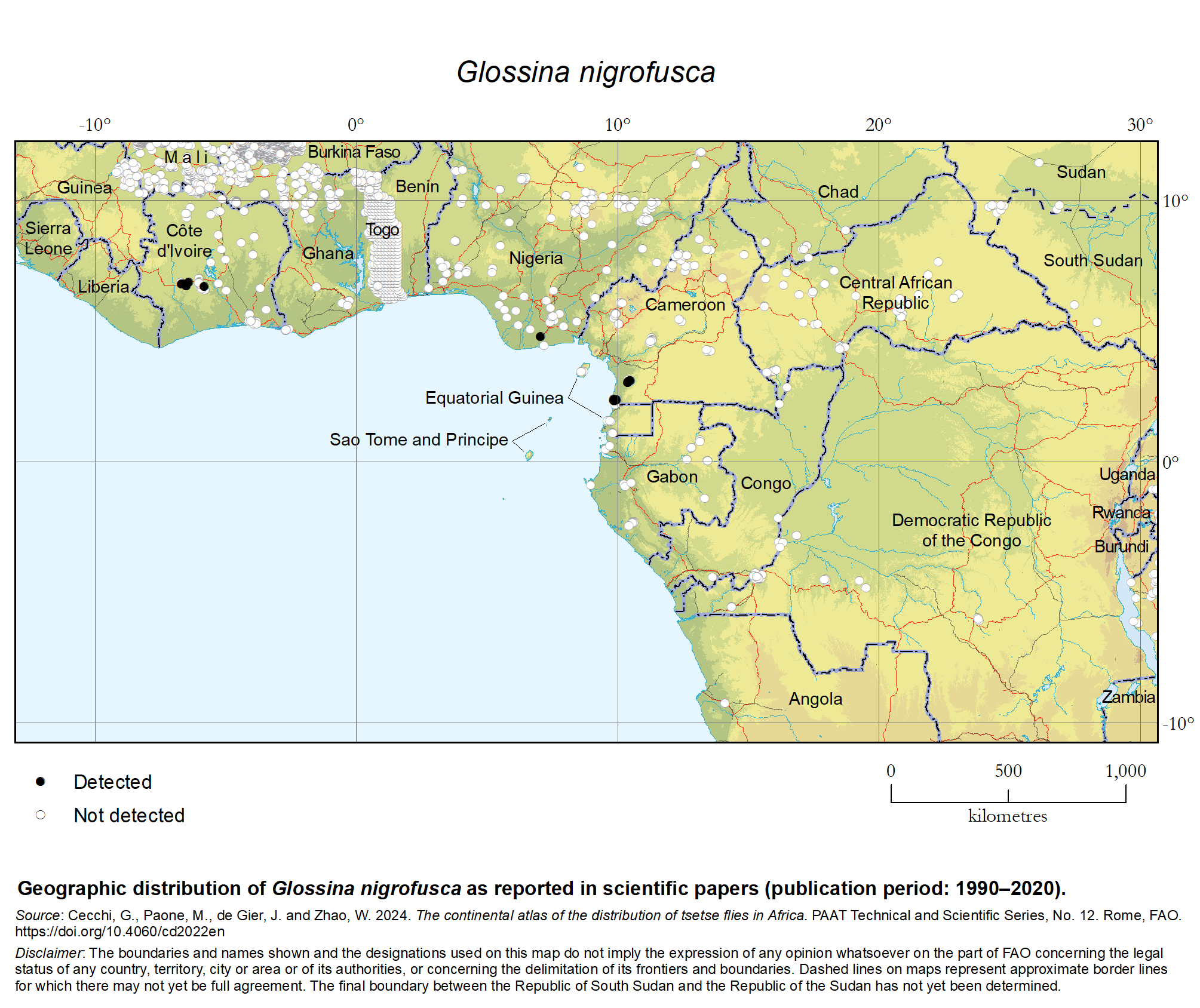
- Geographic distribution of Glossina nigrofusca as reported in scientific papers – Publication period 1990–2020

Species of tsetse fly

Glossina nigrofusca is one of the 23 recognized species of tsetse flies (genus Glossina), and it belongs to the forest/fusca group (subgenus Austenina).

== Taxonomy ==
Two subspecies of G. nigrofusca are recognized:

- Glossina nigrofusca nigrofusca (Newstead, 1911)
- Glossina nigrofusca hopkinsi (van Emden, 1944)

== Distribution ==
Glossina nigrofusca was historically reported in a narrow and fragmented belt in West Africa and Central Africa, from Sierra Leone in the West to Uganda in the East. However, a review of the scientific literature from 1990–2020 found confirmation of G. nigrofusca in only three countries; Côte d'Ivoire, Cameroon and Nigeria. In Cameroon, all published reports of G. nigrofusca for the period 1990–2020 originate from the sleeping sickness foci of Campo and Bipindi. The two subspecies of G. nigrofusca are generally believed to be geographically separated.

=== Glossina nigrofusca hopkinsi ===
Glossina nigrofusca hopkinsi occupies the eastern part of the species distribution, and it is generally considered to occur in eastern Democratic Republic of the Congo and Uganda. However, a review of the scientific literature from 1990–2020 did not find any explicit report of G. nigrofusca hopkinsi, nor any report of G. nigrofusca from the areas that were known or that may have been inhabited by this subspecies.

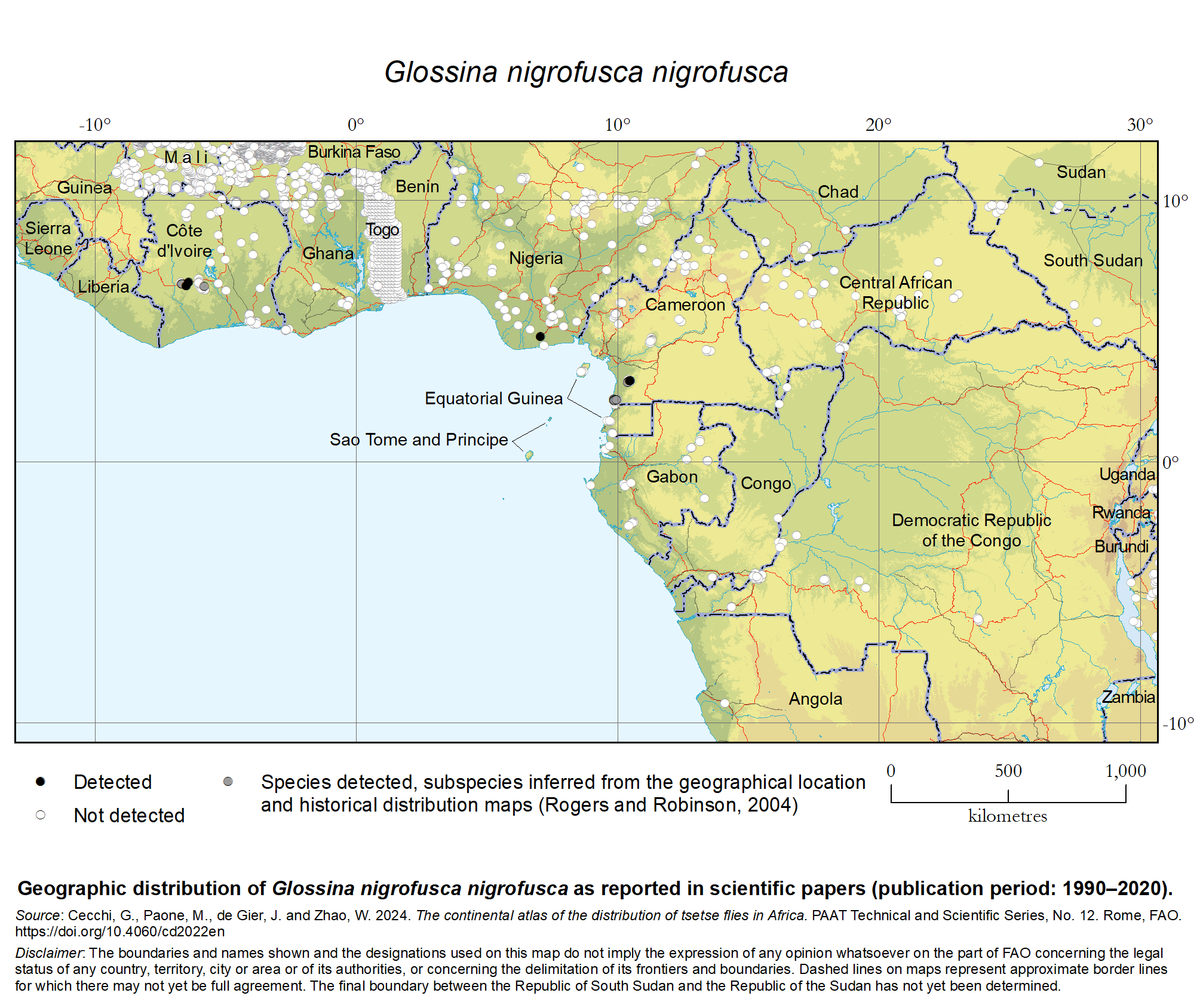
Geographic distribution of Glossina nigrofusca nigrofusca as reported in scientific papers – Publication period 1990–2020.

=== Glossina nigrofusca nigrofusca ===
Glossina nigrofusca nigrofusca occupies the western part of the distribution of G. nigrofusca, and it is generally considered to occur from Sierra Leone to the Central African Republic and western Democratic Republic of the Congo. However, a review of the scientific literature from 1990–2020 found explicit confirmation of G. nigrofusca nigrofusca in only three countries; Côte d'Ivoire, Cameroon, and Nigeria.
