= Glossina haningtoni =

Scientific classification
- Domain: Eukaryota
- Kingdom: Animalia
- Phylum: Arthropoda
- Class: Insecta
- Order: Diptera
- Family: Glossinidae
- Genus: Glossina
- Species: G. haningtoni

Binomial name
- Glossina haningtoni Newstead and Evans, 1922

Species of tsetse fly

Glossina haningtoni is one of the 23 recognized species of tsetse flies (genus Glossina), and it belongs to the forest/fusca group (subgenus Austenina).

== Distribution ==
Glossina haningtoni was historically reported from a relatively large and contiguous belt along the Atlantic Coast of Central Africa, centred in Gabon and extending to Angola, Cameroon, the Central African Republic, the Congo, the Democratic Republic of the Congo, Equatorial Guinea, Gabon and Nigeria. However, a review of the scientific literature from 1990 – 2020 found no record of G. haningtoni, despite a non-negligible trapping effort in several countries, and especially in Gabon.
