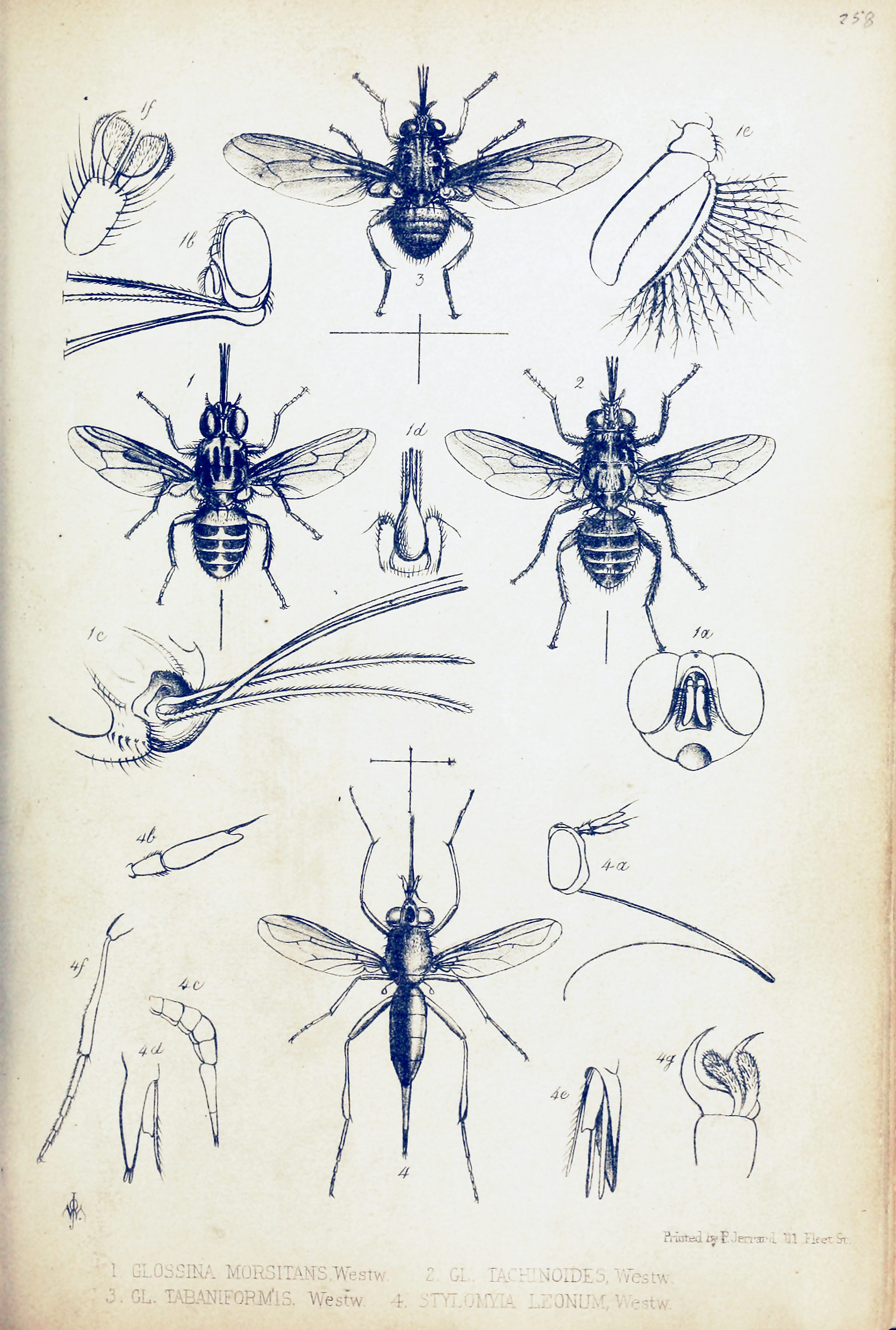
- 1a:head without haustellum from frontal, 1b: head from left lateral with palpi removed and haustellum separated, 1c: mouthparts from right lateral with palpi removed and haustellum separated, 1d: mouthparts from ventral, 1e: antenna, 1f: tip of tarsus

Scientific classification
- Domain: Eukaryota
- Kingdom: Animalia
- Phylum: Arthropoda
- Class: Insecta
- Order: Diptera
- Family: Glossinidae
- Genus: Glossina
- Species: G. tabaniformis

Binomial name
- Glossina tabaniformis Westwood, 1850
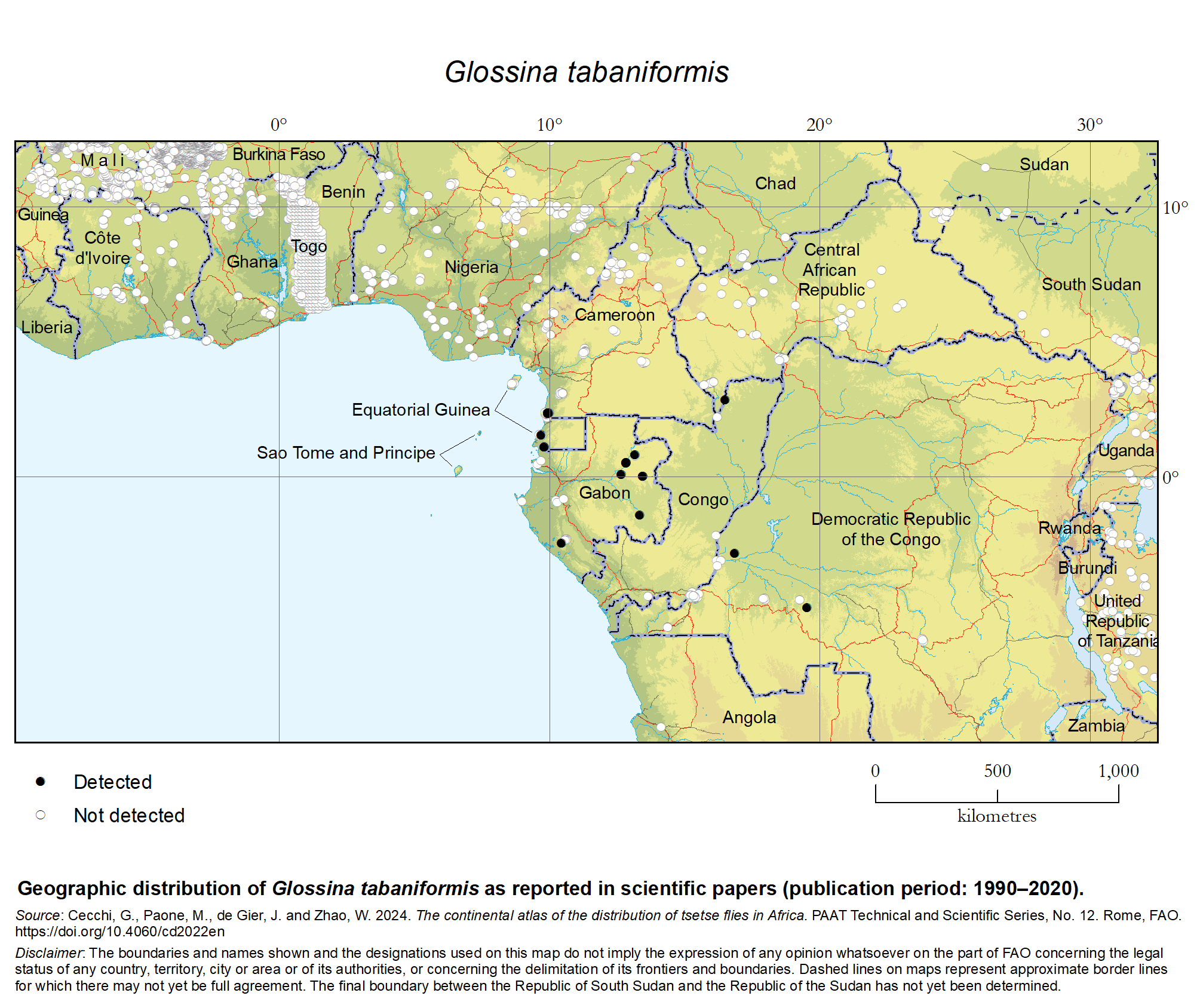
- Geographic distribution of Glossina tabaniformis as reported in scientific papers – Publication period 1990–2020

= Glossina tabaniformis =

Species of tsetse fly

Glossina tabaniformis is one of the 23 recognized species of tsetse flies (genus Glossina), and it belongs to the forest/fusca group (subgenus Austenina).

== Distribution ==
Glossina tabaniformis was historically reported from Central Africa, but with pockets extending also to West Africa as far as Liberia or Guinea. A review of the scientific literature from 1990 – 2020 only found confirmation of G. tabaniformis for five countries; Cameroon, the Central African Republic, the Democratic Republic of the Congo, Equatorial Guinea and Gabon. In addition to these five countries, prior records indicated that the species was also present in Angola, the Congo and Nigeria, and that it was or could still be present also in Côte d’Ivoire, Ghana and Guinea.
