= Glossina nashi =

Scientific classification
- Domain: Eukaryota
- Kingdom: Animalia
- Phylum: Arthropoda
- Class: Insecta
- Order: Diptera
- Family: Glossinidae
- Genus: Glossina
- Species: G. nashi

Binomial name
- Glossina nashi (Potts, 1955)
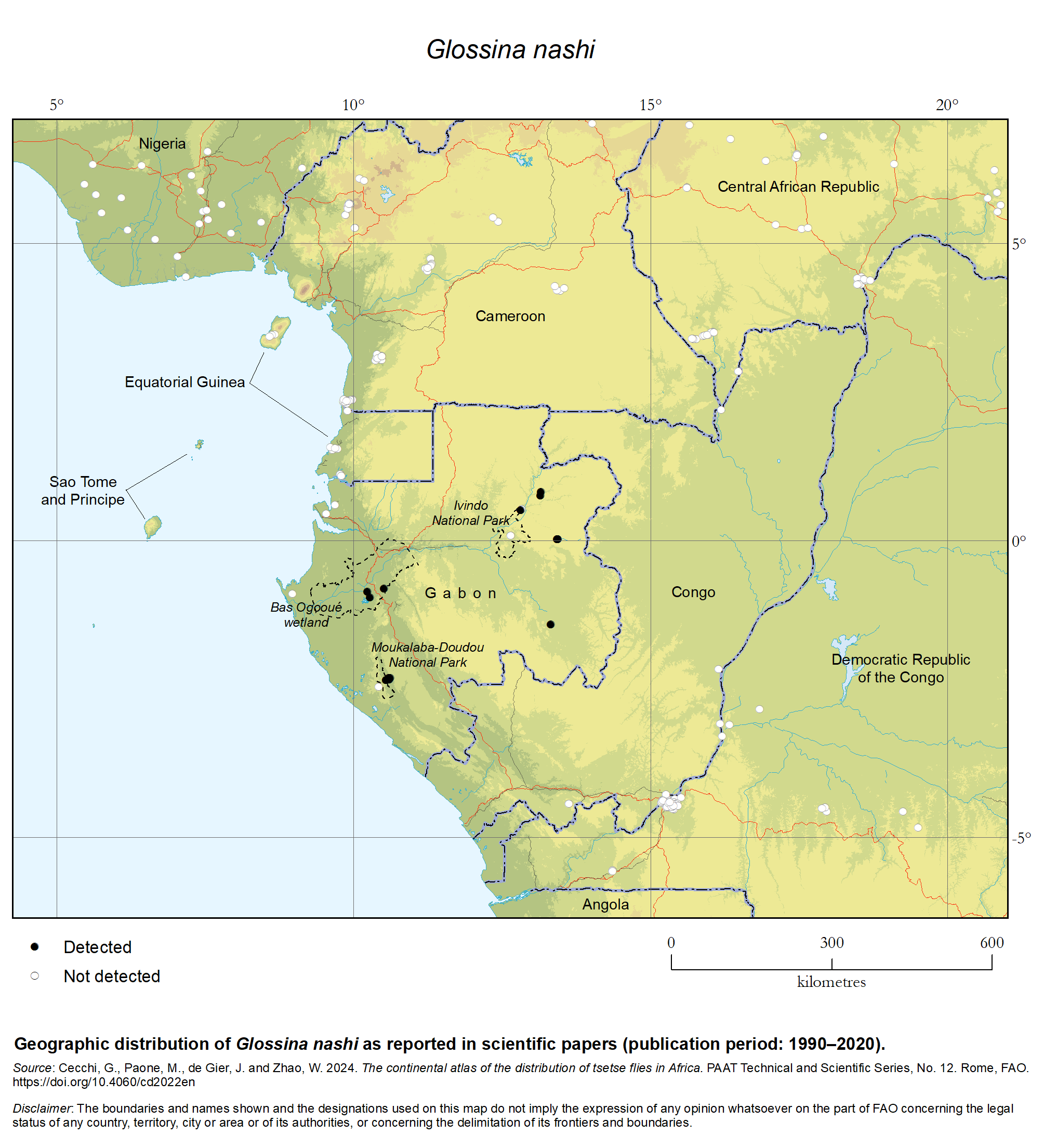
- Geographic distribution of Glossina nashi as reported in scientific papers – Publication period 1990–2020

Species of tsetse fly

Glossina nashi is one of the 23 recognized species of tsetse flies (genus Glossina), it belongs to the forest/fusca group (subgenus Austenina).

== Distribution ==
Glossina nashi was historically reported from a few countries in Central Africa, including Angola, Cameroon, the Central African Republic, the Congo, and Gabon. However, a review of the scientific literature from 1990–2020 only found confirmation of G. nashi for Gabon.
