= Glossina longipalpis =

Scientific classification
- Kingdom: Animalia
- Phylum: Arthropoda
- Clade: Pancrustacea
- Class: Insecta
- Order: Diptera
- Family: Glossinidae
- Genus: Glossina
- Species: G. longipalpis

Binomial name
- Glossina longipalpis Wiedemann, 1830
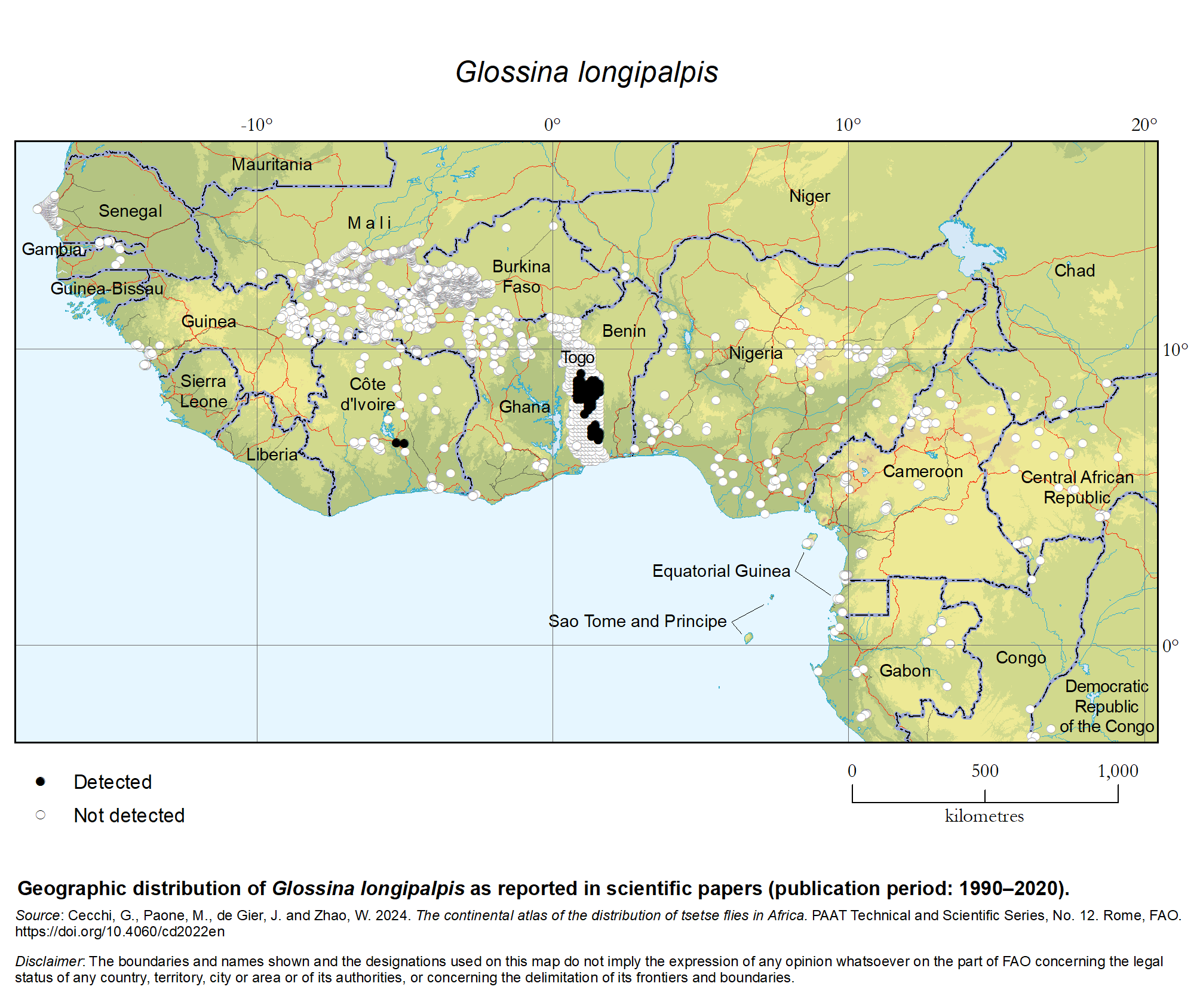
- Geographic distribution of Glossina longipalpis as reported in scientific papers – Publication period 1990–2020

Species of tsetse fly

Glossina longipalpis is one of the 23 recognized species of tsetse flies (genus Glossina), and it belongs to the savannah/morsitans group (subgenus Glossina s.s.). Glossina longipalpis can transmit African trypanosomiasis among livestock and wildlife, whilst it does not presently seem to play a role in the transmission of the human form of the disease.

== Distribution ==
Glossina longipalpis was known to occur in West Africa and Central Africa from Senegal to the Democratic Republic of the Congo. However, as of 1990, the accessible literature only provides reports of the species from 4 countries; Benin, Côte d'Ivoire, Nigeria, and Togo, with most reports dating back to the 1990s.
