= Glossina medicorum =

Scientific classification
- Kingdom: Animalia
- Phylum: Arthropoda
- Clade: Pancrustacea
- Class: Insecta
- Order: Diptera
- Family: Glossinidae
- Genus: Glossina
- Species: G. medicorum

Binomial name
- Glossina medicorum Austen, 1911
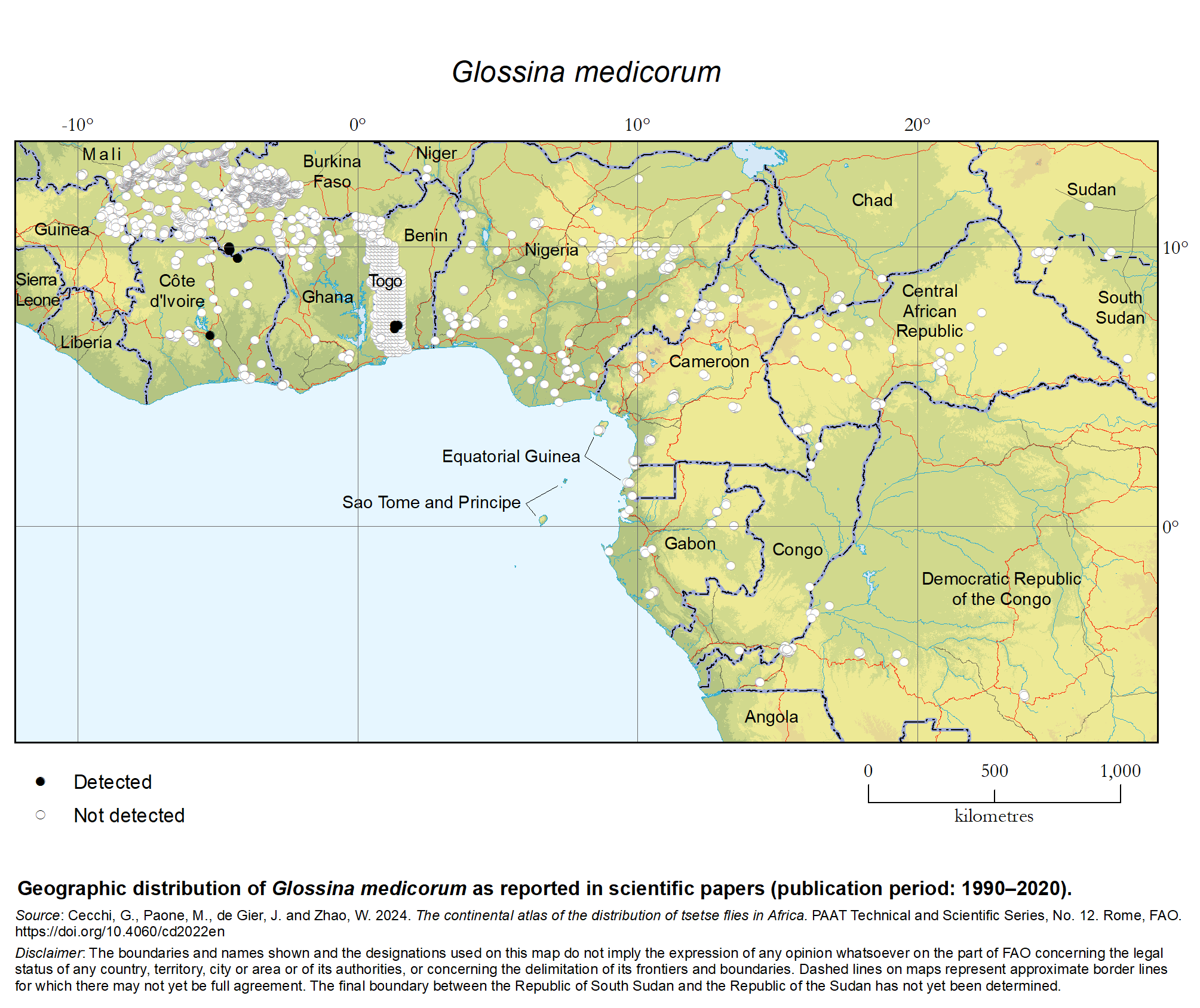
- Geographic distribution of Glossina medicorum as reported in scientific papers – Publication period 1990–2020

Species of tsetse fly

Glossina medicorum is one of the 23 recognized species of tsetse flies (genus Glossina), and it belongs to the forest/fusca group (subgenus Austenina).

== Distribution ==
Western Africa was historically known to be the main region of occurrence of Glossina medicorum, from Liberia in the West to Nigeria in the East, but the species was also reported or suggested from the Central African Republic, the Congo, the Democratic Republic of the Congo, Gabon, Sierra Leone and Uganda. However, a review of the scientific literature from 1990 – 2020 found confirmation of G. medicorum occurrence in only three countries: Burkina Faso, Côte d’Ivoire and Togo.
