= Glossina fuscipleuris =

Scientific classification
- Domain: Eukaryota
- Kingdom: Animalia
- Phylum: Arthropoda
- Class: Insecta
- Order: Diptera
- Family: Glossinidae
- Genus: Glossina
- Species: G. fuscipleuris

Binomial name
- Glossina fuscipleuris Austen, 1911
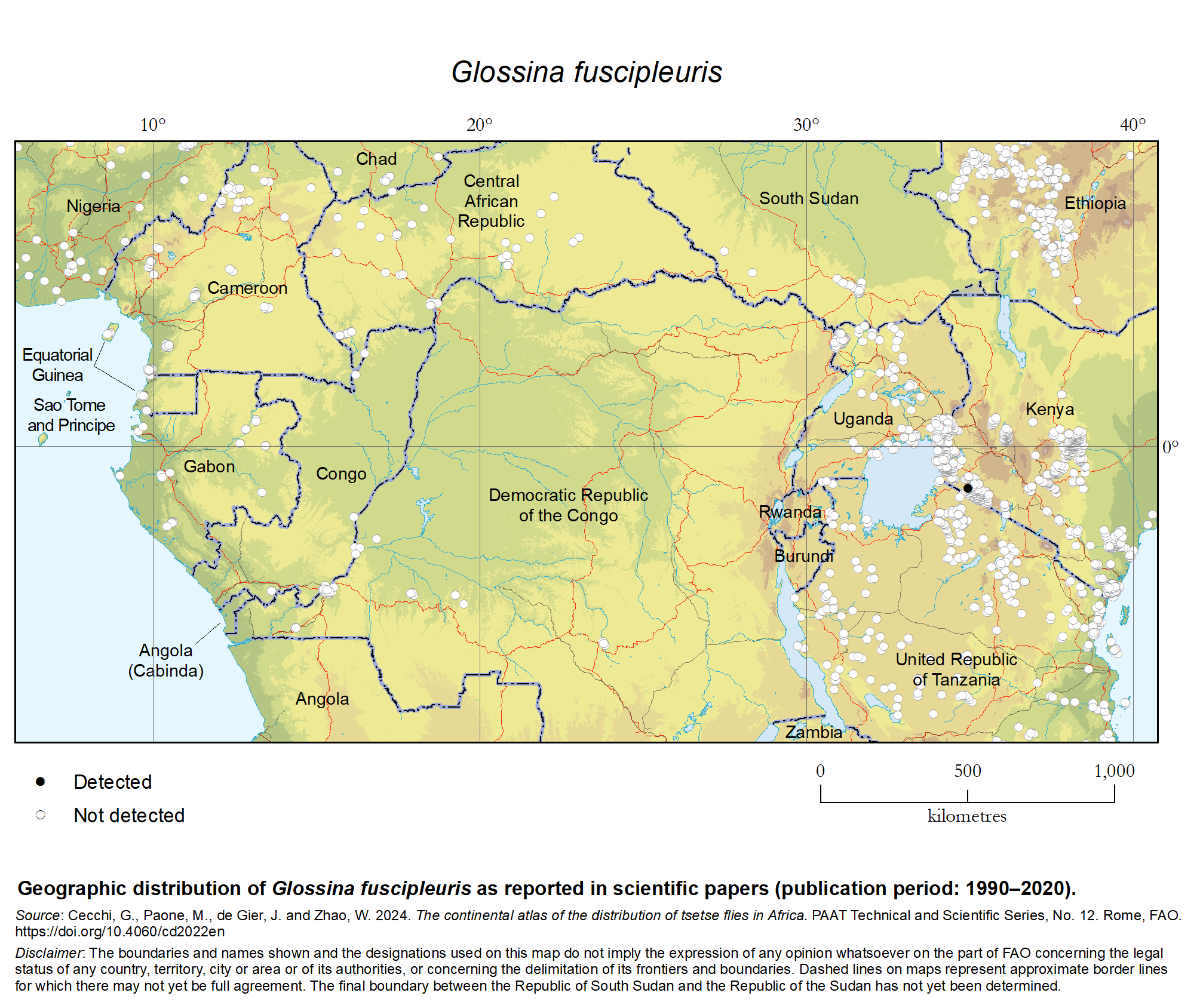
- Geographic distribution of Glossina fuscipleuris as reported in scientific papers – Publication period 1990–2020

Species of tsetse fly

Glossina fuscipleuris is one of the 23 recognized species of tsetse flies (genus Glossina), and it belongs to the forest/fusca group (subgenus Austenina).

== Distribution ==
Glossina fuscipleuris was historically known to occur in a fragmented belt in central Africa, and in particular at the northern and eastern fringes of the Congo basin. The countries where the species was historically recorded were Cameroon, the Central African Republic, the Democratic Republic of the Congo, Kenya, South Sudan, Uganda and the United Republic of Tanzania. However, a review of the scientific literature from 1990–2020 found confirmation of G. fuscipleuris occurrence only one country, Kenya.
