= Glossina brevipalpis =

Scientific classification
- Kingdom: Animalia
- Phylum: Arthropoda
- Clade: Pancrustacea
- Class: Insecta
- Order: Diptera
- Family: Glossinidae
- Genus: Glossina
- Species: G. brevipalpis

Binomial name
- Glossina brevipalpis Newstead, 1910
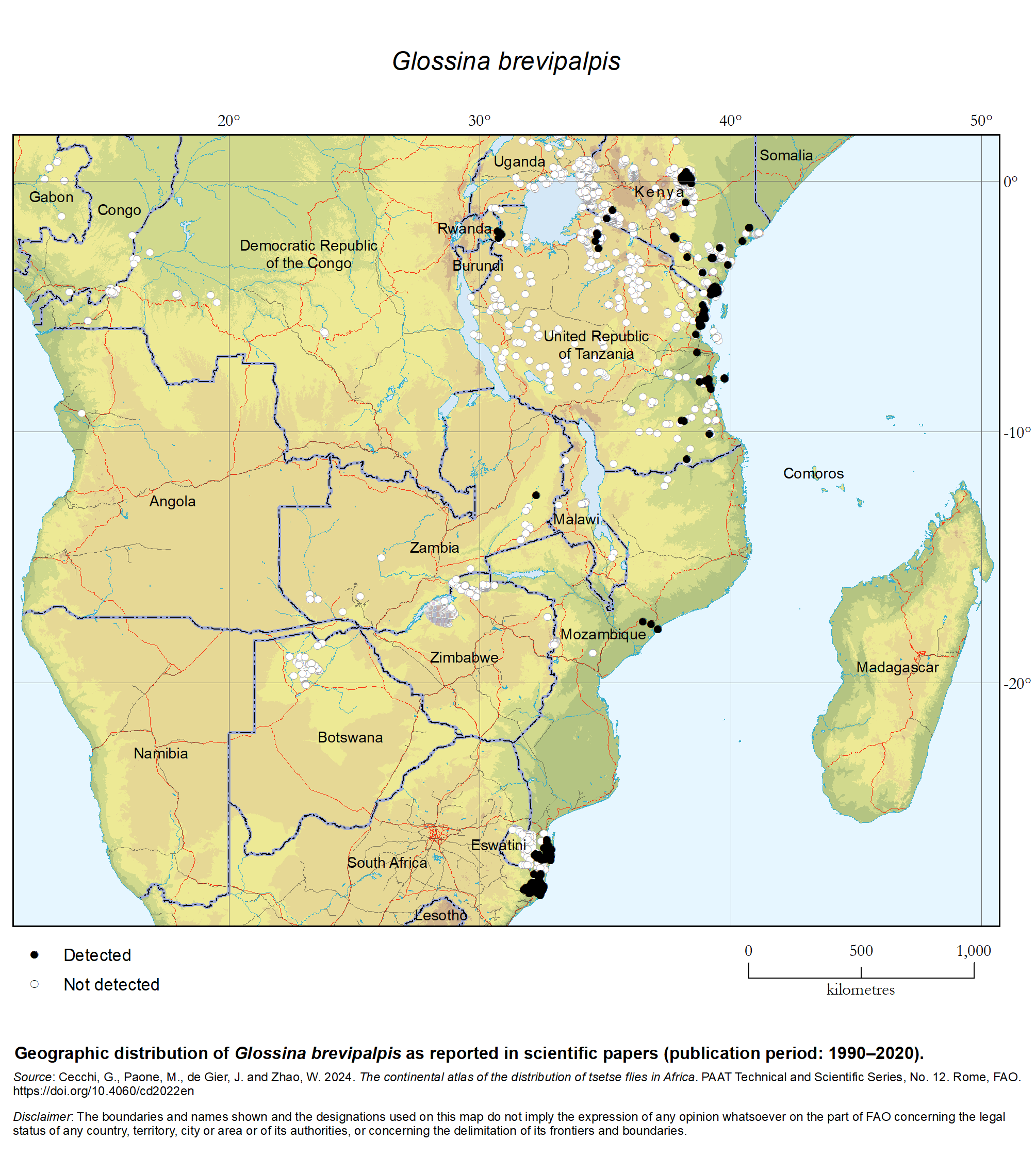
- Geographic distribution of Glossina brevipalpis as reported in scientific papers –Publication period 1990–2020

Species of tsetse fly

Glossina brevipalpis is one of the 23 recognized species of tsetse flies (genus Glossina), it belongs to the forest/fusca group (subgenus Austenina).

== Distribution ==
Glossina brevipalpis was known to be widely scattered in eastern Africa, from Somalia and Ethiopia in the North to South Africa in the South. A recent review of the scientific literature for the period 1990 – 2020 corroborated these earlier reports for 6 countries; Kenya, Mozambique, Rwanda, South Africa, the United Republic of Tanzania, and Zambia. Reports from other countries; the Democratic Republic of the Congo, Burundi, Ethiopia, Malawi, Somalia, Uganda and Zimbabwe, date back to periods before 1990.
