= Glossina vanhoofi =

Scientific classification
- Domain: Eukaryota
- Kingdom: Animalia
- Phylum: Arthropoda
- Class: Insecta
- Order: Diptera
- Family: Glossinidae
- Genus: Glossina
- Species: G. vanhoofi

Binomial name
- Glossina vanhoofi Henrard, 1952

Species of tsetse fly

Glossina vanhoofi is one of the 23 recognized species of tsetse flies (genus Glossina), and it belongs to the forest/fusca group (subgenus Austenina).

== Distribution ==
Glossina vanhoofi was historically reported only from the Democratic Republic of Congo. However, a review of the scientific literature from 1990–2020 found that no entomological survey was carried out in its historical distribution areas and so there is no recent published information on the geographic distribution of the species.
