= Glossina frezili =

Scientific classification
- Domain: Eukaryota
- Kingdom: Animalia
- Phylum: Arthropoda
- Class: Insecta
- Order: Diptera
- Family: Glossinidae
- Genus: Glossina
- Species: G. frezili

Binomial name
- Glossina frezili Gouteux, 1987
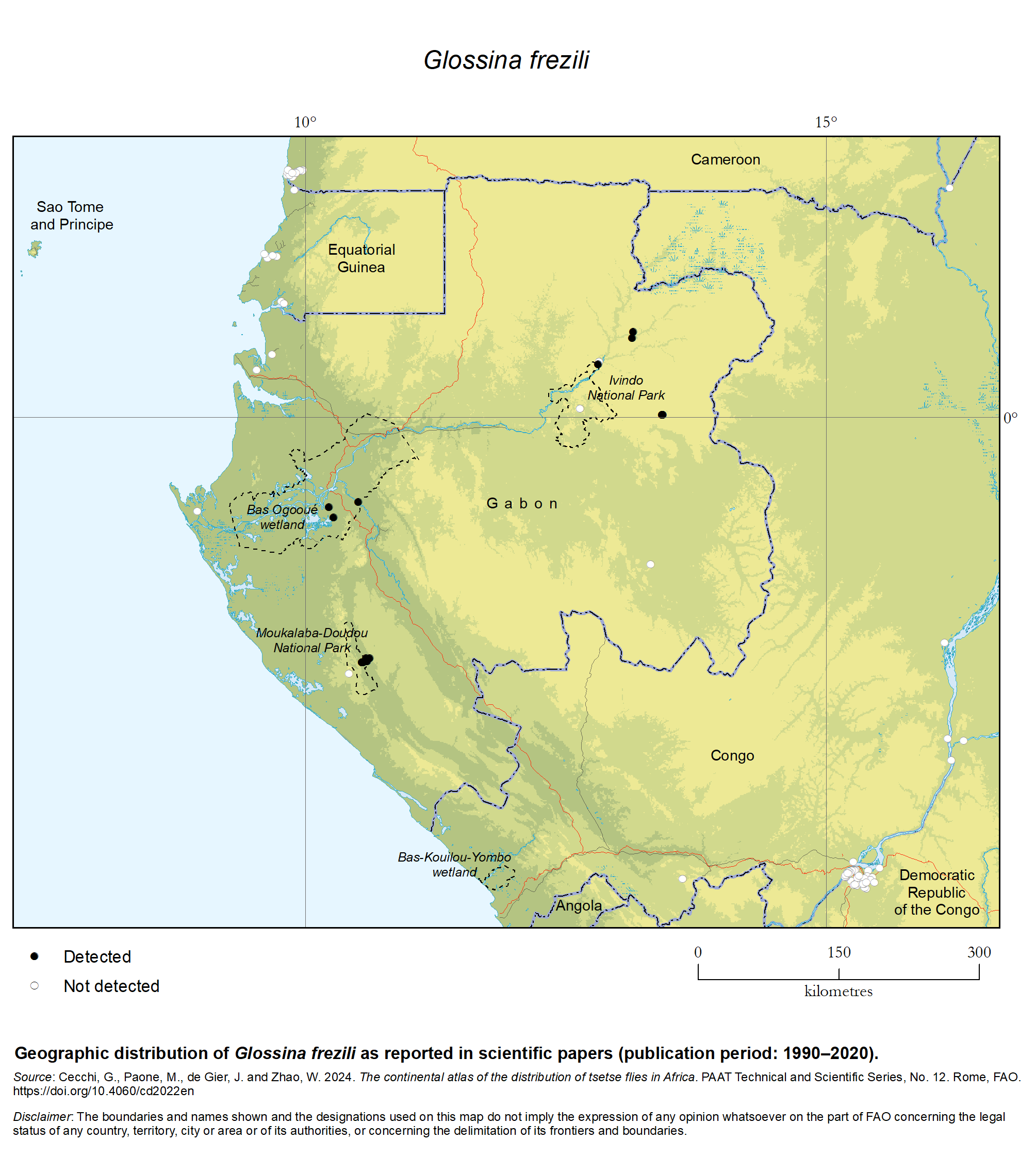
- Geographic distribution of Glossina frezili as reported in scientific papers – Publication period 1990–2020

Species of tsetse fly

Glossina frezili is one of the 23 recognized species of tsetse flies (genus Glossina), and it belongs to the forest/fusca group (subgenus Austenina).

== Distribution ==
Glossina frezili was the latest tsetse species to be identified, and it was first described in specimens from the Congo, and in particular from the mangroves at the estuary of the Kouilou-Niari river. Glossina frezili is also present in Gabon, and its presence had also been suggested in the Central African Republic and the Democratic Republic of the Congo. However, a review of the scientific literature for the period 1990 – 2020 only found published evidence of its presence in Gabon, and in particular from the Ivindo National Park, the Moukalaba-Doudou National Park, and other forested or wetland areas. By contrast, no recent data is available from the coastal area of Congo where the species was first described, which falls within the wetland of international importance Bas-Kouilou-Yombo.
