= Glossina tachinoides =

Scientific classification
- Kingdom: Animalia
- Phylum: Arthropoda
- Clade: Pancrustacea
- Class: Insecta
- Order: Diptera
- Family: Glossinidae
- Genus: Glossina
- Species: G. tachinoides

Binomial name
- Glossina tachinoides Westwood, 1850
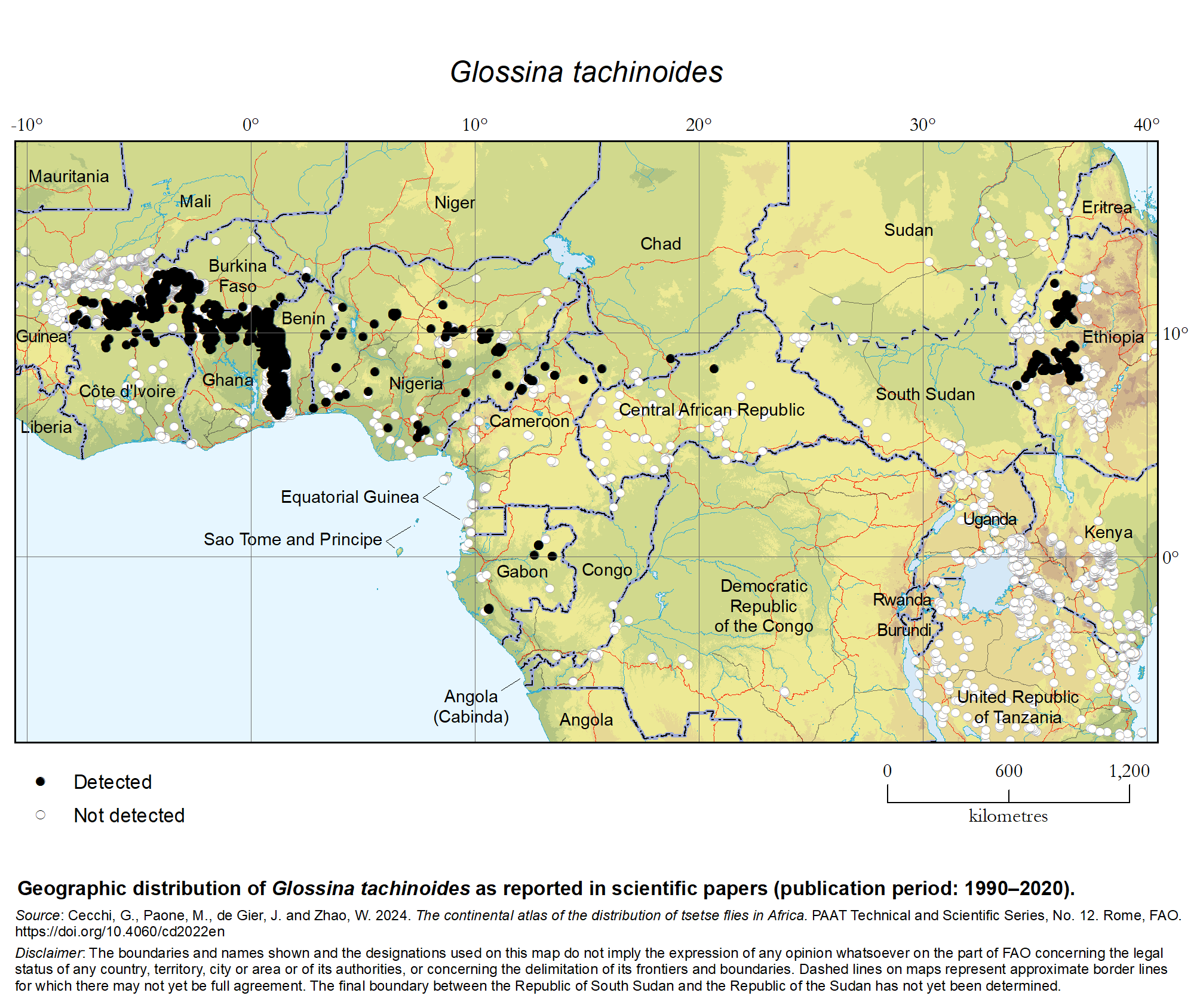
- Geographic distribution of Glossina tachinoides as reported in scientific papers – Publication period 1990–2020

Species of tsetse fly

Glossina tachinoides is one of the 23 recognized species of tsetse flies (genus Glossina), and it belongs to the riverine/palpalis group (subgenus Nemorhina). Glossina tachinoides can transmit African trypanosomiasis, including both the form affecting livestock and the one affecting humans.

== Distribution ==
Glossina tachinoides was known to occur in a broad belt in western Africa and central Africa, from Guinea in the West to the Central African Republic in the East, with a separate population further to the East in western Ethiopia.

Data on the occurrence of G. tachinoides in the peer-reviewed scientific literature for the period 1990–2020 is available for 13 countries. These countries are Benin, Burkina Faso, Cameroon, the Central African Republic, Chad, Côte d'Ivoire, Ethiopia, Gabon, Ghana, Mali, Niger, Nigeria, and Togo, while reports from Guinea, Sudan and present-day South Sudan date back to earlier periods.
