= Glossina fusca =

Scientific classification
- Kingdom: Animalia
- Phylum: Arthropoda
- Clade: Pancrustacea
- Class: Insecta
- Order: Diptera
- Family: Glossinidae
- Genus: Glossina
- Species: G. fusca

Binomial name
- Glossina fusca (Walker, 1849)

Subspecies
- See text.
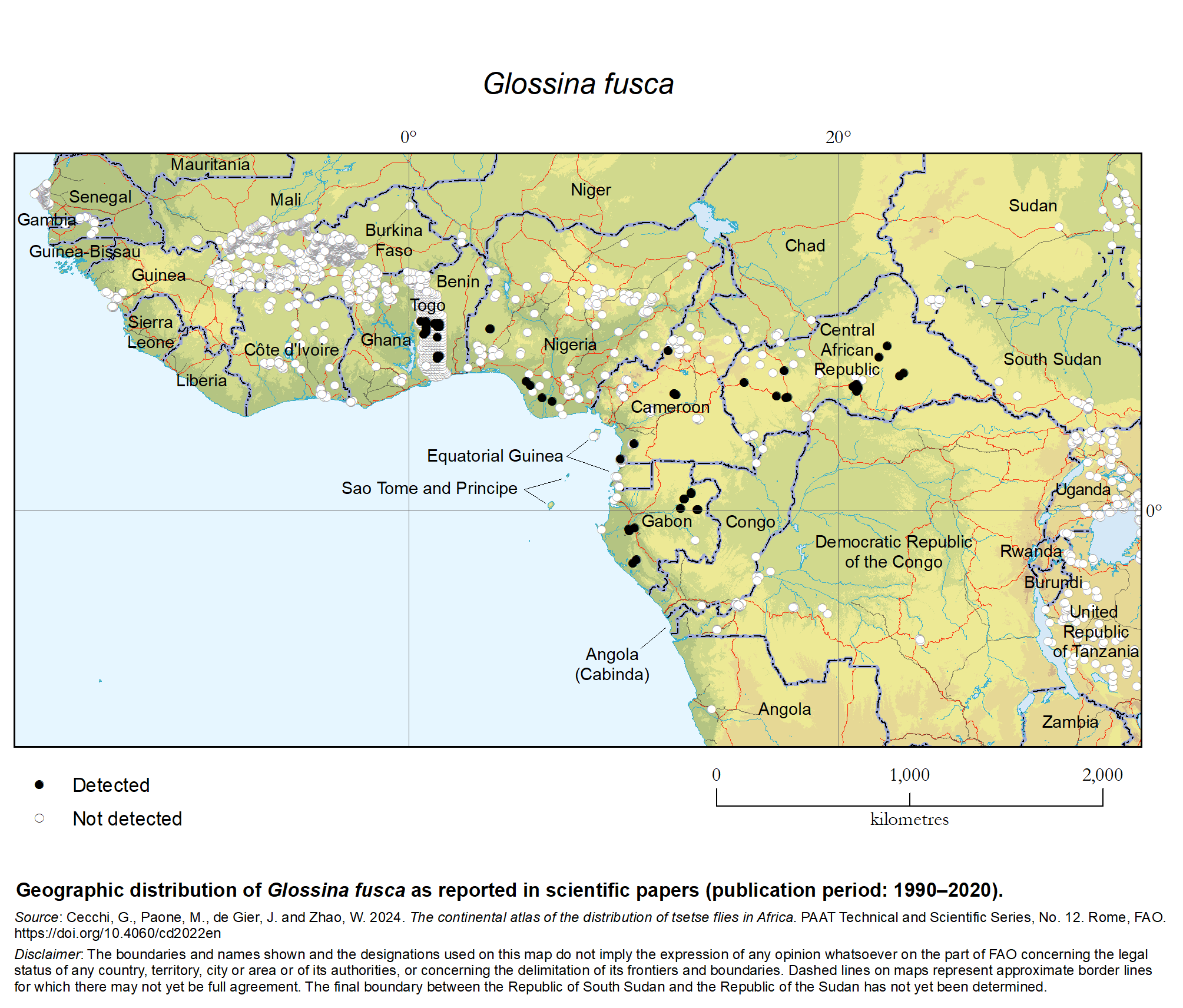
- Geographic distribution of Glossina fusca as reported in scientific papers – Publication period 1990–2020

Synonyms
- Stomoxys fuscus Walker, 1849

Species of tsetse fly

Glossina fusca is one of the 23 recognized species of tsetse flies (genus Glossina), and it belongs to the forest/fusca group (subgenus Austenina).

== Taxonomy ==
Glossina fusca was first described in 1849 as Stomoxys fuscus. It is placed in the forest/fusca group (subgenus Austenina). Two subspecies of G. fusca are recognized:

- Glossina fusca fusca (Walker, 1849)
- Glossina fusca congolensis (Newstead & Evans, 1921)

== Range and habitat ==
Historically, G. fusca was considered to occur in a wide area of tropical Africa, from Guinea-Bissau to Uganda. A 2024 review found that between 1990 and 2020 the species only had confirmed occurrences in five countries: Cameroon, the Central African Republic, Gabon, Nigeria, and Togo. In 2026 the species was also confirmed in Côte d'Ivoire. The prime habitat of G. fusca is rainforest edges, but it also occurs within rainforest, in isolated areas of forest in savannah, and along the edges of rivers.

The subspecies G. fusca fusca has been recorded in the western part of the main species range, while G. fusca congolensis has been recorded in the eastern part. The transition between the two subspecies, is generally considered to be between Ghana, Togo and Benin but is less clearly identified. Some authors may have overlooked the overlap of G. fusca fusca and G. fusca congolensis in Cameroon.

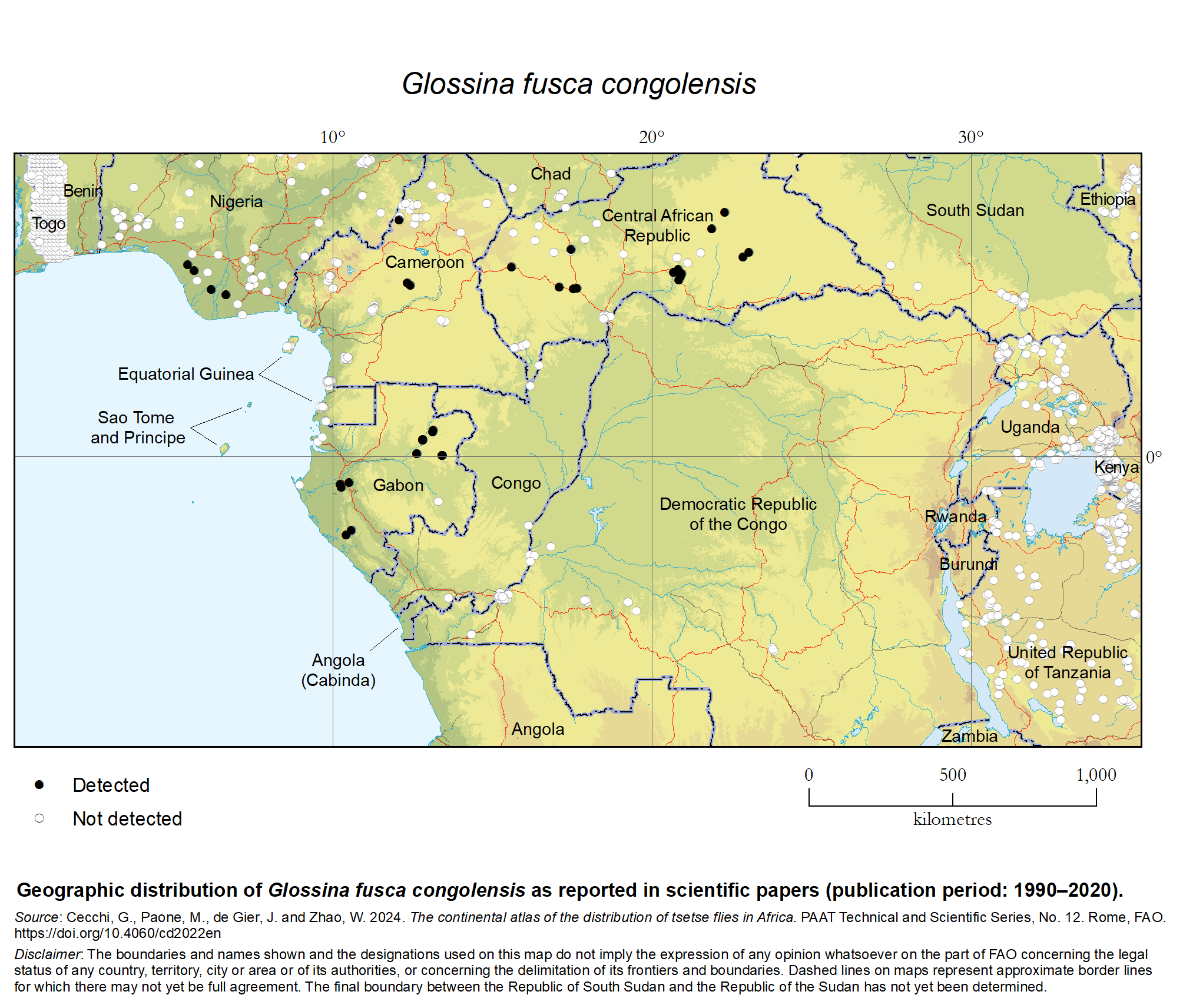
Geographic distribution of Glossina fusca congolensis as reported in scientific papers–Publication period 1990–2020

=== Glossina fusca congolensis ===
Glossina fusca congolensis mainly occupies the eastern part of the geographical range of Glossina fusca, from Nigeria to the Central African Republic, even though, since its distribution overlaps in some areas with that of Glossina fusca fusca, the main transition area between the two subspecies is not well delineated. In a review of the scientific literature from 1990 to 2020, G. fusca congolensis was reported from four countries; Cameroon, the Central African Republic, Gabon and Nigeria.

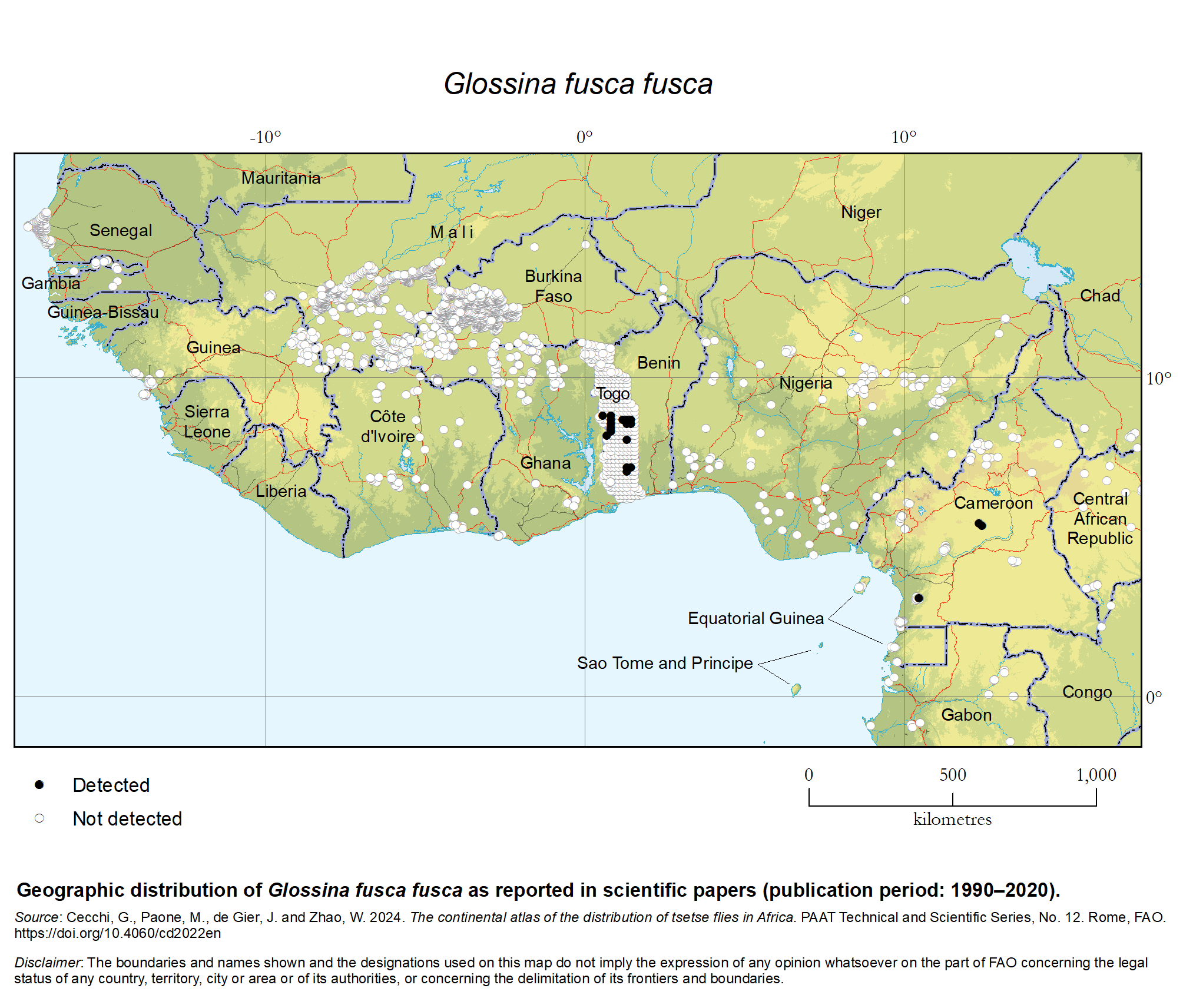
Geographic distribution of Glossina fusca fusca as reported in scientific papers – Publication period 1990–2020

=== Glossina fusca fusca ===
Glossina fusca fusca mainly occupies the western part of the geographical range of Glossina fusca, from Guinea-Bissau to Cameroon, even though, since its distribution overlaps in some areas with that of Glossina fusca congolensis, the main transition area between the two subspecies is not well delineated. In a review of the scientific literature from 1990 to 2020, G. fusca fusca was only reported from two countries: Cameroon, and Togo, and subsequently also confirmed in Côte d'Ivoire.

== Bibliography ==
- Cecchi, G.; Paone, M.; de Gier, J. & Zhao, W. (2024). The continental atlas of the distribution of tsetse flies in Africa. PAAT Technical and Scientific Series, No. 12. Rome: FAO. doi:10.4060/cd2022en. ISBN 978-92-5-139040-5.
