= Robert Newstead =

British entomologist (1859–1947)

Portrait by Walter Stoneman, 1917

Robert Newstead (11 September 1859 – 17 February 1947) was a British entomologist, naturalist, and archaeologist. He taught himself entomology, wrote a monograph on the scale insects and later served as a professor of medical entomology at the Liverpool School of Tropical Medicine.

Newstead was born in Swanton Abbott, Norfolk where his father worked as a butler to Boulton of Oulton Hall. His father later became a gardener at Sedgeford and young Newstead was introduced early to the world of plants and natural history. Newstead went to school but quit at the age of ten to work as a gardener, followed by work in a press, and as a telegraphist. He returned to gardening in 1883 for Osten Walker, an amateur naturalist. Walker paid for his studies and encouraged him to work at the newly founded Grosvenor Museum, Chester as a curator. He also encouraged Newstead to study the scale insects which built his repute as an entomologist. He was then given a grant to collect Coccidae from around Britain. For some time, Newstead worked as an assistant to Eleanor Ormerod, helping her compile lists of injurious insects for her annual reports. In 1905 he became a lecturer in medical entomology at the Liverpool School of Tropical Medicine and in 1911 he held the Dutton Chair of Entomology at Liverpool. During World War I, he was involved in insect control on the front in France and Flanders. Newstead also took an interest in archaeology, especially working on the digs to examine the Roman remains in Chester between 1926 and 1929. He served as Chester City Magistrate from 1913 to 1946.
