= Parasitic flies of domestic animals =

Overview of parasite-transmitting flies

Many species of flies of the two-winged type, order Diptera, such as mosquitoes, horseflies, blowflies, and warbleflies, cause direct parasitic disease to domestic animals, and transmit organisms that cause diseases. These infestations and infections cause distress to companion animals, and in livestock industry the financial costs of these diseases are high. These problems occur wherever domestic animals are reared. This article provides an overview of parasitic flies from a veterinary perspective, with emphasis on the disease-causing relationships between these flies and their host animals. The article is organized following the taxonomic hierarchy of these flies in the phylum Arthropoda, order Insecta. Families and genera of dipteran flies are emphasized rather than many individual species. Disease caused by the feeding activity of the flies is described here under parasitic disease. Disease caused by small pathogenic organisms that pass from the flies to domestic animals is described here under transmitted organisms; prominent examples are provided from the many species.

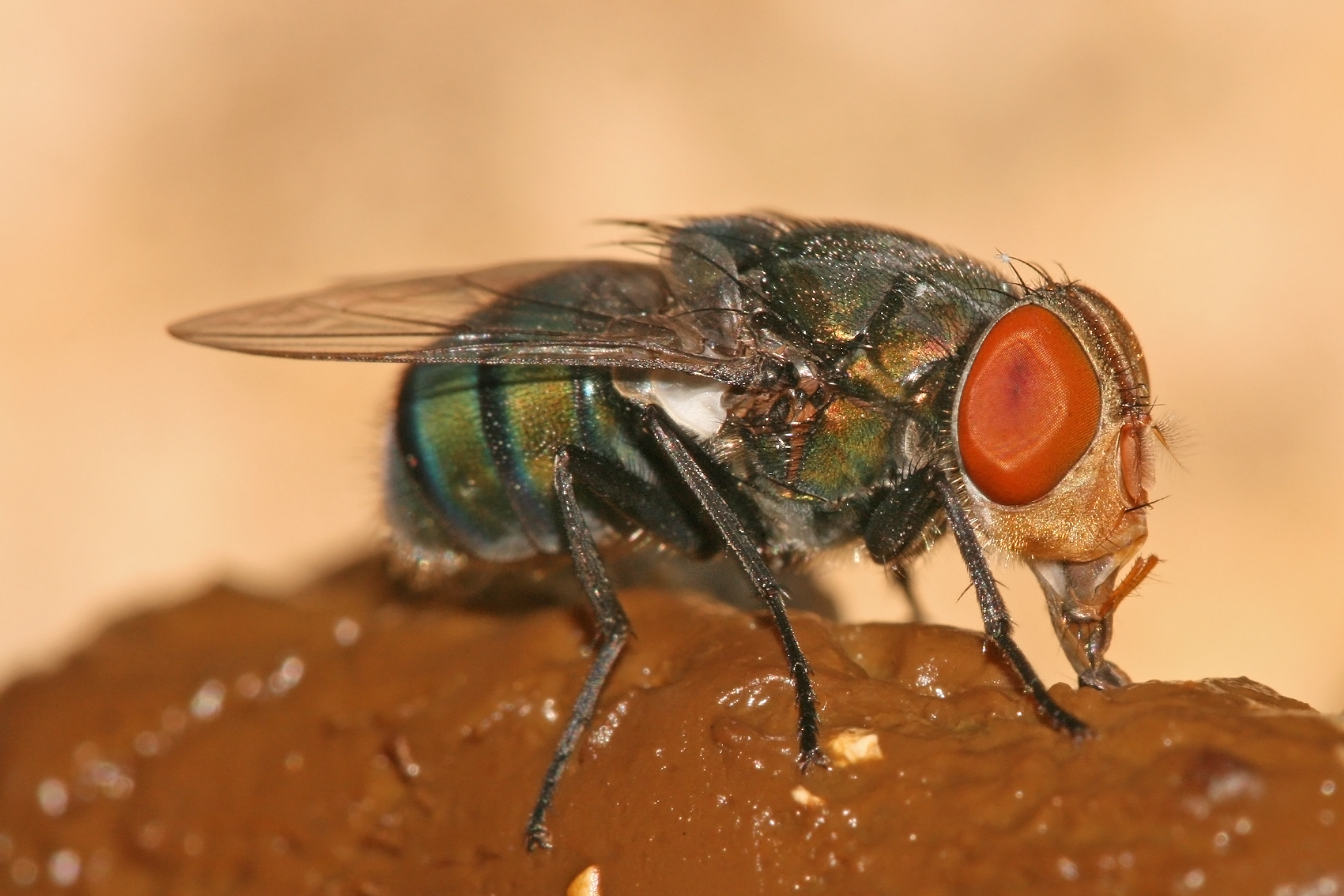
Adult Chrysomya megacephala blowfly, known as bazaar fly, feeding by sponging at organic waste from where it may transmit harmful bacteria

== Summary of types of disease associated with types of dipteran flies ==
Disease caused by the feeding activity of dipteran flies is described here under parasitic disease. Disease caused by small pathogenic organisms that pass from the flies to domestic animals is described here under transmitted organisms; these organisms are often of numerous species thus only prominent examples are provided. Feeding by adult flies may cause irritation through acute stress from painful bites, resulting in loss of grazing time and reduced gain in weight. Feeding by adult flies on the blood of their hosts exposes the hosts to pathogenic organisms that are infecting the fly, this can lead to acute disease of the host's blood and other organs. Feeding by adult flies using their sponging mouthparts can also expose the hosts to pathogenic organisms that have contaminated the mouthparts. Larvae of some flies are adapted to feed on the tissues of their host, causing direct pathological damage to organs; this is known as myiasis.

=== Outline classification (families of main veterinary importance) ===
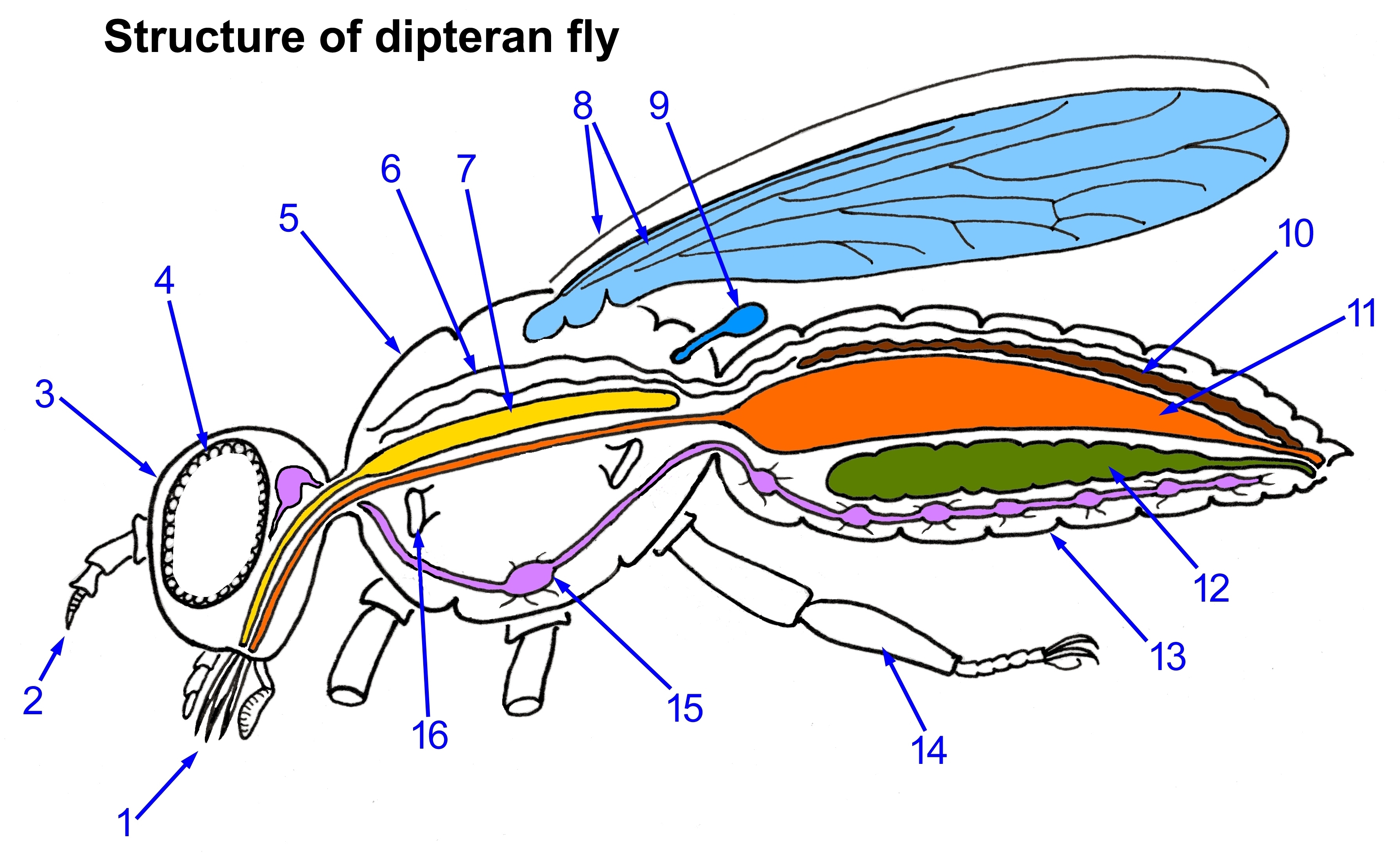
1-Complex mouthparts, 2-Paired antennae, 3-Head, 4-Compound eye, 5-Thorax, 6-Open tube heart, 7-Salivary gland, 8-One pair of wings, 9-Halter, 10-Excretory (Malpighian) tube, 11-Gut, 12-Ovary (or testis), 13-Abdomen, 14-Legs (3 pairs), 15-Thoracic ganglion of nervous system, 16-Spiracle opening to respiratory tube (trachea)

Class Insecta

Order Diptera (two-winged flies)

suborder Nematocera

Family Culicidae (mosquitoes)
Family Ceratopogonidae (biting midges)
Family Psychodidae (sandflies)
Family Simuliidae (blackflies)

suborder Brachycera

Family Tabanidae (horseflies)
Family Muscidae (houseflies and others)
Family Glossinidae (tsetse flies)
Family Calliphoridae (blowflies)
Family Oestridae (botflies and others)
Family Hippoboscidae (louseflies)

(Note that the former suborder Cyclorrhapha is now usually classified as part of the Brachycera.)

== Nematocera (suborder) ==
=== General characteristics ===
Antennae are usually long, with many similar and symmetric segments. These are small to very small flies, usually of delicate morphology with relatively long legs and wings. Body and wings are often covered in fine scales. Thorax is distinctly humped, abdomen is elongated. All species of veterinary and medical importance are blood feeders, with various types of mouthparts (these variations do not relate clearly to dipteran taxonomy).

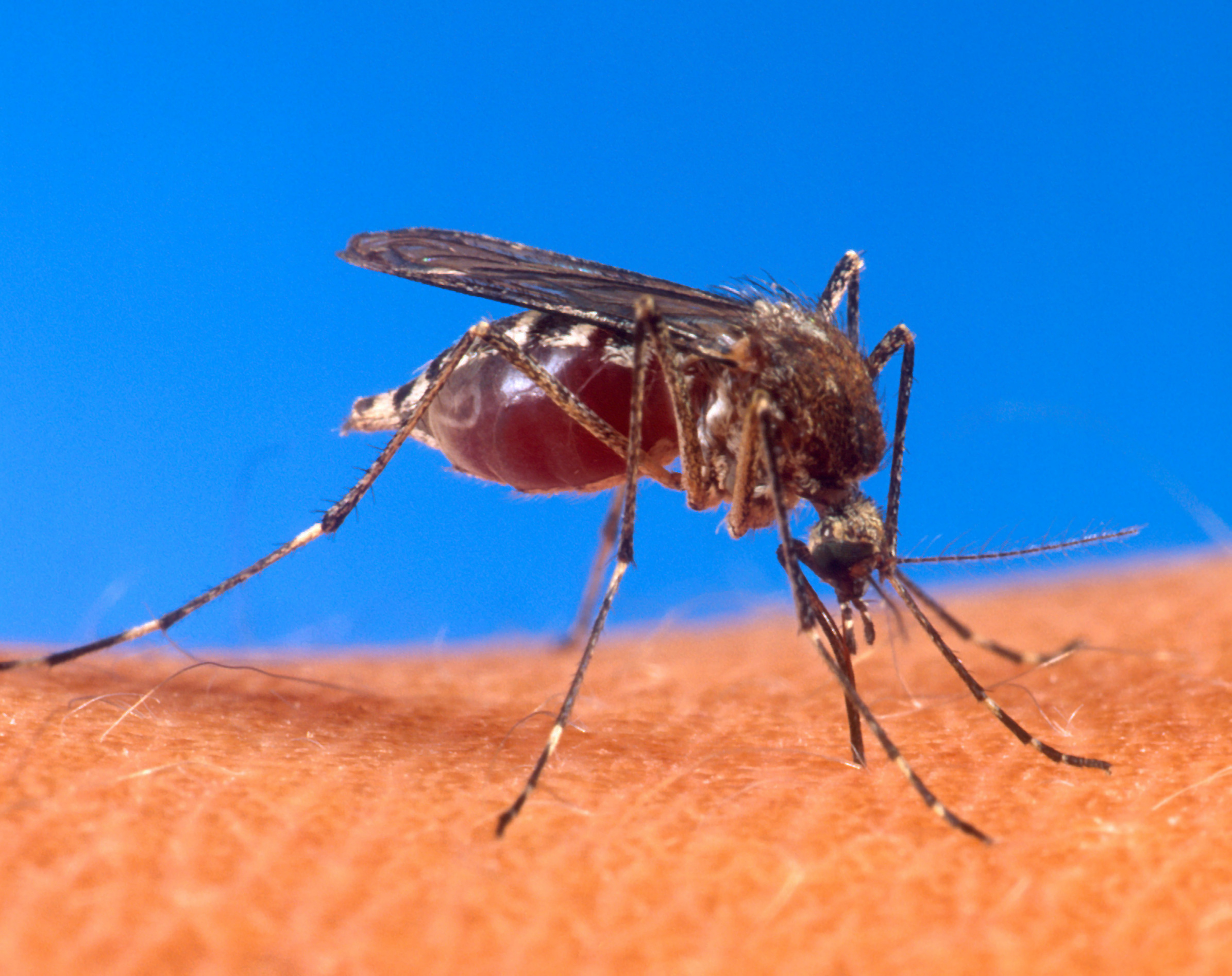
Aedes aegypti female mosquito engorging with blood.

Lifecycle is a complete metamorphosis with larvae that are parasitic, living in environments such as pools of water, soil, and streams. A complete metamorphosis is illustrated by the photograph of Stomoxys eggs, larvae, and adult (Stomoxys are in suborder Brachycera). Only females feed on blood, taking a large meal to support production of several hundred eggs, followed by several more cycles of blood meal followed by egg laying. Males feed on plant nectar and similar sources of sugars.

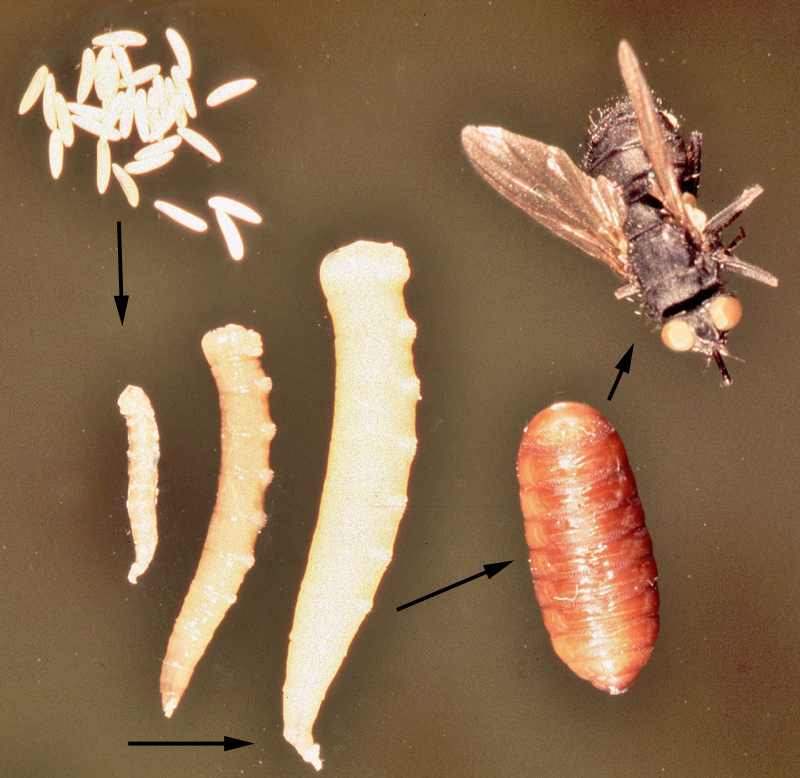
Lifecycle of Stomoxys showing a typical complete metamorphosis from eggs at top left, to three larval stages, followed by transformation as the pupal stage into an adult female or male

=== Disease relations ===
Nematocerans are very important as transmitters of viruses, protozoa, and nematode worms. Also, they are often important for biting stress when in large numbers, and may cause allergic reactions at their feeding sites. A typical pathway of transmission of organisms by blood-feeding flies is shown below as a virus transmitted by an adult fly that feeds repeatedly on several hosts (see diagram for Biological transmission, and photograph of Culicoides). Insects that transmit pathogenic organisms are commonly known as vectors. The diagram shows what is known as biological transmission (= developmental transmission) because it is necessary for the transmitted organism to develop in the fly to the state where the organism is at an infective stage of its lifecycle. The repeated cycles of egg laying and feeding of the female fly (= gonotrophic cycle) provides the opportunity for the transmitted organisms to develop, multiply, and be exposed to further vertebrate hosts where they can complete their lifecycle. Only the adult flies are involved in this biological transmission, in contrast to biological transmission by other arthropods such as lice or ticks in which all active stages of the lifecycle feed on blood.

=== Mosquitoes (family Culicidae) ===
Typical genera are Culex, Aedes, and Anopheles

==== Morphology, lifecycle, hosts, and feeding ====
The basic structure of dipteran flies is illustrated in the diagram. Veterinary parasitology also covers arthropods in the class Acari, the ticks of domestic animals, and mites of livestock, which have distinctly different structure from arthropods in the class Insecta. However, flies in the order Diptera show clear division of the body into head, thorax, and abdomen with distinct segmentation of the thorax and abdomen. The thorax contains large blocks of muscle that power the single pair of wings. Digestive and reproductive organs fill the abdomen. Also unique to the Diptera is a pair of halteres (derived from wings during evolution) that aid agile flight by these flies. Mosquitoes have veined and scaled wings, long legs, and long hypodermic mouthparts sheathed in a protective labium (see photograph of Aedes female engorged with blood). Adult females lay eggs in batches on surfaces of stagnant water. Larvae feed on microorganisms and organic detritus in water. Pupation occurs at the surface of the water. Feeding by females is on a wide variety of mammals and birds, whilst males feed on plant sugars.

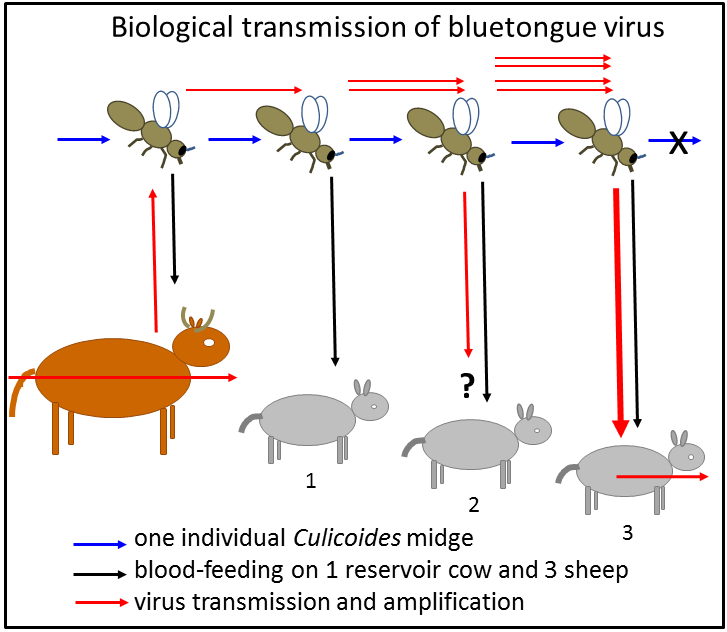
Transmission pathways of biological transmission of bluetongue virus by Culicoides female midge feeding first on a reservoir cow, then on three susceptible sheep

==== Parasitic diseases and transmitted organisms ====
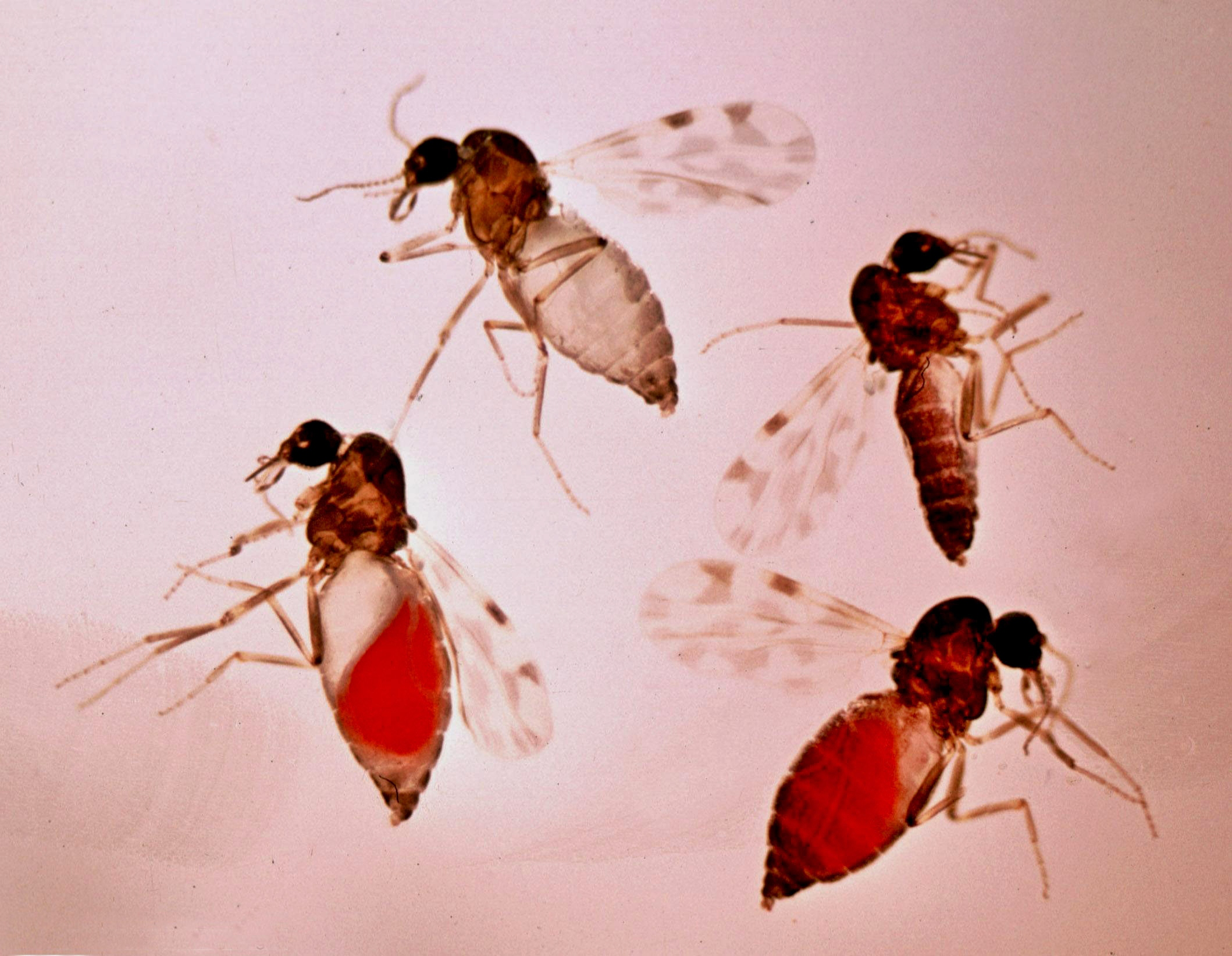
Culicoides imicola stages of gonotrophic and transmission cycle: top left = unfed female, unable to transmit; bottom left = first blood-meal, may become infected; top right = female after laying an egg batch, ready to feed again; bottom right = a further blood meal that could have involved transmission of pathogenic organism.

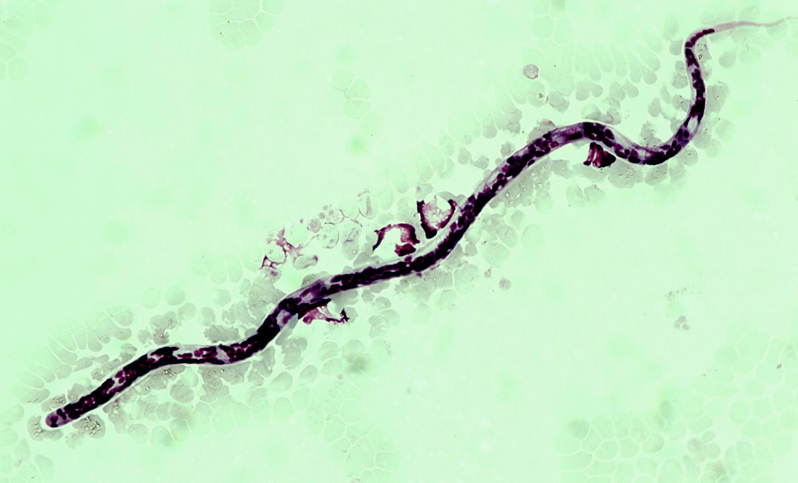
Microfilaria stage of Dirofilaria immitis, heartworm, in blood of a dog (for scale the grey discs are stained red blood cells)

Biting stress can be severe in varied climatic regions (cold northern or tropics) or conditions of much surface water available for breeding where populations of mosquitoes can become dense. Species of genera Aedes, Anopheles and Psorophora transmit equine encephalitis viruses to horses. Culex, Aedes, and Anopheles species of mosquitoes transmit Plasmodium protozoa that cause types of malaria in birds. Culex mosquitoes transmit West Nile virus between birds and horses; they transmit Rift Valley fever virus to livestock species and humans. The nematode worm Dirofilaria immitis that causes heartworm disease in dogs is transmitted by species of Culex and Aedes. See photograph of microfilaria stage of Dirofilaria immitus in blood of dog; adult worms in dog's heart grow to several centimeters long. (Mosquitoes are of major importance as transmitters of many types of pathogenic microorganisms to humans causing diseases such as malaria and yellow fever. Plasmodium species causing malaria in humans are exclusively transmitted by Anopheles mosquitoes.)

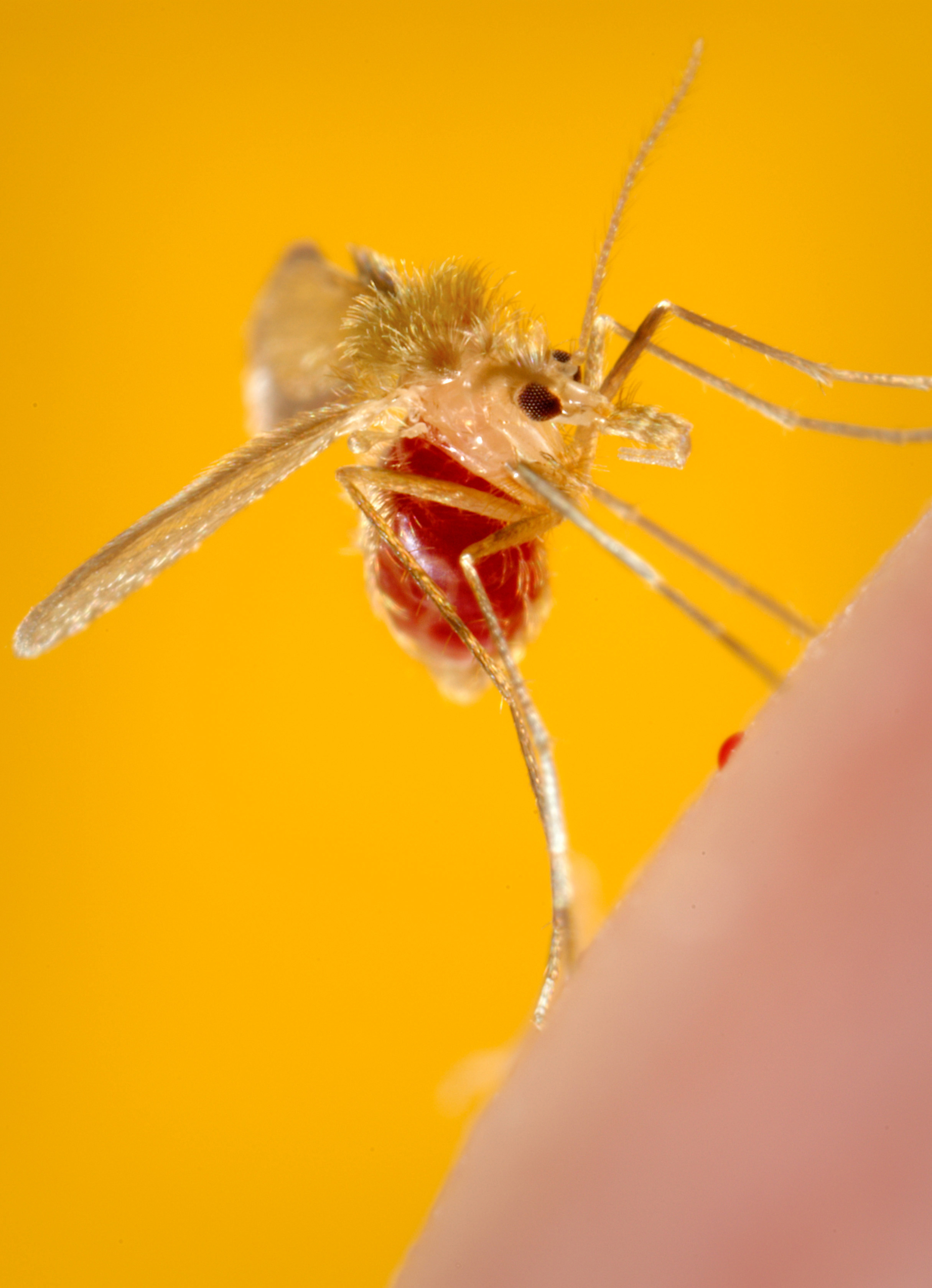
Phlebotomus pappatasi sandfly engorged with blood

=== Biting midges (family Ceratopogonidae) ===
Typical genera are Culicoides and Leptoconops (the term "midge" is also used for dipteran flies that are harmless to domestic animals such as those also known as lake-flies (Chironomidae).

==== Morphology, lifecycle, hosts and feeding ====
These are small to minute flies (a typical vernacular name is "no-see-ums"). Wings are veined, short, and rounded, usually with distinctive patterns of dark brown on clear backgrounds. Mouthparts are relatively short and complex with three pairs of cutting or slashing elements that create a superficial wound from which blood is imbibed. Lifecycle is similar to that of mosquitoes: female feeds on blood, matures, and lays batch of eggs repeatedly. Males are not blood feeders. The site for larval development is within wet soil and bogs. Hosts of biting midges are wide variety of mammals and birds.

==== Parasitic diseases and transmitted organisms ====
Severe biting stress to cattle, sheep and horses is caused. Horses suffer from a cutaneous hypersensitivity reaction called sweet-itch, or Queensland-itch that is caused by antigenic components of saliva of biting midges. Poultry may be severely afflicted with biting stress. Species such as Culicoides imicola and Culicoides variipennis transmit bluetongue virus between sheep and cattle (see diagram and photograph above), and they transmit African horse sickness virus between horses and other equids. Culicoides midges transmit Leucocytozoon protozoa to poultry birds.

=== Sandflies (family Psychodidae) ===
The important genera are Phlebotomus (distributed in Africa and Eurasia) and Lutzomyia (distributed in the Americas). The term "sandfly" is often used to refer to various other types of flies.

==== Morphology, lifecycle, hosts, and feeding ====
Sandflies are like small versions of mosquitoes, but also with overall furry appearance from many long setae (like hairs) on body and wings (see photograph of Phlebotomus pappatasi). Mouthparts are medium length. Lifecycle is similar to midges: site for egg laying and larval development is surface of relatively dry soil. Many species of mammals and birds are used as hosts. Females suck blood using medium length complex mouthparts, whilst males feed on plant sugars.

==== Transmitted organisms ====
Species of Phlebotomus and Lutzomyia sandflies are notorious as transmitters of species of Leishmania protozoa that cause visceral and cutaneous leishmaniasis in domestic animals and also humans. Dogs become infected with Leishmania infantum and L.tropica; the infection can slowly develop into a multi-organ stage with fatal consequences.

=== Black-flies (family Simuliidae) ===
The typical genus is Simulium, but also Cnephia and Austrosimulium are locally important.

==== Morphology, lifecycle, hosts, and feeding ====
These are medium nematocerans, halfway in size between mosquitoes and midges. The body is compact, wings are clear except for veins close to leading edge, and antennae are short with compact segments appearing like rings. Thorax is dorsally humped and dark brown or black (see photograph of Simulium). Lifecycle is similar to mosquitoes: females lay eggs on plants at surface of streams and rivers; larvae settle onto solid substrate in water and feed on suspended organic detritus; pupation occurs at water surface. Hosts are most livestock species, horses and poultry and many wild animals. Humans also may be severely distressed by blackflies. Feeding is through skin with short complex slashing mouthparts.

==== Parasitic diseases and transmitted organisms ====
Severe biting stress when they seasonally swarm near running water. Severe anaphylaxis may develop rapidly in previously sensitized hosts, potentially leading to death of cattle. Simulium black-flies transmit to Leucocytozoon protozoa poultry. They also transmit Onchocerca nematode worms to cattle causing bovine onchocerciasis.

== Brachycera (suborder) ==
The former suborder Cyclorrhapha is now usually classified as part of the Brachycera.

=== General characteristics. ===
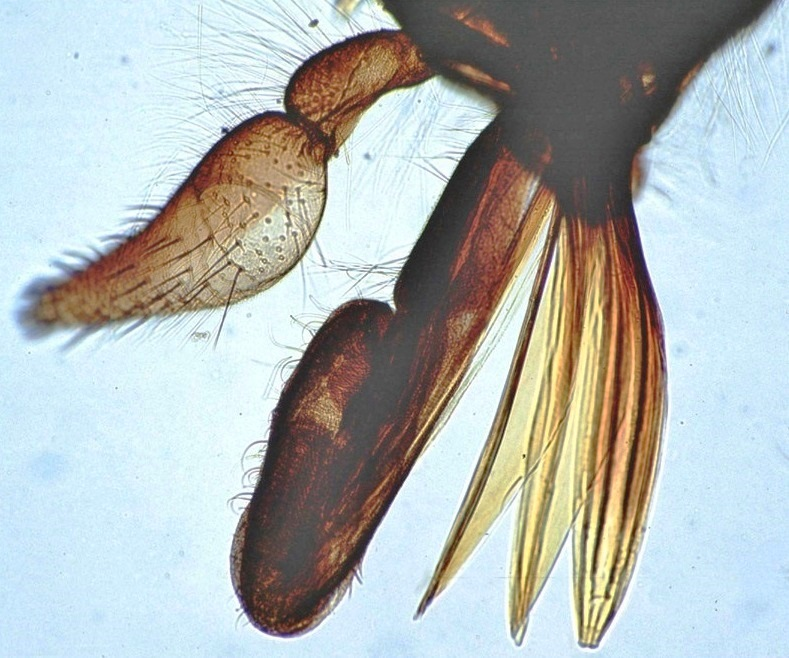
Mouthparts of Tabanus horse-fly: sensory palp at left, sponging labella at center, skin-piercing elements at right.

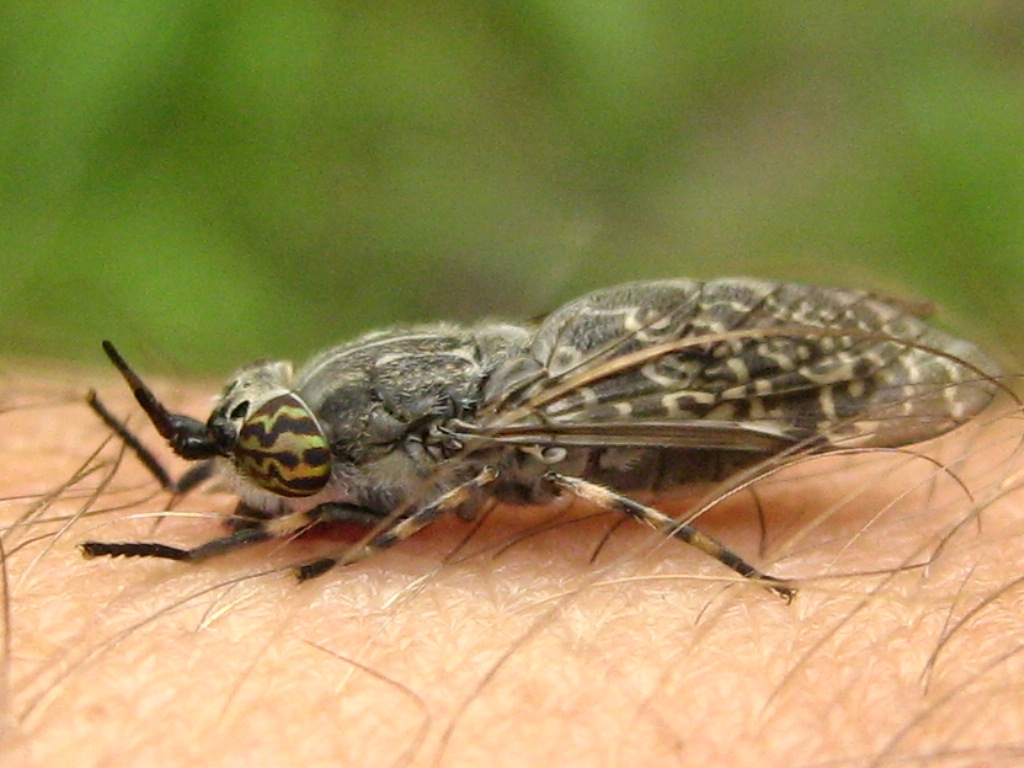
Haematopota pluvialis tabanid fly showing distinct patterns on eyes and wings.

Antennae consist of three relatively short segments with asymmetric shapes. Brachyceran flies are of medium to large size and compact shape. They have large compound eyes, well developed wings, and generally fly during daytime seeking food and mates. Life-cycle is a complete metamorphosis, as for Nematocera. However, in contrast to nematoceran flies which have larvae always non-parasitic and living in the general habitat, some species of brachyceran flies are parasitic in their larval stage whilst the adults that develop from these larvae are non-parasitic. This parasitism by brachyceran larvae causes the disease myiasis.

Some of the brachyceran flies are important transmitters of pathogenic organisms through a route known as mechanical (or contaminative) transmission. These flies have complex cutting mouthparts that make a superficial wound in skin. Blood flowing into the wound is sponged up by the labella organ of the mouthparts (see photograph of Tabanus mouthparts). The flies tend to take small meals from many hosts at short intervals, to avoid the defensive actions of their hosts. Fresh blood on the labella may contaminate other hosts with pathogenic organisms. Many species of brachyceran flies such as the house-flies and blow-flies that do not feed on blood are also mechanical transmitters of pathogenic organisms by a contaminative route on their mouthparts used for sponging up wet nutritious secretions on skin of vertebrate animals. Usually the mechanical transmission of microbes by flies does not involve any developmental stage of the microorganism in the fly. However, some brachyceran flies, such as a group of species of genus Glossina, are important biological transmitters, not mechanical.

=== Horse-flies (Family Tabanidae). ===
Typical genera are Tabanus, Haematopota, Chrysops and Hybromitra, also many other genera of importance to domestic animals in some regions of world, tropical and subtropical South America especially.

==== Morphology, life-cycle, hosts and feeding. ====
These are large robust flies with massive eyes that often show colored patterns. Antennae are characteristic with three dissimilar segments projecting forward from head. Wings are large and strong with complex venation, and often with complex patterns of brown on clear background. These flies are adapted to hunt widely for their hosts during daytime. Females take repeated small blood meals from their hosts to support development of a large batch of eggs. Eggs are laid on wet soil where larvae develop, sometimes over one or two years by feeding on soil organisms. Males do not feed on blood. Hosts of females include all species of mammalian livestock animals and horses. Tabanid flies have large mouthparts comprising three pairs of cutting / slashing elements that pierce skin in a superficial wound. Blood flowing from this is imbibed through a sponge-like element of the mouthparts, the labella (similar to that shown in photograph of Calliphora).

==== Parasitic diseases and transmitted organisms. ====
Bites of tabanid flies are painful. Dense populations of these flies cause severe biting stress to livestock and horses leading to reduction of gain in liveweight. These hosts may additionally suffer loss of grazing time by clustering in tight defensive packs, a situation known as fly-syndrome. Many genera of tabanid flies transmit the protozoan Trypanosoma evansi that causes in camels and horses the disease called surra. These flies also transmit the protozoan T.vivax that causes in cattle the disease called nagana. Tabanid flies are also transmitters the bacteria Anaplasma marginale and A.centrale to cattle, sheep and goats, causing anaplasmosis.

=== House-flies, Stable-flies and similar (Family Muscidae). ===
Typical genera are Musca, Hydrotaea, Stomoxys and Haematobia.

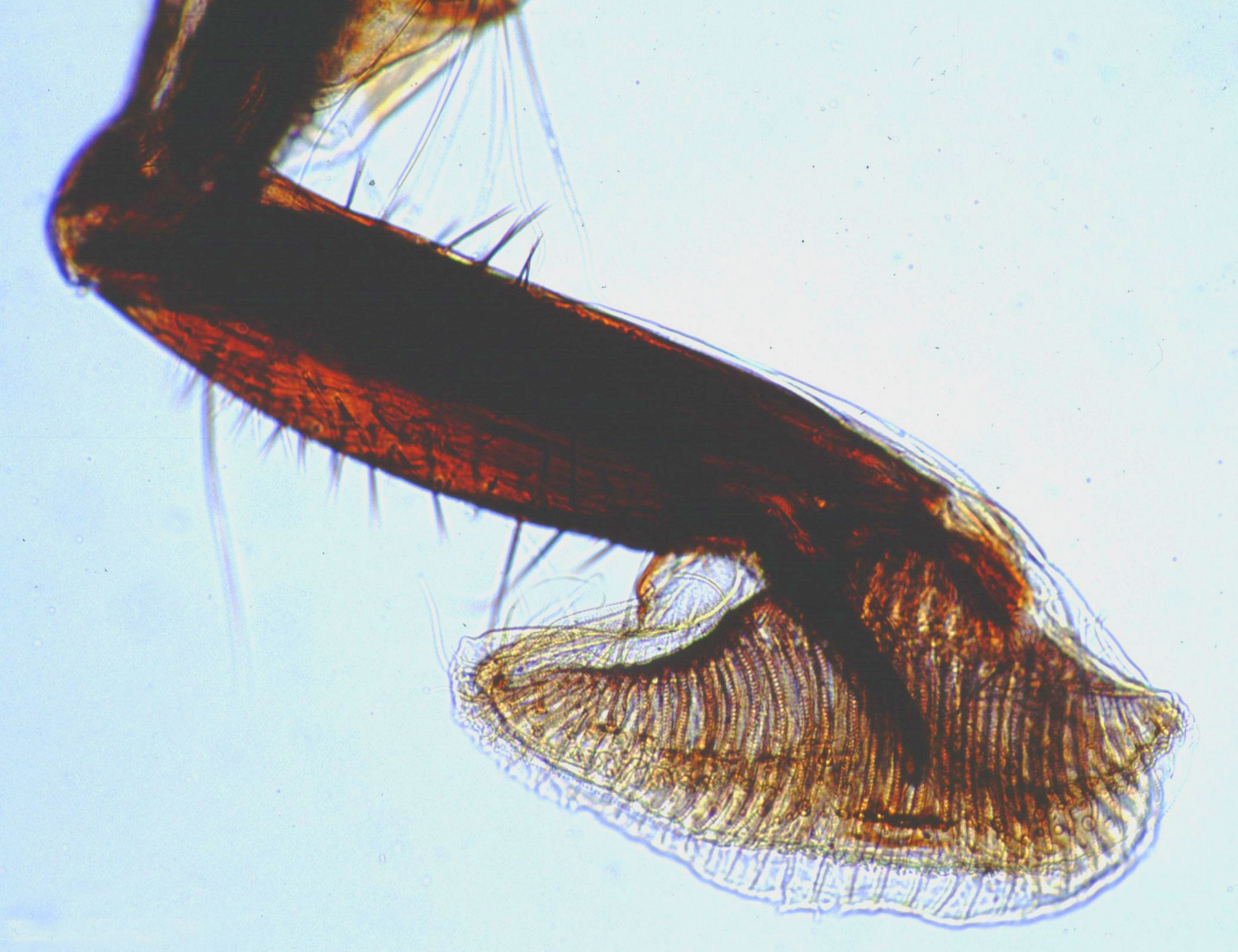
Mouthparts of Calliphora blowfly showing sponge structure of labella at lower right.

==== Morphology, life-cycle, hosts and feeding. ====
These are medium to large flies of compact structure, with clear wings of complex venation. Antennae are highly characteristic with antennae consisting of several compact segments that lie in a deep groove between the eyes; the outermost segment of each antenna bears a feather like structure, the arista, which projects forwards. Species within Musca, Hydrotaea, and similar genera have mouthparts adapted for sponging nutritious liquids with their labellar lobes (see photograph of Calliphora mouthparts which also have this sponge structure). Some species of this type, such as Musca vestustissima (Australian bush-fly) also have, as part of this sponge structure, small teeth that can scrape at host's skin down to superficial capillaries to feed on blood. Cattle are a typical host for Musca and similar species of house-flies that are attracted to protein containing liquids at the eyes and nostrils of their hosts.

Species within the genera Stomoxys stable-flies, and Haematobia horn-flies are highly adapted for blood feeding, having mouthparts consisting of a strong projecting labium with cutting elements at its point. This is used to pierce deeply into skin of host to access blood (see photograph of Stomoxys in the Gallery below. Females of these flies typically take repeated small meals from their hosts to support production of their batches of eggs. Both females and males feed only on blood. Cattle and domestic buffalo are also the main hosts of Stomoxys and Haematobia flies.

==== Parasitic diseases and transmitted organisms. ====
Irritation is caused by large numbers of Musca house-flies, through to severe biting stress from dense populations of Stomoxys or Haematobia flies. Musca house-flies, face-flies, and similar types transmit a variety of bacteria involved in mastitis of cattle. The conjunctivitis of cattle known as pink-eye is caused by Moraxella bovis bacteria transmitted by Musca autumnalis face-flies. The feeding of various Musca species of fly permits the contaminative transmission of nematode worms, for example Parafilaria bovicola, causing a nodular filariasis in cattle. Stomoxys species transmit several species of Trypanosoma protozoa to cattle, sheep and goats causing various types of trypanosomiasis. Haematobia horn-flies transmit nematode worms in the genus Stephanofilaria to the skin of cattle, causing stephanofilariasis, a suppurating dermatitis known as hump sore. Stomoxys flies transmit the bacterium Eperythrozoon ovis to sheep and this infection may lead to fever and anemia.

=== Tsetse-flies (Family Glossinidae). ===
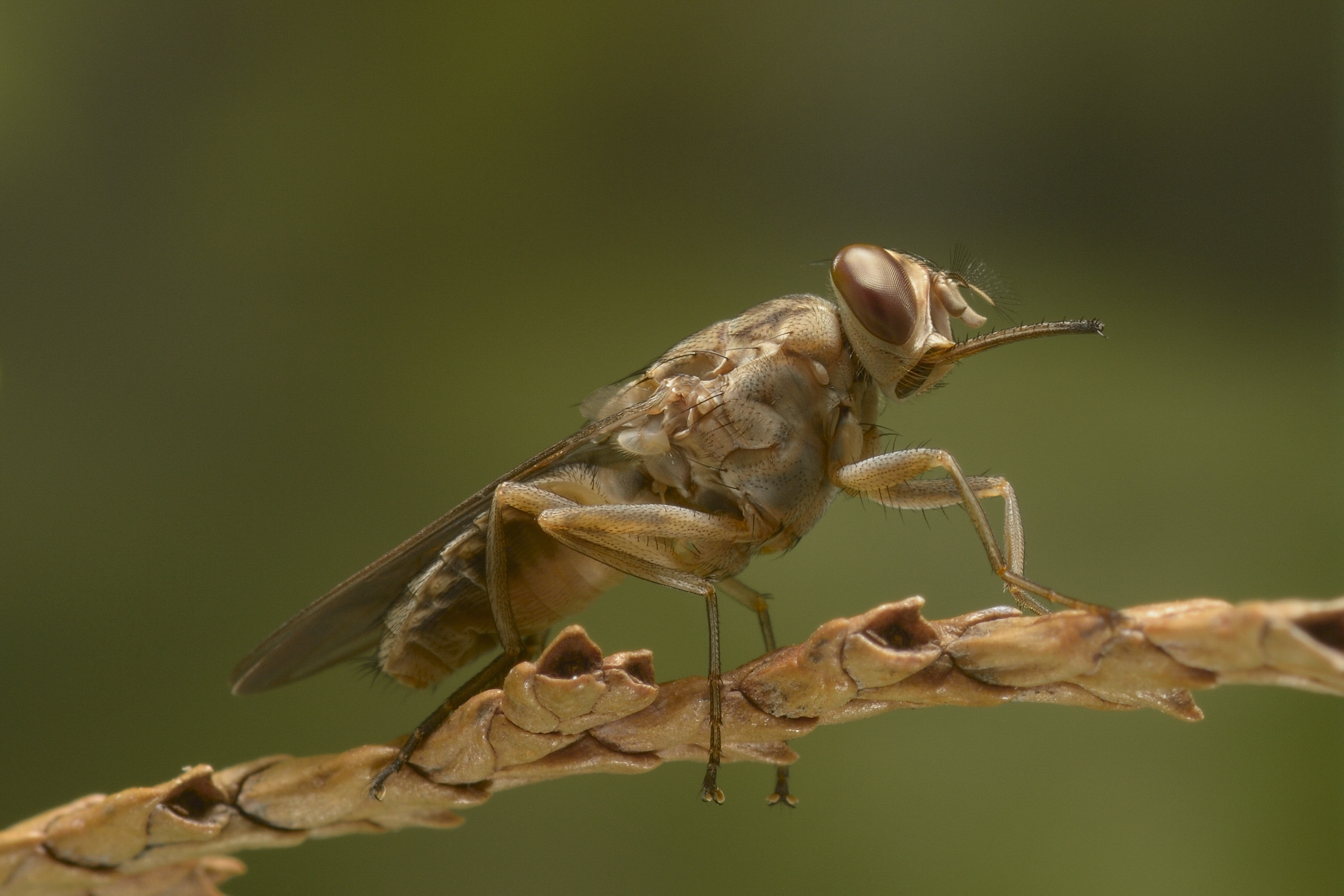
Glossina adult tsetse fly; piercing mouthparts conspicuous.

There is one genus in this Family: Glossina, known as tsetse-flies or simply tsetse. Flies of this family are similar to Stomoxys flies within the Muscidae, but have a life cycle and veterinary and medical importance justifying a separate Family designation. Tsetse-flies are found only in sub-Saharan Africa.

==== Morphology, life-cycle, hosts and feeding. ====
These flies are closely similar to Stomoxys and Haematobia, but are larger and of a paler brown color. Tsetse-flies of both sexes are robust fliers adapted for hunting their hosts during daytime. Male adults support their mating activity with repeated meals of blood from cattle and similar wild bovid hosts, also wild pigs and warthogs are favored. Life-cycle of tsetse-fly is highly specialized. Females take repeated small meals of blood to support the development within their abdomen of a single larvae over one period. This will be repeated for as many times as the female is able to survive, depending mostly on availability of hosts. The single larva emerges fully grown from the female, weighing more than the female. Then the larva immediately burrows into dry sandy soil to pupate within a protective puparium. A new adult emerges from the puparium after a complete metamorphosis. This is known as larviparous reproduction, with the advantage of high survival rate of offspring, but few offspring are produced by each female.

==== Parasitic diseases and transmitted organisms. ====
Bites from tsetse flies are painful but these flies are not generally associated with direct causes of lost production in cattle. Glossina morsitans and G.pallidipes tsetse-flies are transmitters of various species of Trypanosoma protozoa causing animal trypanosomiasis (= nagana) in cattle, and other forms of trypanosomiasis in sheep, goats, pigs, camels and horses. Tsetse-flies are also notorious as transmitters of the Trypanosoma species causing African trypanosomiasis (= sleeping sickness) in humans.

=== Blow-flies (Family Calliphoridae). ===
Important genera include Calliphora, Lucilia, Chrysomya, Cochliomyia and Wohlfahrtia.

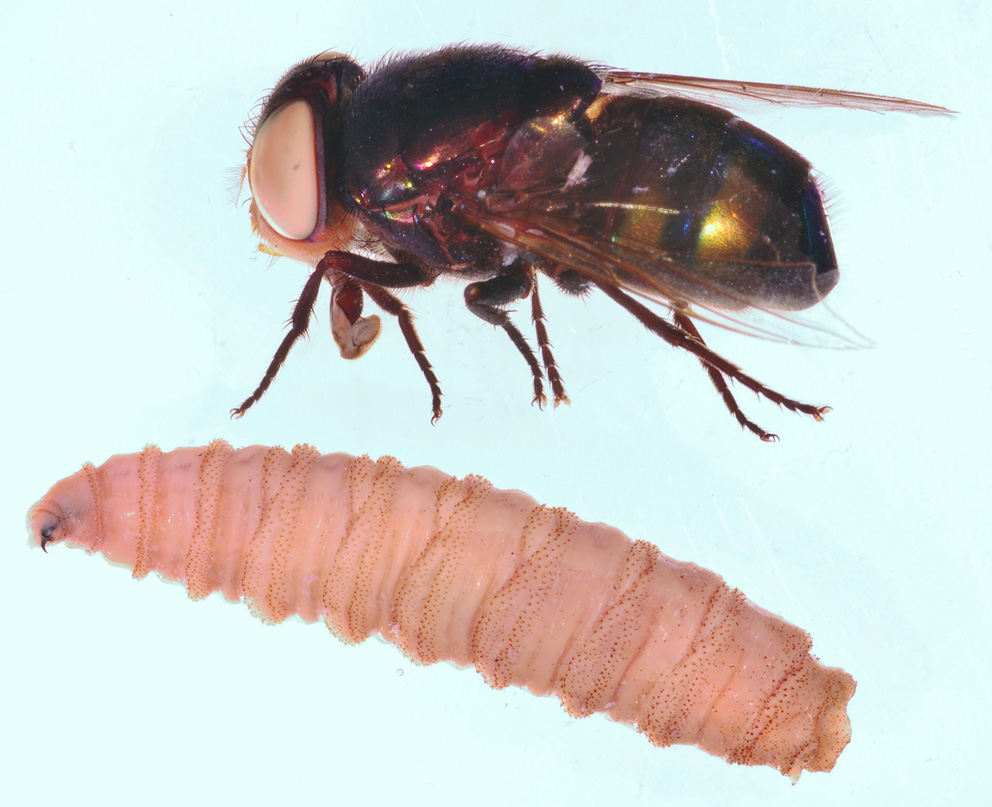
Chrysomia bezziana, Old World screw-worm, adult fly and third stage larva of type causing myiasis (see header photograph of C.megacephala for colors of live fly).

==== Morphology, life-cycle, hosts and feeding. ====
All calliphorid flies are all large, robust, strong day-time fliers. Their antennae are as described above for house-flies and others in the Family Muscidae. Adult flies in family Calliphoridae feed as adults of both sexes mostly on proteinaceous liquids found on surface of decaying animal carcasses and similar material. These liquids are taken in using sponging mouthparts (see photograph of Calliphora). In genera such as Calliphora and Lucilia the females lay their eggs on the same dead animal material and the larvae feed their by rasping at the muscle and other tissues with their mouthparts. However, species of Lucilia and some other genera may opportunistically invade the tissues of live hosts, such as sheep or cattle and feed there parasitically. Other genera such as Chrysomya, Cochliomyia and Wohlfahrtia are specifically adapted for this type of feeding by the larvae.

==== Parasitic diseases and transmitted organisms. ====
When larvae of Lucilia feed parasitically they cause the disease facultative myiasis (facultative = opportunistic or optional). When this occurs on sheep it is often known as blow-fly strike. This causes severe distress to the host and may be fatal due to toxemia from ammonia excreted by masses of infesting larvae. Females of Chrysomya, Cochliomyia and Wohlfahrtia and similar genera always seek out their host such as cattle, sheep, dogs, to lay their eggs at vulnerable sites such as a small wound. The larvae hatch and rapidly invade the superficial layers of skin to continue feeding there until ready to pupate. This form of parasitism is essential for these types of fly, and causes obligate myiasis (obligate = necessary or essential). This infestation develops into severe disease and can be fatal if the infestation is at a vulnerable site such as ear or navel of the host. Adult blow-flies such as those in the genus Calliphora can be significant as transmitters of various bacteria involved in mastitis of cattle. The conjunctivitis of cattle known as pink-eye is caused by Moraxella bovis bacteria and may be transmitted by blow-flies.

=== Bot-flies and warble-flies (Family Oestridae). ===
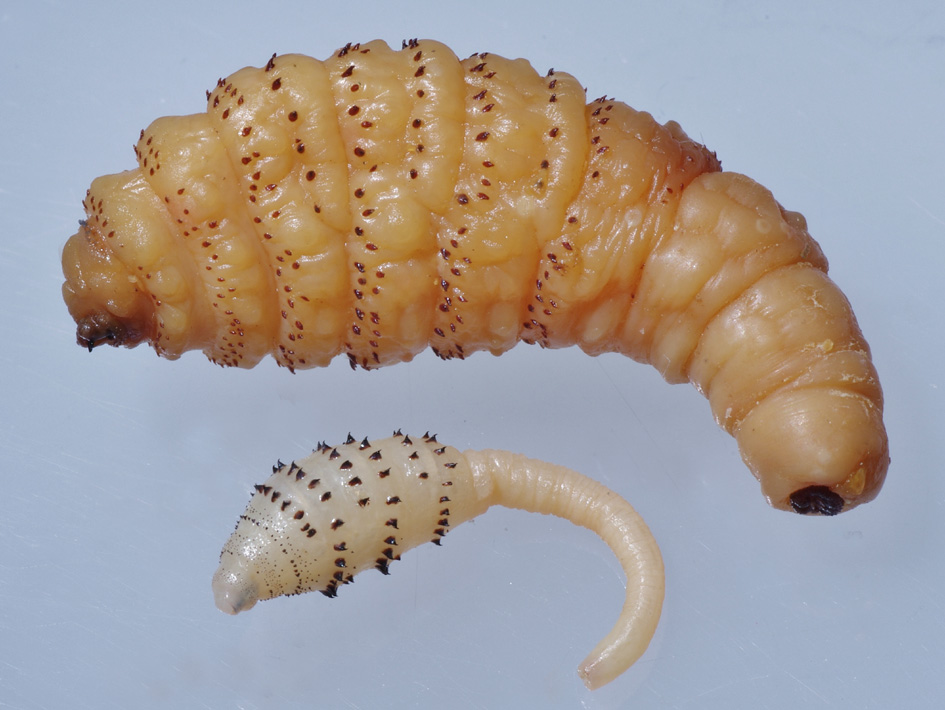
Larvae of Dermatobia hominis, Torsalo bot-fly; third stage larva top, first stage larva bottom.

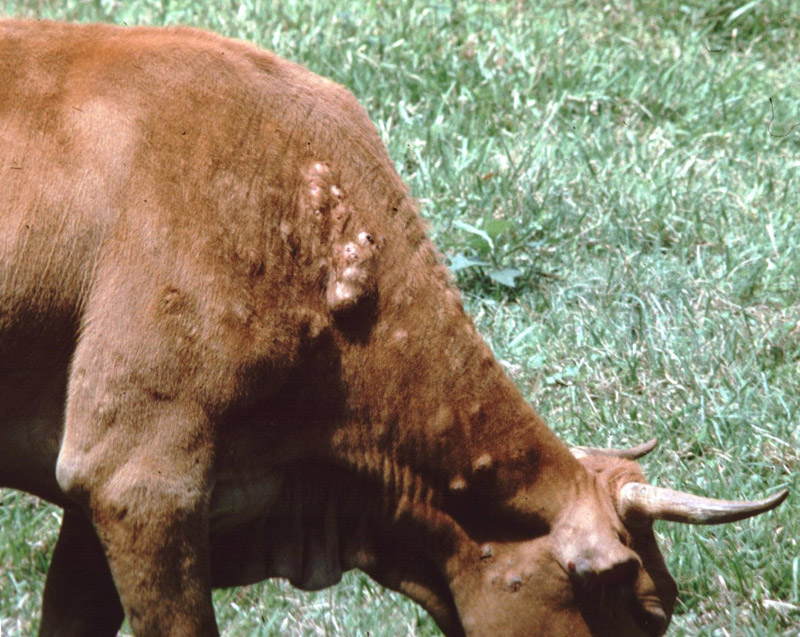
Furuncular myiasis at shoulder and neck of cow caused by infestation of Dermatobia hominis larvae.

Typical genera are Hypoderma, Gasterophilus, Dermatobia and Oestrus (fly). Oestrid flies at their larval stage tend to be adapted to feed on a few closely related species of host animal and the adult females fly actively to seek out only these hosts on which to lay their eggs.

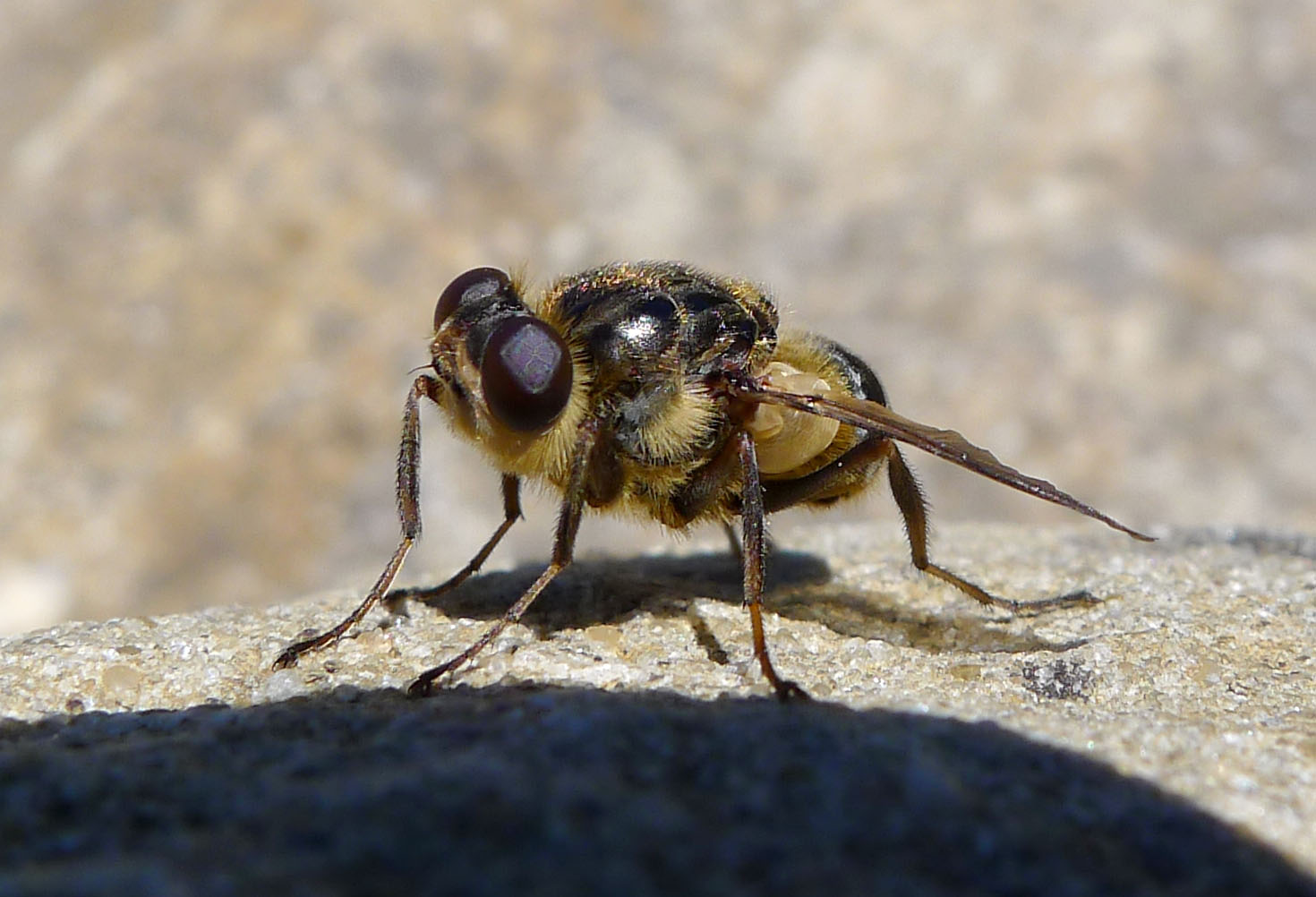
Adult warble fly, Hypoderma iparece, showing furry appearance and lack of mouthparts.

==== Morphology, life-cycle, hosts and feeding. ====
Adults are large flies, and unusual amongst brachyceran flies because they have a dense covering of fine setae (like hairs) and colored patterns that make them appear like bumble-bees (Hymenoptera). All species of the Oestridae are so highly adapted to the myiasis type of parasitism that the adults do not feed and have only residual mouthparts (see photograph of Hypoderma iparece). All these flies have an obligate myiasis life-cycle, with a complete metamorphosis. The females lay eggs with high selectivity on their special hosts and at specific sites there. For example, eggs laid on the legs of horses in the case of species of Gasterophilus. The horse licks at the irritated skin and the larvae transfer to the mouth of horse. The larvae penetrate tissues in the oral cavity, feed parasitically whilst migrating through tissue of the esophagus to finally reach the stomach. The final larval stage is completed with the larvae attached to the mucosa of the horse's stomach. When ready to pupate the larvae detach and are voided in the horse's feces. Another example is Dermatobia hominis, torsalo-fly, which is an important parasite of cattle, and sometimes humans, in tropical regions of South America. The larvae cause a localized, furuncular (= like a boil) myiasis in the skin of their hosts. The larvae infest these sites when transported there accidentally by blood feeding mosquitoes; the adult female Dermatobia flies lay their eggs on the legs of mosquitoes, a dispersal mechanism called phoresy.

==== Parasitic diseases and transmitted organisms. ====
Obligate myiasis of various forms are typical of the oestrid genera. Larval Dermatobia torsalo-flies infest the skin and underlying tissues of cattle causing distress, reduced gain in weight and damage to skins used for leather. Larval Gasterophilus stomach-bots infest the upper gastric tract and stomach of horses and other equids. Larval Hypoderma warble-flies infest the skin and muscles of cattle. Larval Oestrus nasal-bots infest the nasal cavities of sheep and goats. In the case of stomach-bots it is often uncertain how much clinical disease or loss of production small levels of infestation causes the host. With infestations of warble-flies and nasal-bots severe distress to the hosts may be caused and there are production losses from reduction of value of cattle hides, and reduced grazing time by sheep. Harm to cattle may be caused through panic (known as gadding) at the approach of the flies if that leads to traumatic injury. There are no organisms of known importance transmitted by oestrid flies.

=== Louse-flies (Family Hippoboscidae). ===
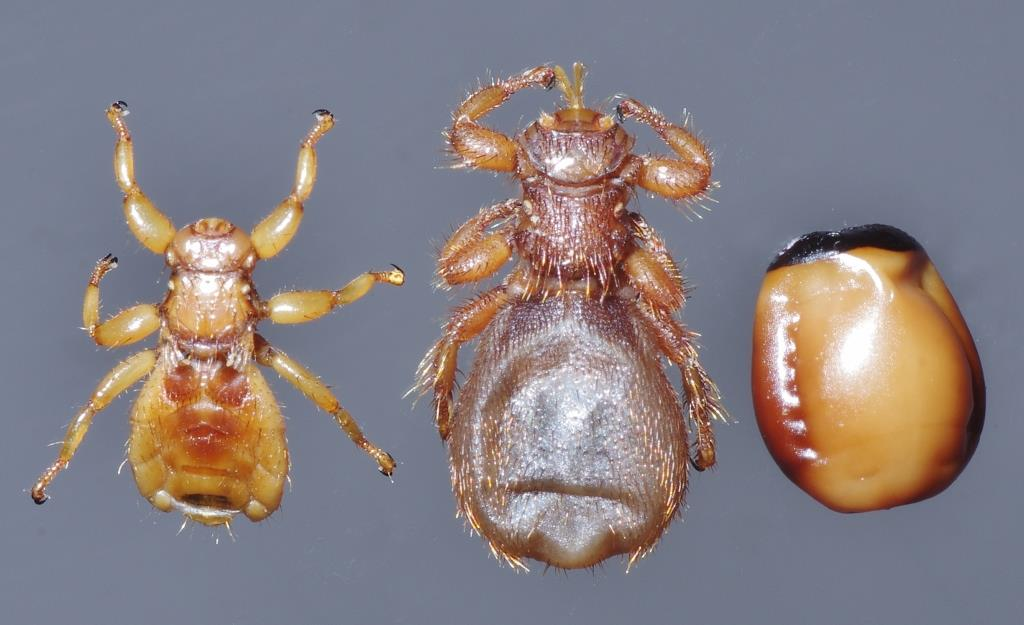
Melophagus ovinus sheep-ked: male at left, female center, puparium right.

Genera of importance are Melophagus and Hippobosca. This is a Family of specialized blood feeding flies with a reproductive cycle similar that described for tsetse-flies. They are often known as louse-flies because some species either shed their wings when as adults they find a host after active flying (in genus Lipoptena). Alternatively flies of genus Melophagus are so adapted to parasitism that the adults never develop wings. Louse-flies without wings may appear like ticks, but the only stage of tick seen with three pairs of legs will be larvae these are much smaller than louse-flies.

==== Morphology, life-cycle, hosts and feeding. ====
Adults of the genus Hippobosca are large, robust flies that retain their wings to fly for repeated blood meals, between hosts such as cattle, camels or horses in a herd. Stout piercing mouthparts project downward from the head (see Hippobosca in Gallery). The abdomen bulges largely, especially when containing a developing larva. The life-cycle is the larviparous type, similar to that of tsetse-flies, few offspring are produced per female but their survival rate is high. In species that never develop wings as adults, such as Melophagus ovinus, the sheep-ked, the fully developed larvae are deposited by the female on the hair coat of the host. There pupation occurs rapidly followed by complete metamorphosis into an adult (see photograph of Melophagus).

==== Parasitic diseases and transmitted organisms. ====
Irritation and biting-stress is caused. Damage to skin results in poor quality of leather when hides are processed, a condition known as cockle. Sheep-keds transmit the bacterium Eperythrozoon ovis to sheep and this infection may cause fever and anemia. They also transmit Trypanosoma melophagium, but this protozoan seems non-pathogenic.

== Prevention of infestation and infection ==
=== Physical barriers and hygiene ===
These usually consist of netting made of synthetic fibers or fine metal mesh that is fitted to the ventilation slats or windows of housing for livestock animals. The fiber netting can be impregnated with insecticides such as the synthetic pyrethroid deltamethrin that acts rapidly when flies such as Stomoxys or Glossina species land on it. Valuable horses in areas infested with Culicoides midges or Simulium black-flies can be protected with commercially available shields made of cloth that fit over head, neck and back. Flies such as the Musca, Stomoxys, and Haematobia species have larval habitats amongst livestock dung and soiled bedding found around livestock farms. There is scope for reducing fly infestation by clearing these wastes to composting containers or areas. However, for many types of dipteran flies, the larvae inhabit areas such as bogs (Culicoides), swamps (mosquitoes), or rivers (Simulium) that are impractical to treat under typical commercial constraints within agriculture.

=== Chemical repellents and insecticides, and botanical preparations ===
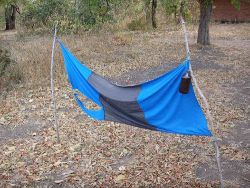
Target to control Glossina tsetse-flies; colors of cloth attract flies and cloth is treated with insecticide, brown bottle at top right of target contains an odor attractant.

Synthetic chemicals such as diethyltoluamide (often called DEET) dissolved in an oily carrier are sometimes used. Also there are various organic, botanical repellents such as citronella oil and neem oil. Typically various types of synthetic pyrethroids such as deltamethrin, cypermethrin, and permethrin are formulated in an oil or watery suspension suitable for application direct to the skin of animals at risk. This is usually done with a pour-on applicator along the back line of the host from where the insecticide spreads downwards through the hair coat. In addition, to protect against flies such as Stomoxys and Glossina species that feed on legs and belly the insecticide can be sprayed selectively to those regions. Also, cattle can be treated using self-applicators such as back-rubbers made of large bundles of fiber impregnated with the insecticide, or in automatic walk-through sprayers. The same types of insecticides are also formulated into the plastic sheet of ear tags for protecting cattle against Musca and similar flies feeding around the head of cattle. Insect growth regulators (juvenile hormones, chitin synthesis inhibitors, etc.) are available. For example, the insect growth regulator cyromazine is effective for the prevention or treatment of infestations with blowfly larvae. Botanical extracts such as azadirachtin from the neem tree can be formulated as repellents and insecticides, with the potential advantage of more rapid degradation to harmless forms in the environment, lower toxicity and potentially lower cost.

=== Traps and targets ===
These can contribute to control of blowflies and tsetse-flies for example. The blowfly traps contain a liquid that smells like the rotting flesh of a carcass and the structure of the trap is designed to prevent the flies from escaping once attracted in. Horse-flies can be controlled by traps that attract the flies to a suspended black ball that mimics a potential host; flies attracted become trapped in a cone above. For area-wide control of tsetse-flies targets (these do not trap the flies) that combine a rectangle of dark blue or black cloth and often an attractant chemical act as simple mimics of the fly's host. When the flies land on the cloth they contact the synthetic pyrethroid that is impregnated into the cloth.

=== Sterile insect technique ===
This technique was used to eradicate Cochliomyia hominivorax screw-worm fly from the USA where the flies were endemic, and from Libya where there had been an accidental importation from South America. Although this species of blowfly under natural conditions has larvae of the obligate myiasis type, it is possible to colonize the entire lifecycle in large factory conditions. Massive numbers of pupae are sterilized by irradiation. When released, these flies mate with the wild flies and the matings produce no offspring. The reproductive rate of the wild flies can be reduced to the level of eradication. Eradication schemes are being extended in the Americas.

=== Pharmaceutical drugs and vaccines ===
Infections with Trypanosoma species are treated, either prophylactically or to treat acute cases with synthetic chemical drugs such as diminazine. Infections with nematode worms causing filariosis may be treated with the avermectin class of biologically derived drugs (macrocyclic lactones) such as ivermectin, doramectin, moxidectin. There are commercially available vaccines to protect animals against bluetongue, and African horse sickness

== Gallery ==
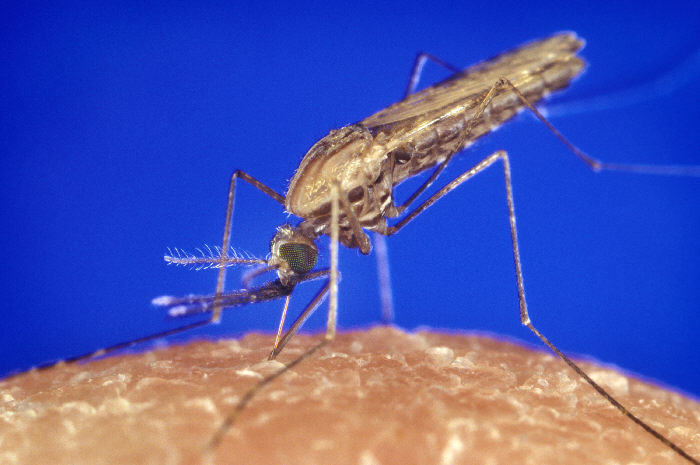
Anopheles gambiae female mosquito feeding.

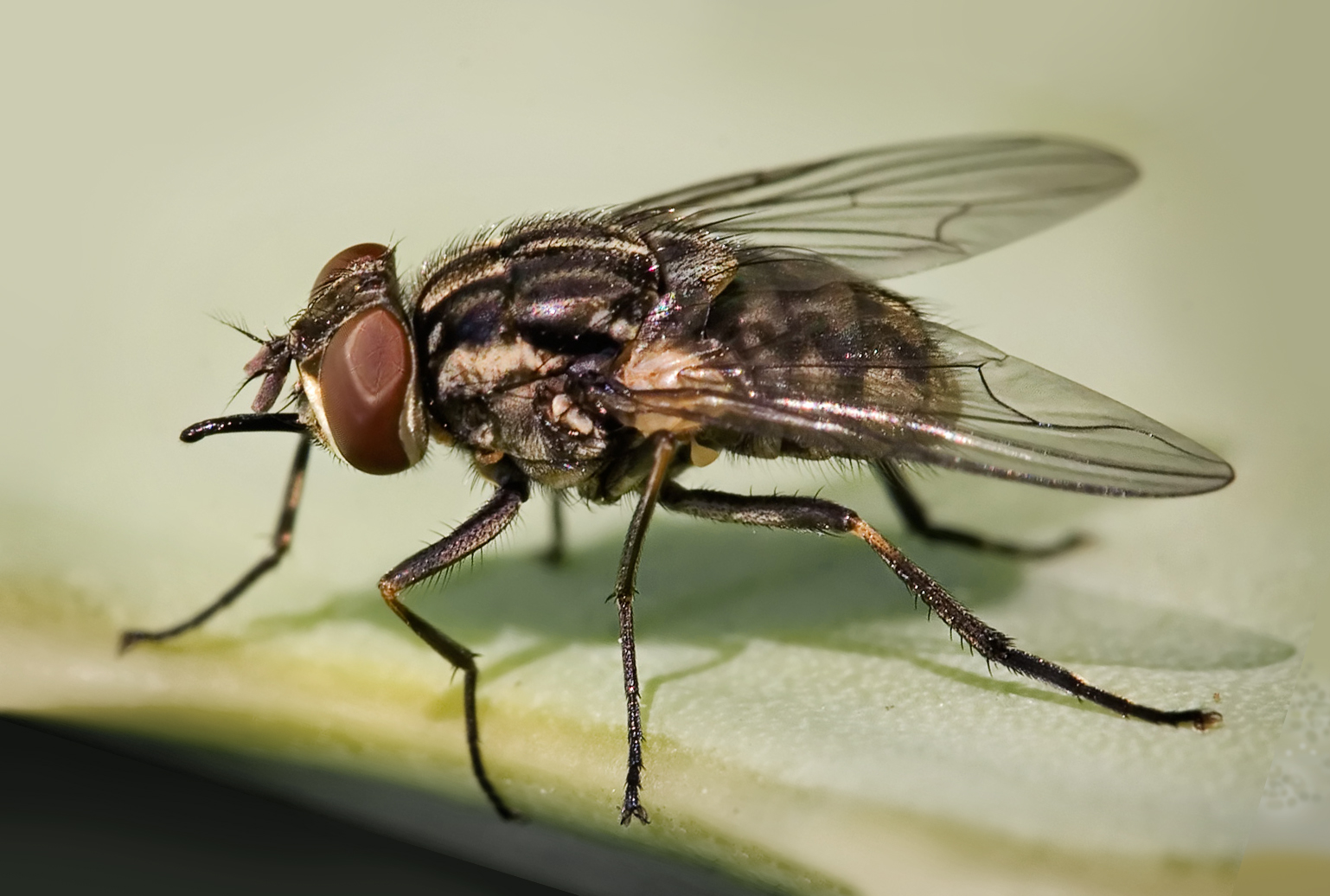
Stomxys calcitrans adult stable-fly.

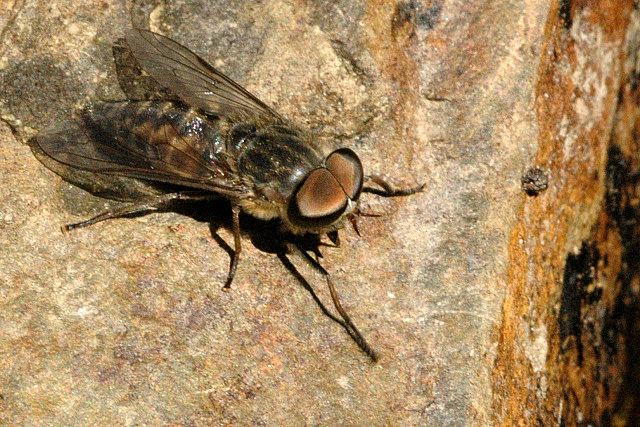
Tabanus bovinus adult tabanid fly.

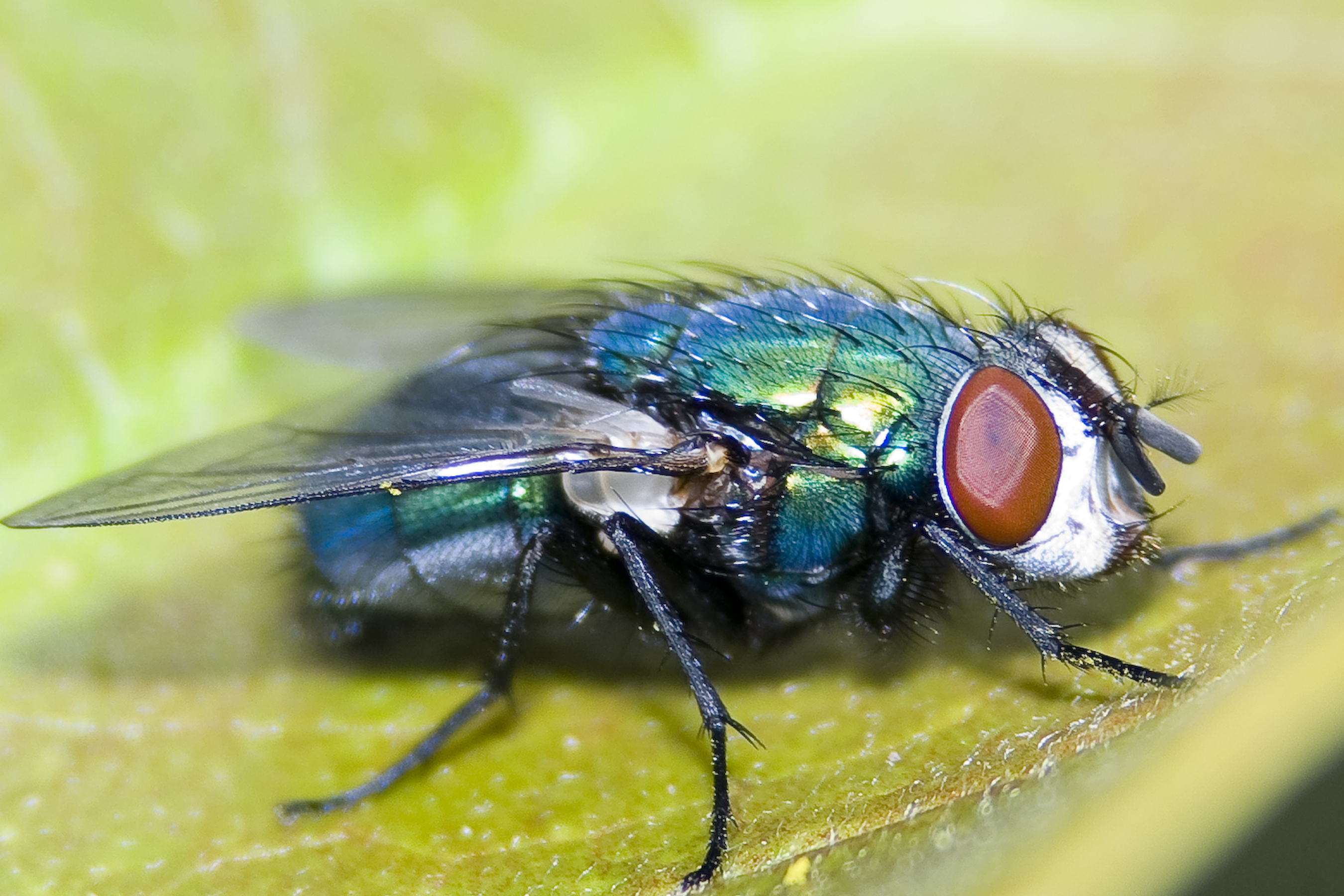
Lucilia caesar blow-fly ("green-bottle").

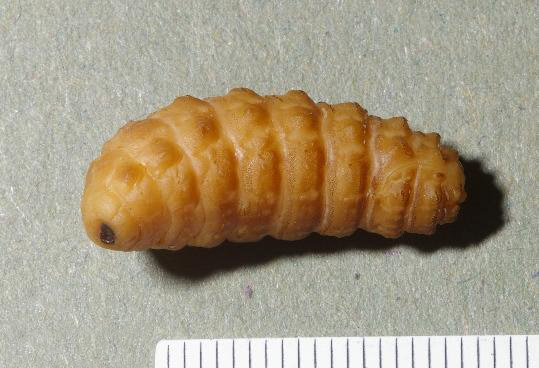
Hypoderma warble-fly mature larva (mm scale).

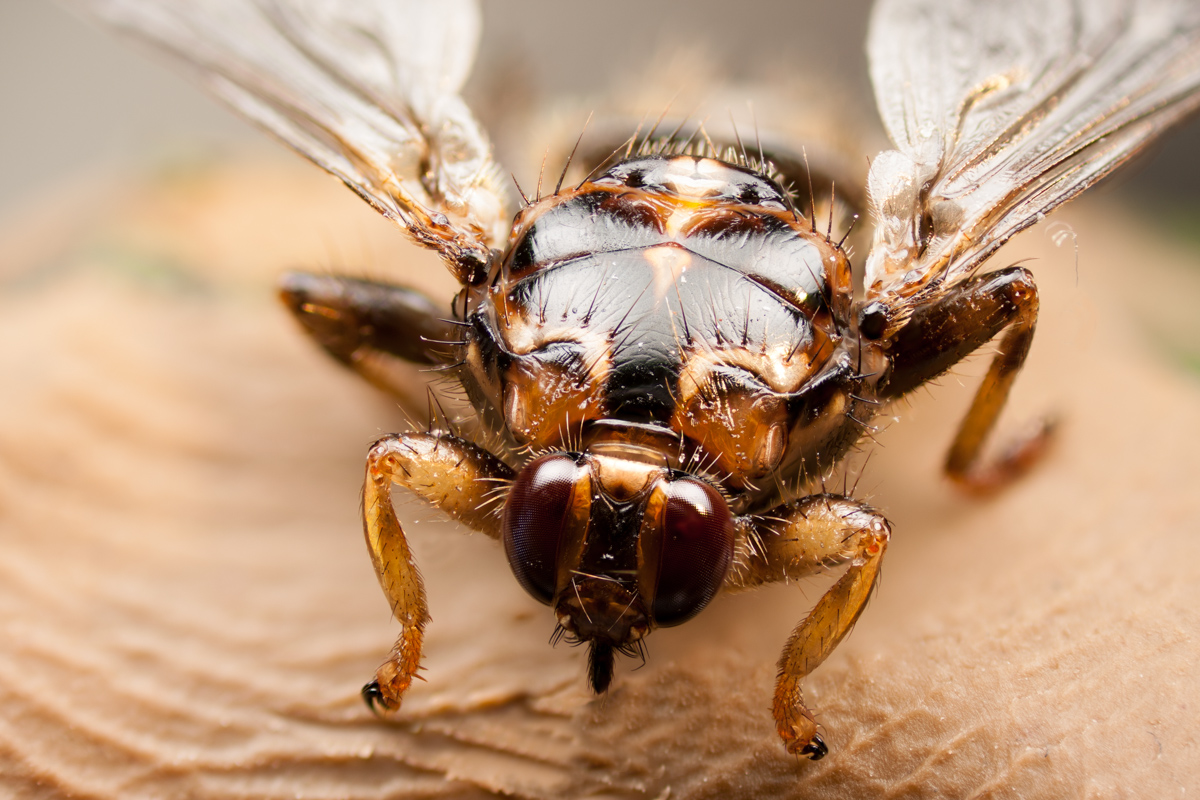
Hippobosca equina louse-fly ("New Forest fly").
