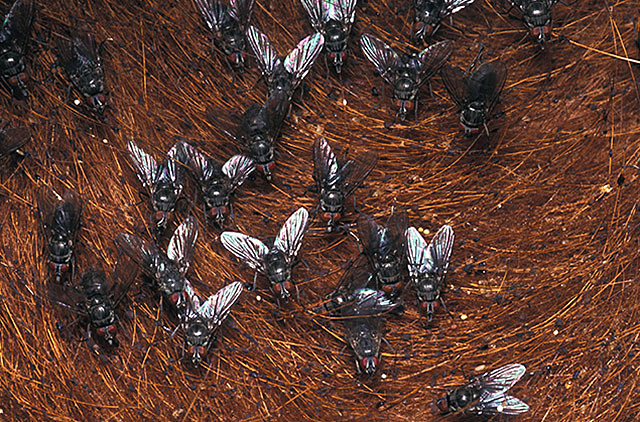
- Haematobia irritans on horse

Scientific classification
- Kingdom: Animalia
- Phylum: Arthropoda
- Clade: Pancrustacea
- Class: Insecta
- Order: Diptera
- Family: Muscidae
- Tribe: Stomoxyini
- Genus: Haematobia
- Species: H. irritans

Binomial name
- Haematobia irritans (Linnaeus, 1758)

Synonyms
- Conops irritans Linnaeus, 1758; Haematobia serrata Robineau-Desvoidy, 1830

= Haematobia irritans =

Species of fly

Haematobia irritans, the horn fly, is a small fly (about half the size of a common housefly). It was first described by Carl Linnaeus in his 1758 10th edition of Systema Naturae. It is of the genus Haematobia which is the European genus of bloodsucking flies. Haematobia irritans is a native of Europe but has been introduced to North America and is considered a potentially dangerous livestock pest.

== Appearance ==
H. irritans is the smallest of the biting muscids, gray in color, approximately 3/16 in (4.0 mm) in length. Both the male and female have slender, black, piercing mouthparts which project forward from the bottom of the head. They often aggregate densely on cattle, each fly oriented with its head in the same direction as hair tips of that site on the host. Horn flies typically have eyes that are dark reddish brown.

== Egg laying, habitat and feeding ==
The horn fly lays eggs in fresh cow manure, and the female is known to lay her eggs in the feces before the cow has even completed defecation.

The larvae remain in fresh pats of the animal's dung and feed on both the resident bacterium and the compositions of the decomposition products of the resident bacterium.

The adult will find a suitable host and remains on it and others in the same herd for life, with the female only leaving to lay her eggs. Horn flies will also move around to different areas on the same animal to regulate their temperature and minimize their exposure to the wind. Both the male and the female subsist completely on blood, using their sharp mouthparts to pierce the animal's hide to suck it out.

Males typically feed around 20 times and females around 40 times daily, and when not feeding they tend to rest around the horn region of the host.

The gut microbiome has been investigated. Palavesam et al 2012 uses next generation sequencing to specify the symbiotic species helping H. irritans to digest bloodmeals.

== Stages of development ==
The horn fly undergoes complete metamorphosis, and has four major stages of development:

The first stage is the egg, which is laid in fresh feces, and hatches quickly. The resulting larval (maggot) stage, which consists of three larval instars (wingless), develops quickly and can last as little as four days. This is followed by the still immature pupa stage (also wingless) which lasts around six to eight days and finally the mature, winged adult stage.

Generational time may be as little as 10 days under ideal conditions, but under less favorable circumstances can average between 14 and 18 days.

== Danger to livestock ==
The horn fly, as can be gleaned from its taxonomic designation Haematobia irritans, is an irritant to livestock. Beyond this, incessant biting is compounded by loss of blood, and results in such detrimental effects on host physiology as to include reduction in milk production, efficiency, and rate of gain. If the host is infested with a large number of flies, the resulting skin irritation and wounds may result in the drawing of a secondary infestation of myasis producing flies. There is some controversy over whether the horn fly is a disease vector, with at least one source asserting that the flies can be an intermediate host of Stephanofilaria stilesi, a parasite of cattle in North America.

== Domestic animals affected ==
Primarily livestock (specifically cattle) are affected, but it is known to feed on horses, sheep and goats, albeit to a lesser extent.

== Range ==
The horn fly is known as a strong flier, and upon emerging as adults they can fly up to 10 miles to find a host. However, most often a horn fly will not have to fly more than three miles to find a host.

== Seasonality and locality ==
Found primarily in and around the states surrounding Kansas. Haematobia irritans is not native to the U.S. and originally came from Europe. It can live in any similarly climatized area, as evidenced by its most recent spread to Argentina and Uruguay. In the U.S., the active time of the horn fly is between April and October and, in a warm fall, even as late as mid-November. The flies are often most abundant from June through mid-July with a second population peak in mid-to-late August.

== Management ==
Fly control tactics are moving away from dependence on pesticides, due to concern for the environment and pests developing resistance to insecticides. The first line of defense involves reducing the horn flies ability to reproduce. Manure and wasted hay can be spread thinly for quick drying, or composted. Composting techniques must allow for the entire mass to reach temperatures that will kill insect eggs (e.g. the Berkley method).

Rotating hens three days behind cattle is an effective method in reducing horn fly populations by scratching apart their habitat as they eat the horn fly larvae. The horn fly eggs take 1 to 2 days to hatch.

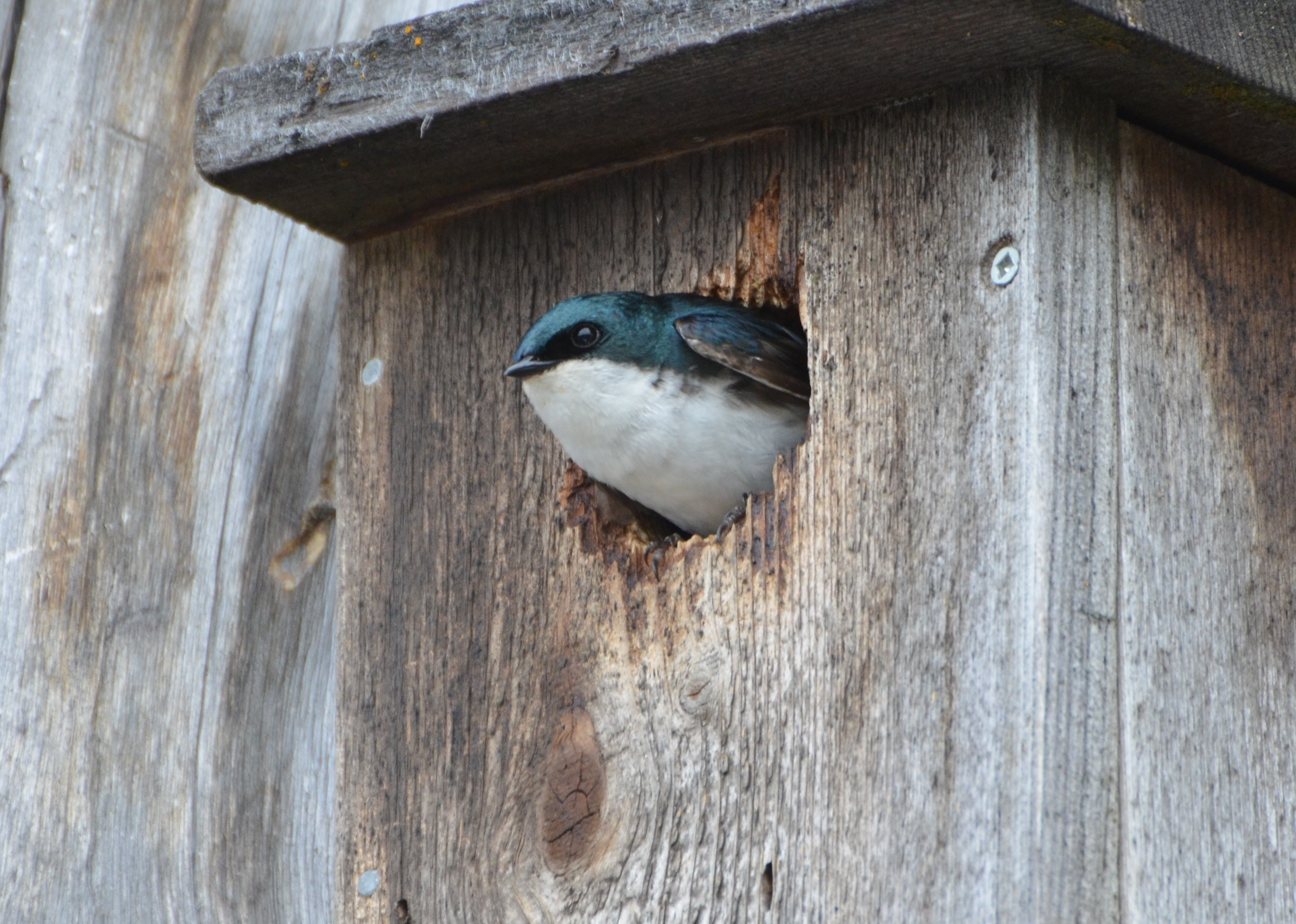

The tree swallow (Tachycineta bicolor) is also an effective predator of Haematobia irritans and can be attracted by building tree-swallow houses spaced approximately 100 feet apart. Each adult tree swallow will consume about 2,000 insects per day during an average 45 day nesting period. The parents also catch and feed their brood (of 4-7 nestlings) about 6,000 insects per day during an average 20 days spent inside the nestbox.

Parasitic wasps can reduce fly larvae by 90%. Put out enough wasps to inhibit what's left and put out more wasps every 30 days through summer.

Dung beetles spend their lives in manure. Adults use liquid components as nourishment and lay eggs in the manure pat. The hatching larvae consume manure. Some species remove and bury balls of manure containing their eggs. An active population of dung beetles can bury or destroy 95% of horn fly eggs and larvae and about 90% of other cattle parasites that are passed in or depend on manure. Even if the fly eggs hatch in the manure balls, they can't get back up to the ground surface after being buried by the dung beetles. What's more, birds are attracted to manure containing dung beetles and tear the pats apart to eat them. This helps spread manure and disrupt fly-larvae development. A single manure pat without dung beetles can generate 60-80 adult horn flies.

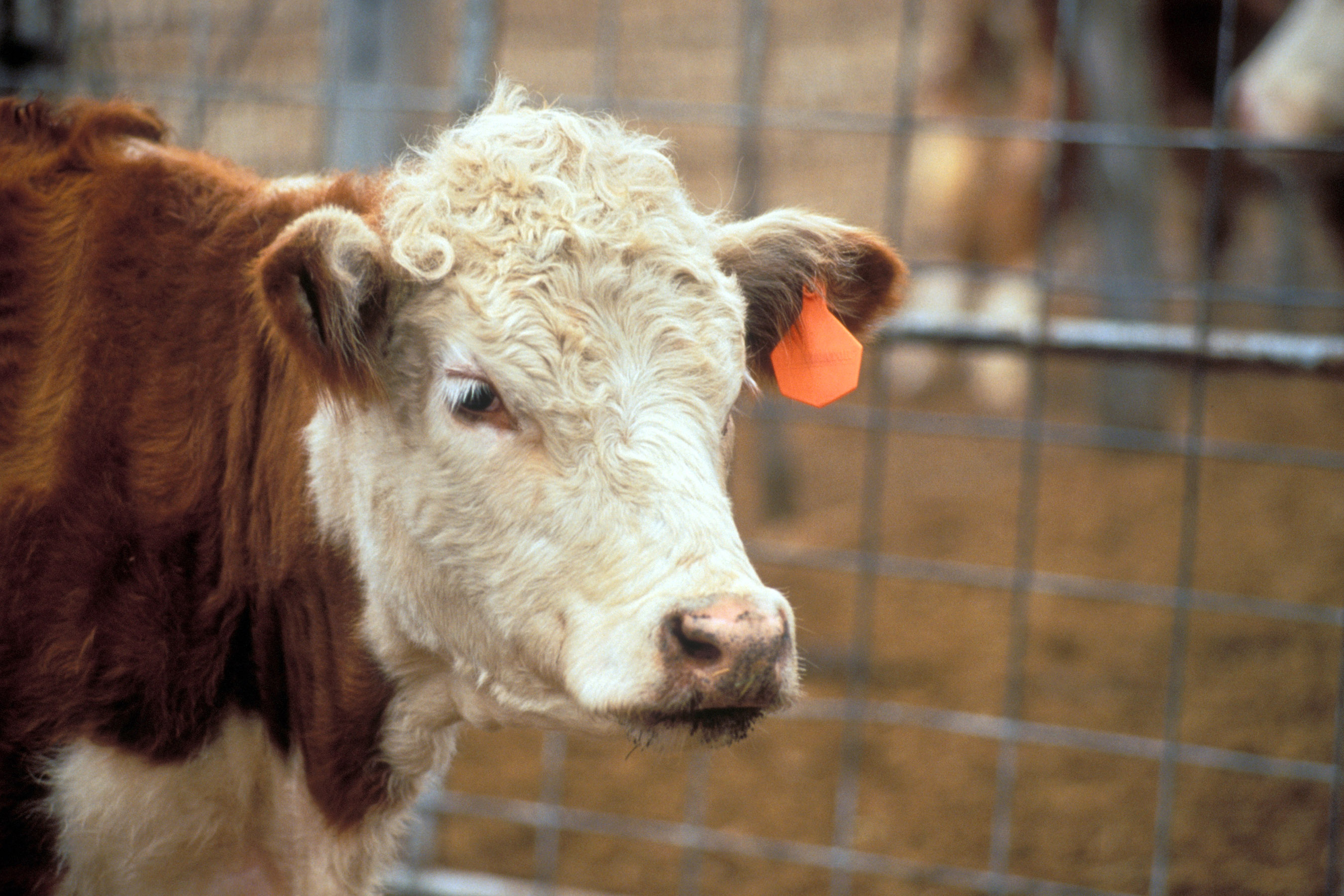
Insecticidal eartag

Chemical methods have included pour-ons, backrubbers and face powder bags, with products such as Co-Ral which is available as dust for face/horn flies. Self-applicator methods such as dust bags and backrubbers are used mainly for range or pasture herds, and are placed so that the animal cannot avoid coming into contact with it, such as at a gate through which animals pass. More recently, control of the horn fly by using ear tags on cattle has been extremely successful. The ear tags are made of a PVC matrix impregnated with pyrethroid, and can be effective for between 16 and 24 weeks. Originally, the ear tags were developed and used against such pests as ticks and by 1983 50% of cattle had ear tags. long periods of such dosing resulted in the elimination of 95-99% of susceptible flies, but this strong selective pressure ended up resulting in the development of resistant strains of the flies. To combat this, the use of organophosphates and piperonyl butoxide as a synergist are now recommended to be alternated with pyrethroid to help slow resistance. In addition, methoprene in the form of sustained release bolus (a rounded mass of food or pharmaceutical preparation ready to swallow) inhibits the emergence of an adult insect from a pupal case or an insect larva from an egg for up to 7 months. New research (2011) has shown essential oil vapors from 16 species of eucalyptus to have toxicity against Haematobia irritans.

== Mutations and known variations ==
A white-eyed "albino" horn fly was discovered in a colony maintained at the Knipling-Bushland U.S. Livestock Insects Research Laboratory in Kerrville, Texas. This is apparently a spontaneous mutation, as tests including crosses were performed that determined the white-eye mutation was not sex-linked and the white-eyed flies actually have decreased amounts of eye pigment present within the head. This appears to be an inherited simple Mendelian autosomal recessive with complete penetrance. A colony of white-eyed horn flies was established from this single individual and has been maintained in the laboratory as visible genetic markers such as an eye color mutation in an economically important species like the horn fly may be useful for behavior and population dynamic studies, as well as release and recapture studies. No other differences from the wild-type flies were detected in the external characteristics of the mutant phenotype or in egg viability. However, white-eyed flies had significantly lower amounts of the pigment dihydroxyxanthommatin in their heads suggesting either the lack of xanthommatin production, or a failure of transport and storage within the head of the mutant phenotype.

== Genomics ==
The insecticide susceptible Kerrville reference strain horn fly genome was assembled by the USDA-ARS Knipling-Bushland US Livestock Insects Research Laboratory in 2018. The assembled size of the horn fly genome is 1.14 Gb which was close to previously published estimates using flow cytometry (1.2 Gb). This makes the horn fly genome larger than the genome sizes of the related Muscidae flies Musca domestica and Stomoxys calcitrans, which were reported as 1.0 Gb and 1.1 Gb. In addition to the nuclear genome of the Kerrville reference strain, the maternally inherited endosymbiont Wolbachia pipientis wIrr has also been assembled.

== Notes ==
- Kansas State Research and Information
- Robert Hutchinson's Insects of Veterinary Importance
- University of São Paulo, Veterinary Parasitology
- Lohmeyer, K. H.; Kammlah, D. M. & Pruett Jr, J. H. (2006). "White eye color mutant in Haematobia irritans (Diptera: Muscidae)". Annals of the Entomological Society of America. 99 (5): 966–8. doi:10.1603/0013-8746(2006)99[966:WECMIH]2.0.CO;2. ISSN 0013-8746.
- Guglielmone AA, Gimeno E, Idiart J, et al. (July 1999). "Skin lesions and cattle hide damage from Haematobia irritans infestations". Med. Vet. Entomol. 13 (3): 324–9. doi:10.1046/j.1365-2915.1999.00167.x. PMID 10514060. S2CID 23511203.
