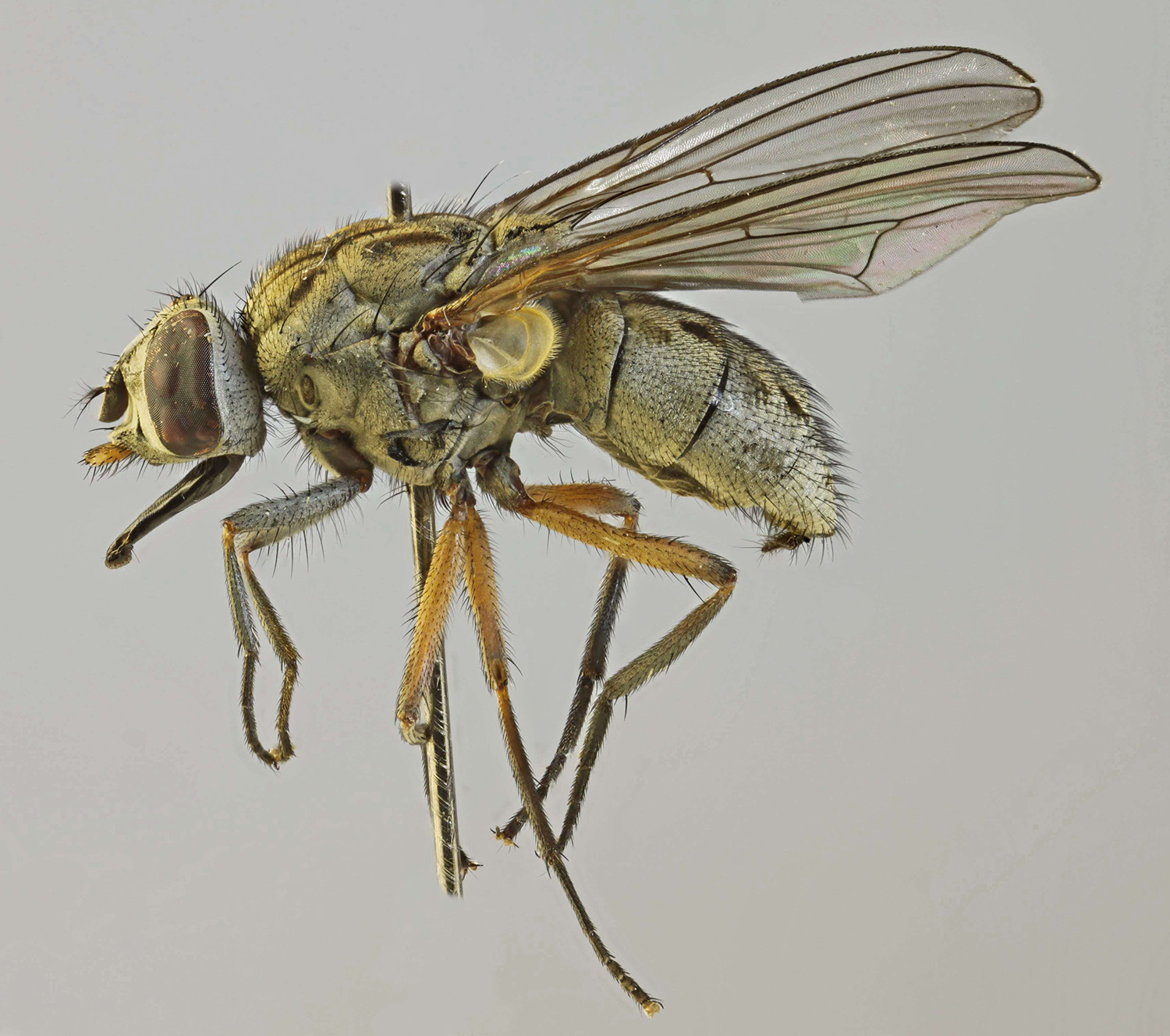

Scientific classification
- Kingdom: Animalia
- Phylum: Arthropoda
- Clade: Pancrustacea
- Class: Insecta
- Order: Diptera
- Family: Muscidae
- Tribe: Stomoxyini
- Genus: Haematobosca
- Species: H. stimulans

Binomial name
- Haematobosca stimulans (Meigen, 1824)

Synonyms
- Stomoxys stimulans Meigen, 1824

= Haematobosca stimulans =

Species of fly

Haematobosca stimulans is a fly from the family Muscidae. It is an ectoparasite which feeds on the blood of mammals.

== Description ==
See Morphology of Diptera for terms. The proboscis is of the blood-sucking type, strongly sclerotised, at least as long as head, without distinct labella. The lower squama is broadly rounded at the apex, its inner margin strongly diverging from scutellum throughout. The palpi are much more than half as long as the mentum. The hypopleuronis bare. The subcostal vein is setulose. Notopleuron hairy. Length 5-6·5 mm.

== Biology ==
Eggs are laid in almost fresh cow-dung. The larvae are trimorphic and leave the egg in the first instar and may reach maturity without resorting to carnivory. Adults are found around cattle on which they feed, and in farm buildings such as milking parlours etc. Flight from May to October.
