= Moose-fly =

Moose-fly may refer to:

- Hybomitra affinis
- Haematobosca alcis
