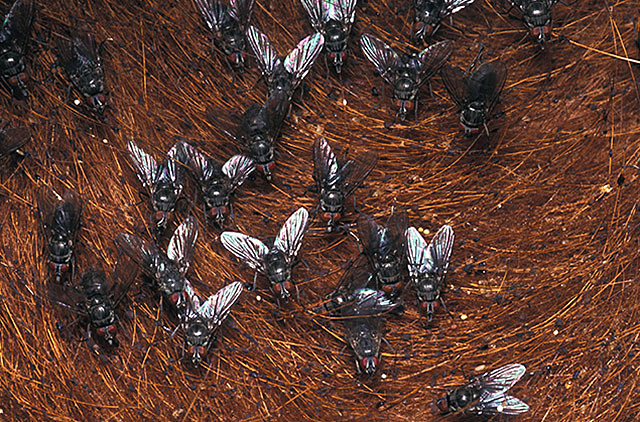
- Haematobia irritans

Scientific classification
- Kingdom: Animalia
- Phylum: Arthropoda
- Class: Insecta
- Order: Diptera
- Family: Muscidae
- Tribe: Stomoxyini
- Genus: Haematobia; Le Peletier & Serville, 1828

Type species
- Conops irritans Linnaeus, 1758

Synonyms
- Lyperosia Rondani, 1856; Hoematobia Bigot, 1892

= Haematobia =

Genus of flies

Haematobia is a genus of biting true flies of the family Muscidae.

== Species ==
- H. exigua Meijere, 1906
- H. irritans (Linnaeus, 1758)
- H. minuta (Bezzi, 1892)
- H. potans (Bezzi, 1907)
- H. schillingsi (Grünberg, 1906)
- H. spinigera Malloch, 1932
- H. thirouxi (Roubaud, 1906)
- H. titillans (Bezzi, 1907)
