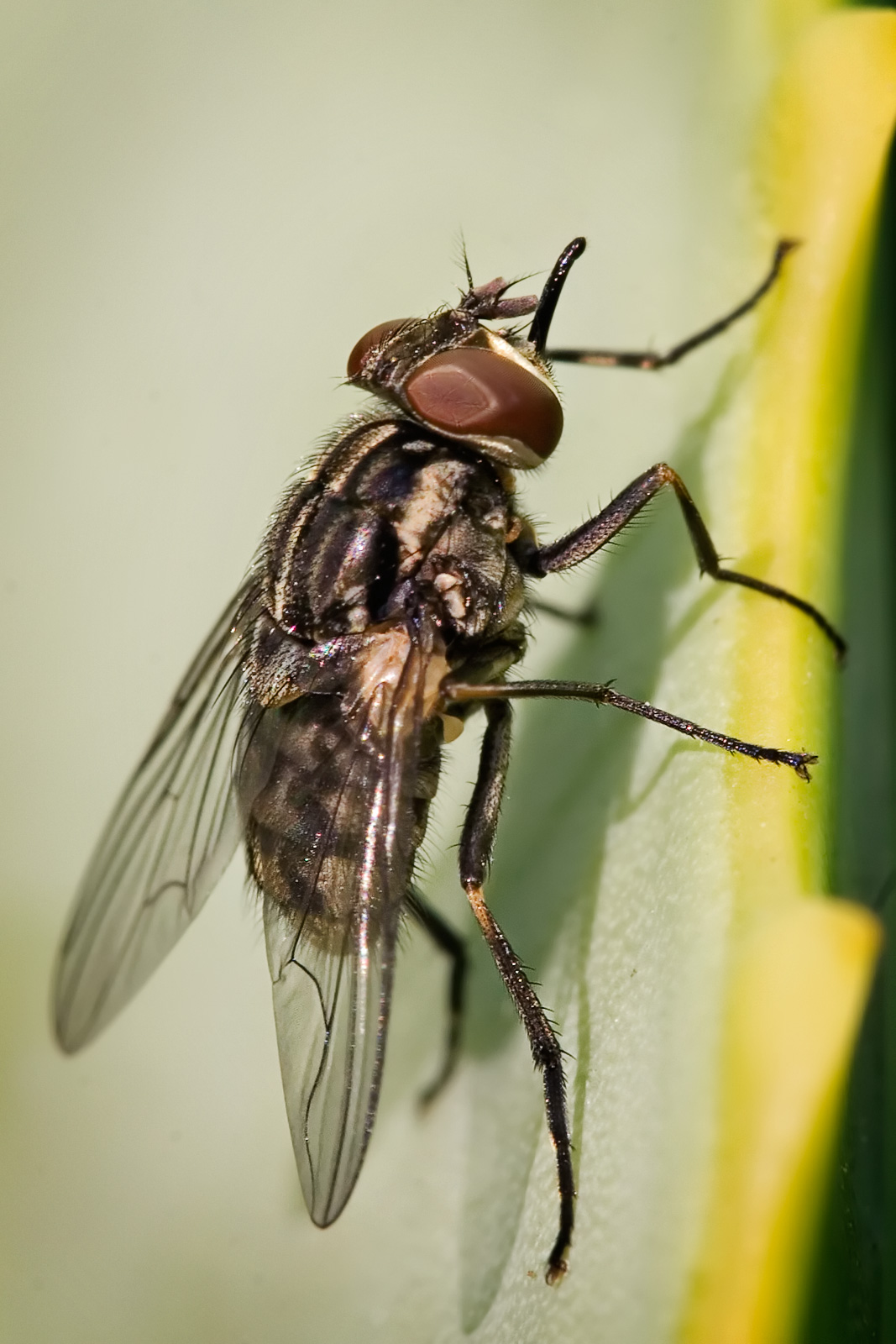

Scientific classification
- Kingdom: Animalia
- Phylum: Arthropoda
- Clade: Pancrustacea
- Class: Insecta
- Order: Diptera
- Family: Muscidae
- Tribe: Stomoxyini
- Genus: Stomoxys
- Species: S. calcitrans

Binomial name
- Stomoxys calcitrans (Linnaeus, 1758)

Synonyms
- Conops calcitrans Linnaeus, 1758; Musca occidentis Walker, 1853; Stomoxis dira Robineau-Desvoidy, 1830; Stomoxis inimica Robineau-Desvoidy, 1830; Stomoxys cybira Walker, 1849; Stomoxys parasita Fabricius, 1781

= Stable fly =

Species of fly

Stomoxys calcitrans is known by the common names stable fly, barn fly, biting house fly, dog fly, and power mower fly. Unlike most members of the family Muscidae, Stomoxys calcitrans ('sharp mouth' + 'kicking') and others of its genus suck blood from mammals. Now found worldwide, the species is considered to be of Eurasian or African origin.

== Physical features ==
The stable fly resembles the common housefly (Musca domestica), though smaller, and on closer examination has a slightly wider and spotted abdomen. Adults are generally about 6–8 mm (1/4–5/16 inch) in length and a lighter color than the housefly. Unlike the housefly, where the mouth part is adapted for sponging, the stable fly mouth parts have biting structures. An additional distinction from M. domestica is in the aristae, which bear a single, superior row of hairs in S. calcitrans instead of two opposing rows.

== Habitat ==
As its name suggests, the stable fly is abundant in and around where cattle are kept. Its maggots are often seen in the rotting manure near cattle and poultry. It also occurs in coastal areas where larvae may inhabit masses of decaying aquatic vegetation deposited ashore.

== Biology ==
Stomoxys calcitrans expelling waste.

The earliest and one of the most comprehensive accounts of stable fly biology was presented by F. Bishopp in 1913. The adults of both sexes feed on the blood of warm-blooded animals during the daytime. For egg production, the female requires its abdomen to be engorged with blood. The female takes approximately 2–5 minutes to engorge, after which it becomes sluggish for a while. The eggs are laid among putrefying organic materials such as hay, manure, and wood. Males usually die after mating and the females after laying eggs. The life cycle has a duration of about two weeks at temperatures around 27 °C (81 °F). The duration is highly dependent on temperature and nutrient quality available for the larvae. Bishopp (1913) noted that the larvae can endure for more than 30 days in less nutritious environs.

== Economic impact ==
Cattle heavily infested with stable flies have been noted to become anemic and milking cows have been observed to show lower milk production. The stable fly bites humans at rest in the outdoors. In many parts of the world, the species is a carrier of trypanosomid parasites. Some of the reported parasites and diseases for which the stable fly might be a vector include Trypanosoma evansi (the agent of Surra), Trypanosoma brucei, brucellosis, equine infectious anemia, African horse sickness (AHS), Lumpy skin disease (LSD) and fowlpox. S. calcitrans is also reported to be a vector of Bacillus anthracis, the causative agent of anthrax.

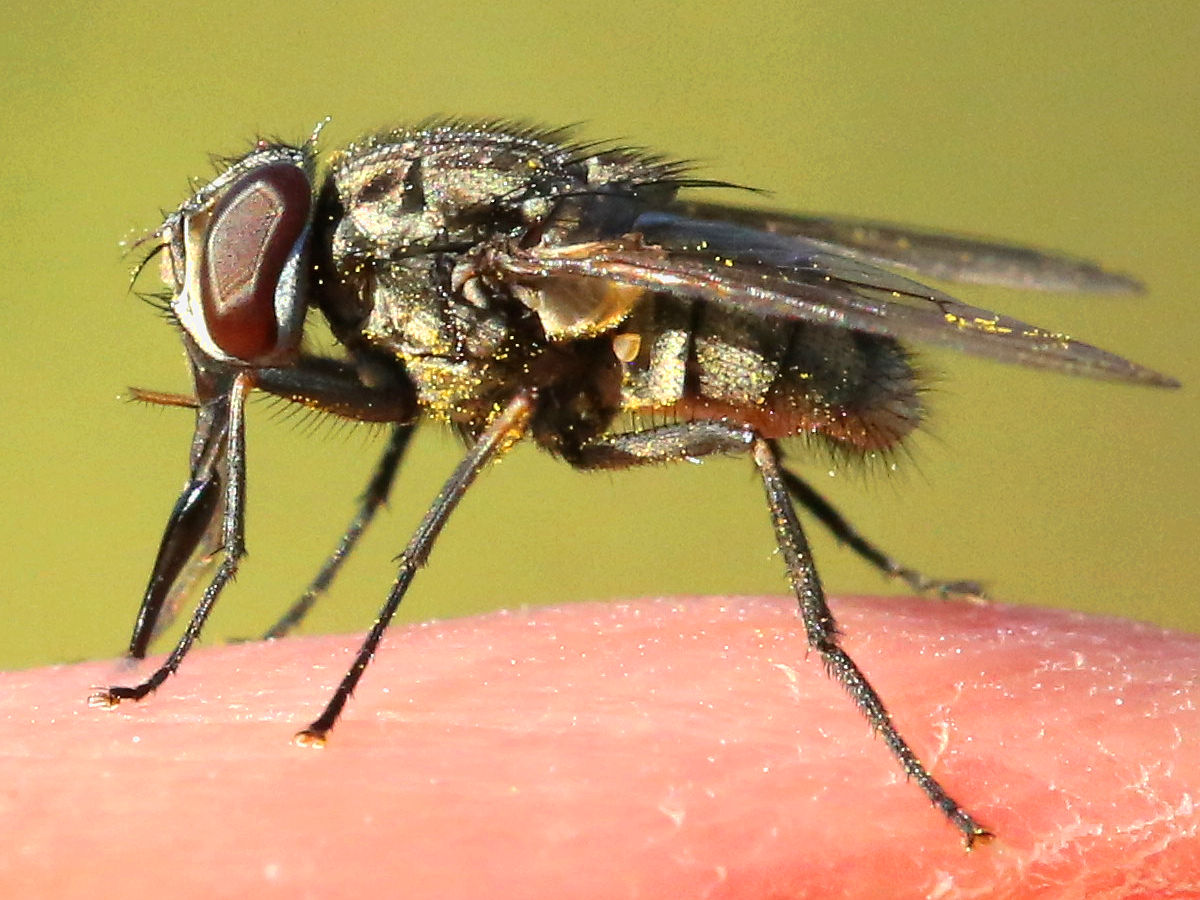
Sucking human blood
