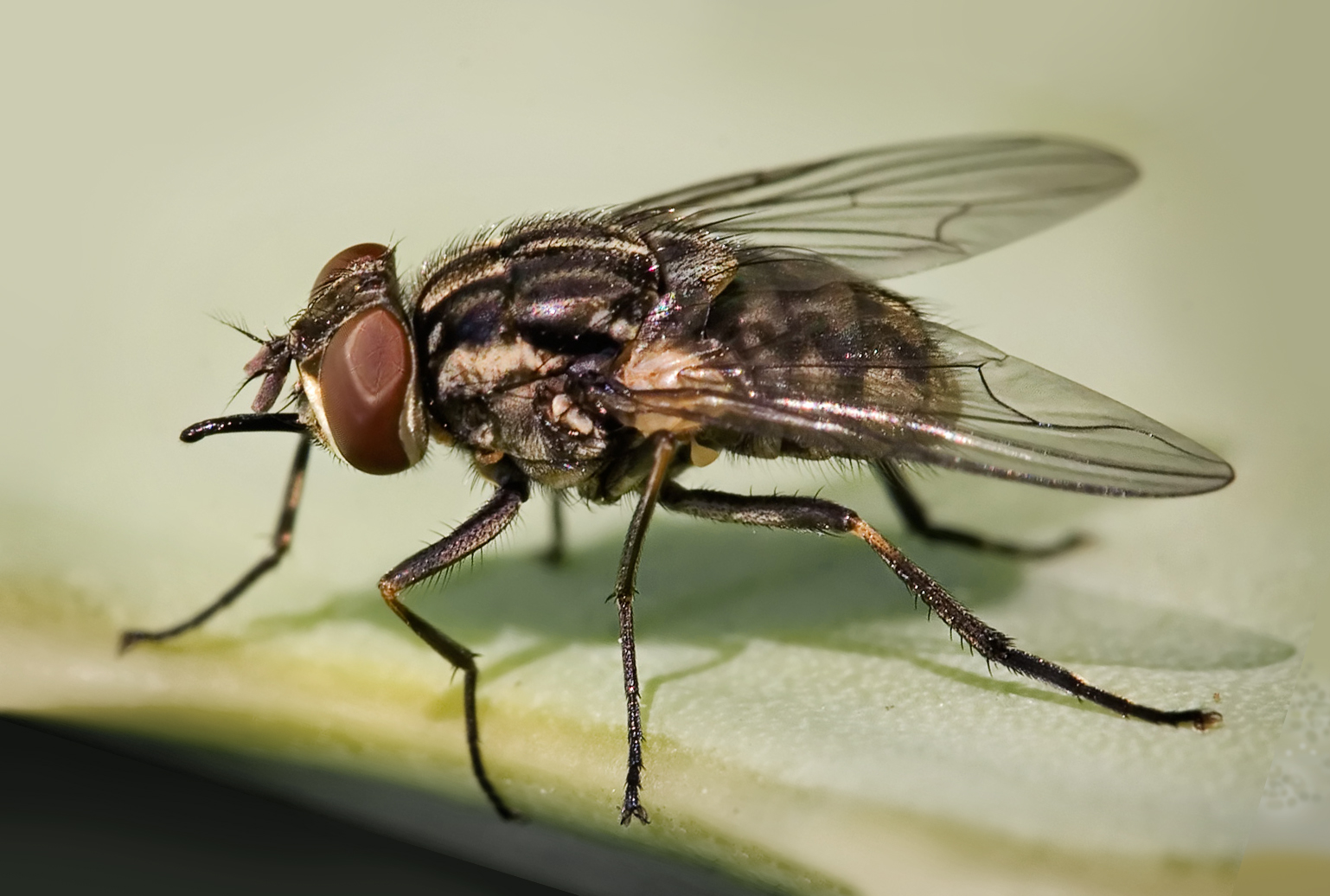
- Stomoxys calcitrans

Scientific classification
- Kingdom: Animalia
- Phylum: Arthropoda
- Clade: Pancrustacea
- Class: Insecta
- Order: Diptera
- Family: Muscidae
- Tribe: Stomoxyini
- Genus: Stomoxys; Geoffroy, 1762

Type species
- Conops calcitrans Linnaeus, 1758

Species
- See text

Synonyms
- Stomoxis Schäffer, 1766

= Stomoxys =

Genus of flies

Stomoxys is a genus of flies in the family Muscidae. The genus is unusual among the Muscidae in that it includes species that are bloodsucking ectoparasites of mammals. The best-known species is Stomoxys calcitrans, most commonly known as the stable fly.

The genus is small, comprising a dozen or two described species, and current evidence suggests that it is paraphyletic as well.

== Species ==
- S. bengalensis Picard, 1908
- S. bilineatus Grünberg, 1906
- S. boueti Roubaud, 1911
- S. calcitrans (Linnaeus, 1758)
- S. indicus Picard, 1908
- S. inornatus Grünberg, 1906
- S. luteolus Villeneuve, 1934
- S. niger Macquart, 1851
- S. ochrosoma Speiser, 1910
- S. omega Newstead, Dutton & Todd, 1907
- S. pallidus Roubaud, 1911
- S. pullus Austen, 1909
- S. sitiens Rondani, 1873
- S. stigma Emden, 1939
- S. taeniatus Bigot, 1888
- S. transvittatus Villeneuve, 1916
- S. uruma Shinonaga & Kano, 1966
- S. varipes Bezzi, 1907
- S. xanthomelas Roubaud, 1937
