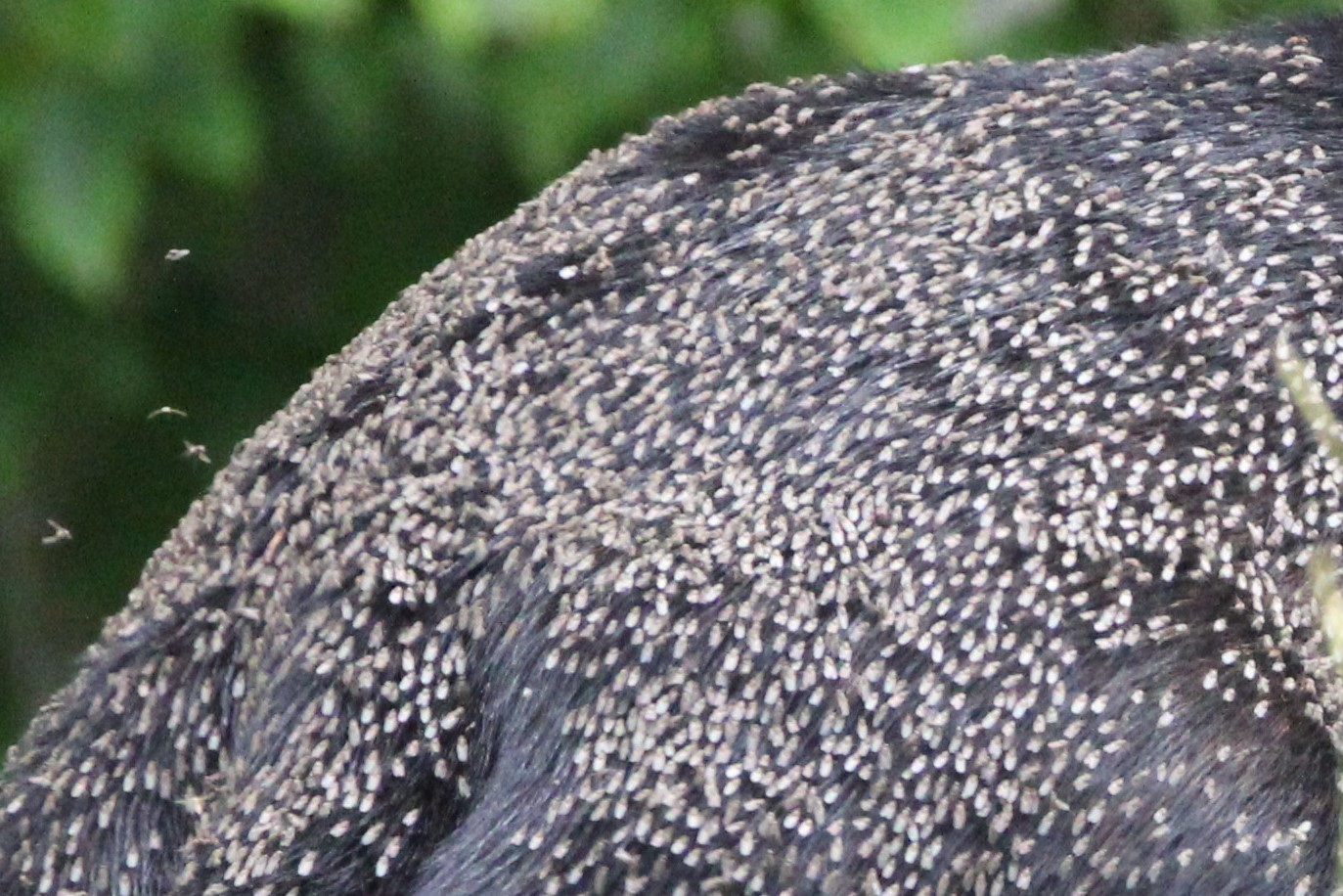

Scientific classification
- Kingdom: Animalia
- Phylum: Arthropoda
- Class: Insecta
- Order: Diptera
- Family: Muscidae
- Tribe: Stomoxyini
- Genus: Haematobosca
- Species: H. alcis

Binomial name
- Haematobosca alcis (Snow, 1891)

Synonyms
- Haematobia alcis Snow, 1891

= Haematobosca alcis =

Species of insect

Haematobosca alcis, the moose fly, is a species of blood-feeding muscid in the family Muscidae. It is found in North America and is abundant in Yellowstone National Park.
