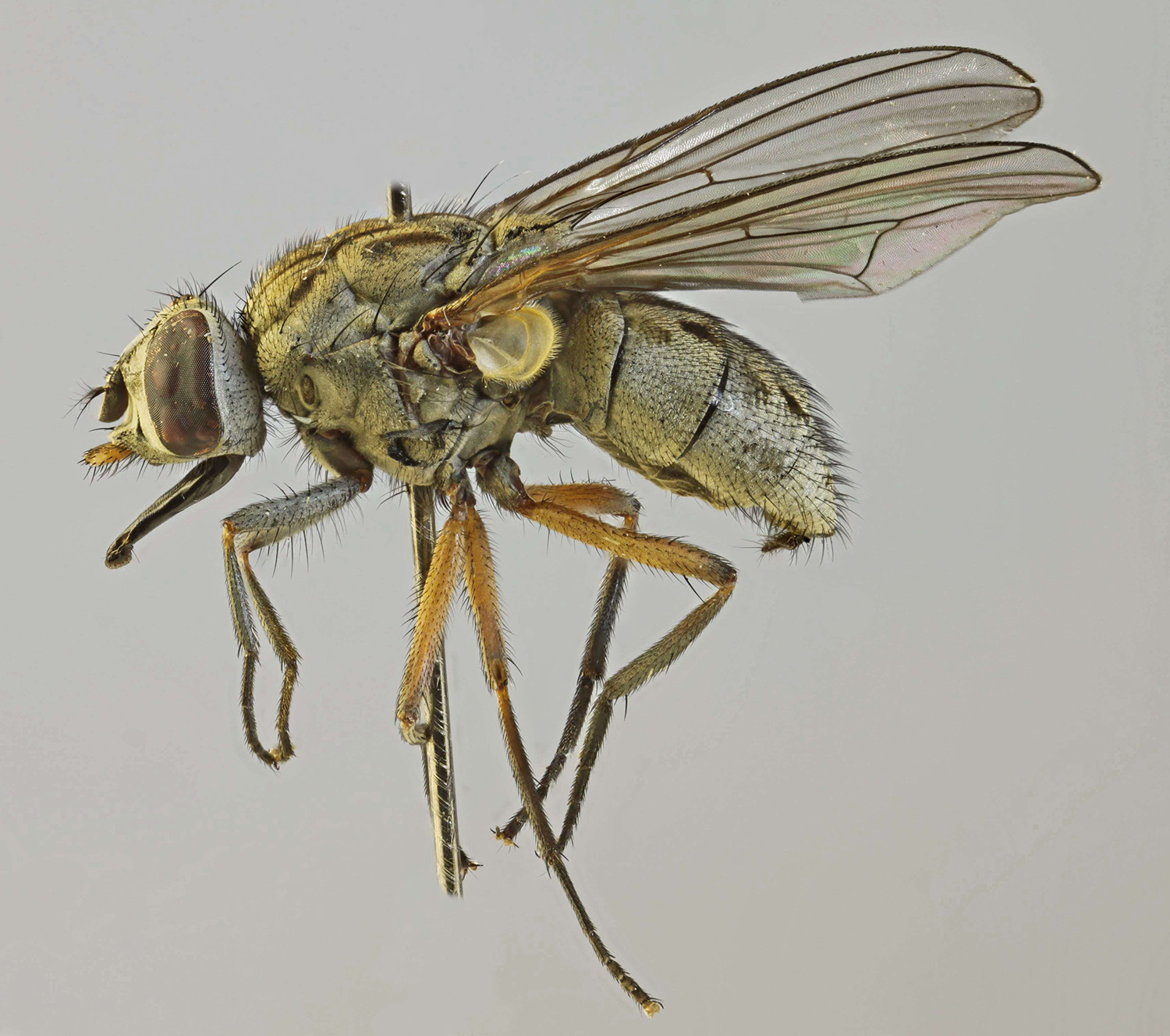
- Haematobosca stimulans

Scientific classification
- Kingdom: Animalia
- Phylum: Arthropoda
- Clade: Pancrustacea
- Class: Insecta
- Order: Diptera
- Family: Muscidae
- Subfamily: Muscinae
- Tribe: Stomoxyini
- Genus: Haematobosca; Bezzi, 1907

Type species
- Haematobia atripalpis Bezzi, 1907

Synonyms
- Bdellia Enderlein, 1928; Bdellolarynx Austen, 1909; Lyperosiops Townsend, 1912; Haematobina Malloch, 1932

= Haematobosca =

Genus of flies

Haematobosca is a genus of biting true flies of the family Muscidae.

== Species ==
- H. atripalpis (Bezzi, 1895)
- H. aurata Pont & Mihok, 2000
- H. croceicornis Pont & Dsouri, 2009
- H. praedatrix (Enderlein, 1928)
- H. augustifrons (Malloch, 1932)
- H. hirtifrons (Malloch, 1932)
- H. latifrons (Malloch, 1932)
- H. sanguinolenta (Austen, 1909)
- H. uniseriata (Malloch, 1932)
- H. alcis (Snow, 1891)
- H. atripalpis (Bezzi, 1895)
- H. sanguisugens (Austen, 1909)
- H. squalida (Grünberg, 1913)
- H. wooffi (Zumpt, 1969)
- H. zuluensis (Zumpt, 1950)
- H. kangwagyei (Zumpt, 1967)
- H. ryszardi (Draber-Monko, 1966)
- H. stimulans (Meigen, 1824)
