= Médecine Tropicale et Santé Internationale =

- Discipline: Tropical diseases, international health
- Language: French

Publication details
- Former name(s): Bulletin de la Société de Pathologie Exotique
- History: Founded in 1908, renamed in 2021
- Publisher: Société francophone de médecine tropicale et santé internationale (France)
- License: CC-BY 4.0

Standard abbreviations
- ISO 4: Méd. Trop. Santé Int.

Indexing
- ISSN: 2778-2034

The Bulletin de la Société de Pathologie Exotique was a multi-disciplinary French-language journal specializing in tropical diseases, and it accepted manuscripts not only from physicians, but also from biologists, veterinarians, social scientists and other researchers.

It was founded in 1908 by Alphonse Laveran, who discovered the cause of malaria to be a protozoan parasite, and the journal was published by the Société de pathologie exotique.

In 2021, the society behind the journal renamed itself to Société francophone de médecine tropicale et santé internationale (Francophone Society of Tropical Medicine and International Health, SFMTSI), and the journal also received a new name, Médecine Tropicale et Santé Internationale. The new journal is only published online, and its content is freely available under the CC-BY license.

== Sources ==
- Chippaux, J. P.; Epelboin, A.; Gazin, P.; Pays, J. F. (2020). "Le Bulletin change de nom et de formule" [The Bulletin changes its name and its model]. Bulletin de la Société de Pathologie Exotique (in French). 113 (5): 249–250. doi:10.3166/bspe-2021-0157. PMID 33881250.
