= Émile Roubaud =

French biologist and entomologist

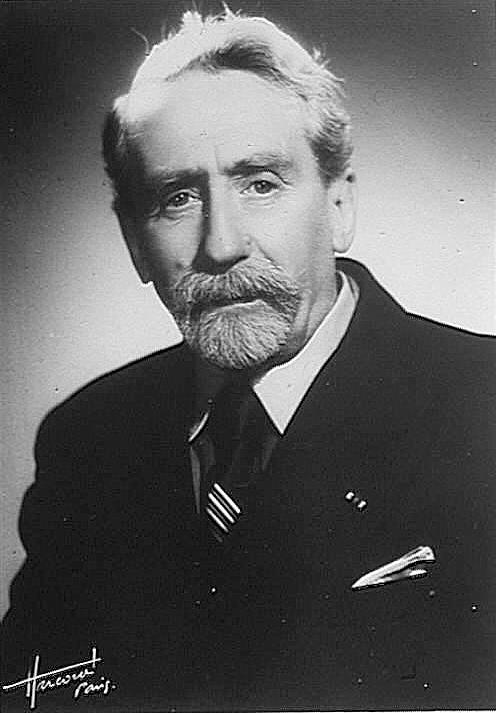
Émile Roubaud (1882–1962)

Émile Roubaud (2 March 1882 in Paris – 30 September 1962 in Paris) was a French biologist and entomologist known for his work on paludism, yellow fever and sleeping sickness.

== Biography ==
In 1906-08 he worked in the French Congo, where he studied the transmission of trypanosomiasis and the role of tsetse flies. In 1909-12 he took part in a mission in Senegal, Casamance and Dahomey, where he performed research of animal trypanosomiasis. On this mission he conducted geographical distribution studies of nine tsetse fly species.

In 1920, he and Félix Mesnil achieved the first experimental infection of chimpanzees with Plasmodium vivax.

He made his career at Pasteur Institute — from 1914 to 1958 he was director of a research laboratory for medical entomology and pest biology at the institute. Here, he also taught classes in medical entomology.

He was president of the Société entomologique de France in 1927 and a member of the French Academy of Sciences in 1938. In 1936 he was named president of the Société de pathologie exotique. He is a recipient of the Montyon Prize.

== Selected works ==
- La Glossina palpalis, sa biologie, son rôle dans l'étiologie des Trypanosomiases, 1909 (doctoral thesis); Glossina palpalis, its biology, its role involving the etiology of trypanosomiasis.
- La maladie du sommeil au Congo français, 1909 (in collaboration with G. Martin and A. Lebœuf) – Sleeping sickness in the French Congo.
- Études sur la faune parasitique de l’Afrique occidentale française, 1914 – Studies of parasitic fauna in French West Africa.

== See also ==
- History of malaria

== Sources ==
- C. Toumanoff (1962). "Nécrologie d'Émile Roubaud". Bulletin de la Société de pathologie exotique. (French)
