= Stephanofilaria =

Scientific classification
- Kingdom: Animalia
- Phylum: Nematoda
- Class: Chromadorea
- Order: Rhabditida
- Family: Filariidae
- Genus: Stephanofilaria; Ihle & Ihle-Landenberg, 1933

Species
- Stephanofilaria andamani; Stephanofilaria assamensis Pande, 1936; Stephanofilaria boomkeri Bain, van der Lugt & Kazadi, 1996; Stephanofilaria dedoesi Ihle & Ihle-Landenberg, 1933; Stephanofilaria dinniki Round, 1964; Stephanofilaria jaheeri; Stephanofilaria kaeli Buckley, 1937; Stephanofilaria okinawaensis Ueno & Chibana, 1977; Stephanofilaria srivastavai; Stephanofilaria stilesi Chitwood, 1934; Stephanofilaria thelazioides Boomker, Bain, Chabaud & Kriek, 1995; Stephanofilaria zaheeri Singh, 1958

Genus of nematode worms

Stephanofilaria is a genus of nematode worms in the family Filariidae. They are known to cause chronic dermatitis in cattle.
