= Stephanofilaria stilesi =

Scientific classification
- Kingdom: Animalia
- Phylum: Nematoda
- Class: Chromadorea
- Order: Rhabditida
- Family: Filariidae
- Genus: Stephanofilaria
- Species: S. stilesi

Binomial name
- Stephanofilaria stilesi Chitwood, 1934

Species of filarial worm

Stephanofilaria stilesi is a species of filarial worm. It is a parasite of cattle. It causes the disease stephanofilariasis.
