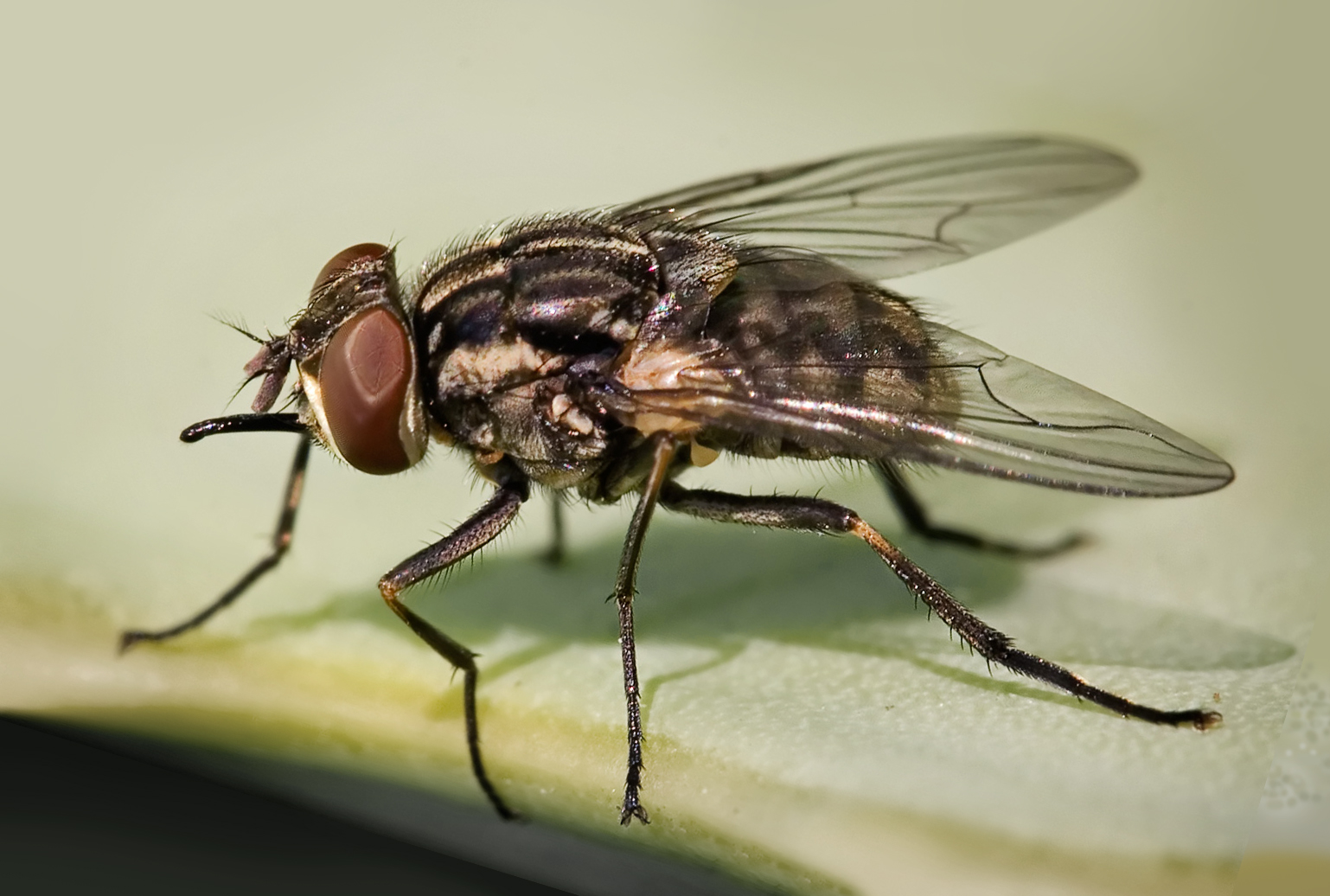
- Stomoxys calcitrans

Scientific classification
- Kingdom: Animalia
- Phylum: Arthropoda
- Clade: Pancrustacea
- Class: Insecta
- Order: Diptera
- Family: Muscidae
- Subfamily: Muscinae
- Tribe: Stomoxyini; Meigen, 1824

= Stomoxyini =

Tribe of flies

Stomoxyini is a tribe of flies from the family Muscidae.

== Genera ==
- Bruceomyia Malloch, 1932
- Haematobia Le Peletier & Serville, 1828
- Haematobosca Bezzi, 1907
- Neivamyia Pinto & Fonseca, 1930
- Parastomoxys Zumpt, 1973
- Prostomoxys Zumpt, 1973
- Rhinomusca Malloch, 1932
- Stomoxys Geoffroy, 1762
- Stygeromyia Austen, 1907
