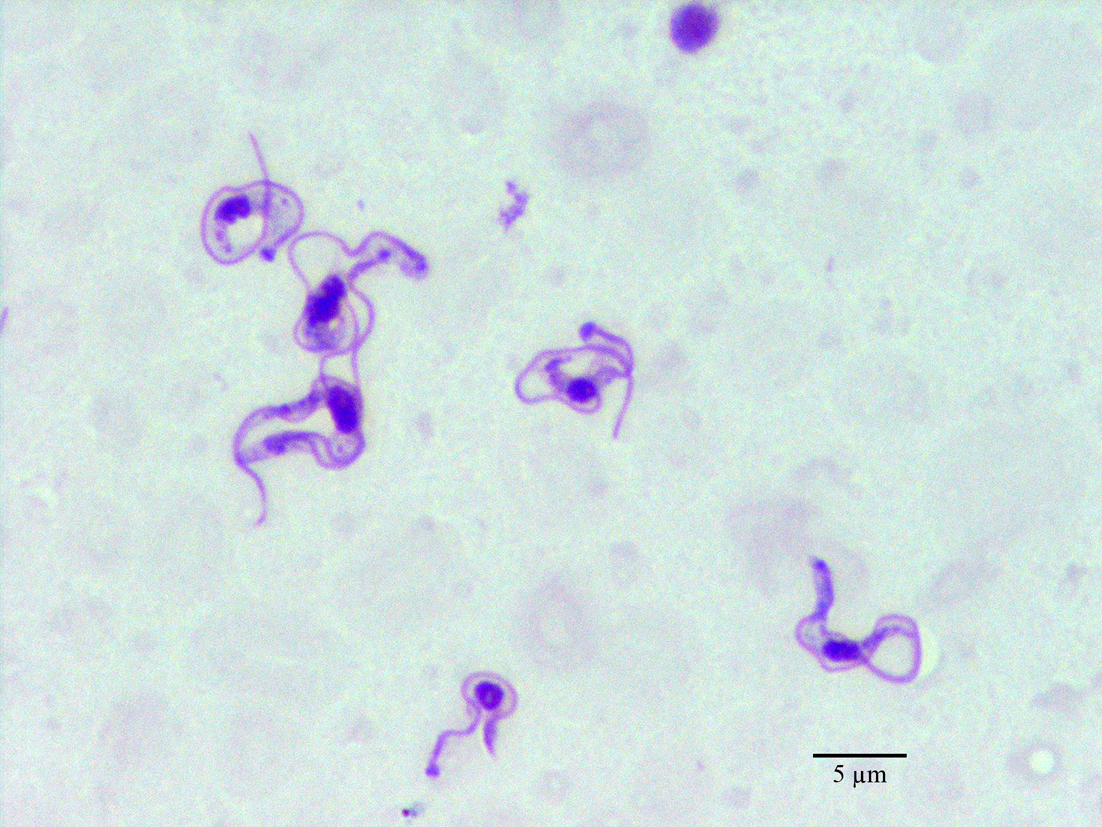

Scientific classification
- Domain: Eukaryota
- Clade: Discoba
- Phylum: Euglenozoa
- Class: Kinetoplastea
- Order: Trypanosomatida
- Family: Trypanosomatidae
- Genus: Trypanosoma
- Species: T. brucei
- Subspecies: T. b. evansi

Trinomial name
- Trypanosoma brucei evansi (Steel) Chauvrat 1896

Synonyms
- Trypanosoma evansi (Steel) Chauvrat 1896

= Trypanosoma brucei evansi =

Contagious protist

Trypanosoma brucei evansi is a subspecies of the parasitic species T. brucei of excavate trypanosome in the genus Trypanosoma that is one cause of surra in animals. Discovered by Griffith Evans in 1880 at Dera Ismail Khan (British India), it is the first known trypanosome that causes infection. It is a common parasite in India and Iran and causes acute disease in camels and horses, and chronic disease in cattle and buffalo. In Pakistan, it has been found to be the most prevalent trypanosome species in donkeys. It is now established to infect other mammals, including humans.

It has been proposed that T. b. evansi is—like T. b. equiperdum—a derivative of T. brucei. Due to the loss of part of the mitochondrial (kinetoplast) DNA T. b. evansi is not capable of infecting tsetse flies, the usual invertebrate vectors of trypanosomes, and establishing the subsequent life-stages. Due to its mechanical transmission T. b. evansi shows a very broad vector specificity including members of the genera Tabanus, Stomoxys, Haematopota, Chrysops and Lyperosia. It rarely causes disease in humans, but human infections are common. Haemoglobin plays a role in trypanolytic host defense against T. b. evansi.

== History ==
T. b. evansi was a parasite that caused severe, often fatal, infection in mammals such as horses, donkeys, cattle and camels. In India, where it was prevalent from ancient times, the disease was known as surra. Under the British rule, it caused serious impediment to the British Army, as their horses were infected. In August 1880, Griffith Evans of the Royal Army Service Corps was deployed to investigate the case at army base in Dera Ismail Khan (now in Pakistan). He immediately recognised worm-like parasites from the blood samples of all diseased horses. He reported in 1881:

When I first saw it [the parasite] I thought for a moment it was some form of spirillum [a kind of bacteria], but the next instant convinced me it was not... It has an apparently round body, when it is fresh and active, which tapers in front to a neck ending in a blunt head, and behind it has a tapering tail from which there extends a long slender lash [this now known as the flagella, and is located towards the anterior end, not at the "tail"], so fine that it can seldom be seen... I came to the conclusion that it has two fin-like papillae on each side, one near where the neck commences and another near where the tail begins [now understood to be one undulating membrane, not two, formed by a flagellum].

Griffith experimentally showed that the parasite was the causative pathogen of surra by infecting healthy horses using infected blood. However, the medical authority in British India rejected the idea that the parasite could cause of such disease. Timothy Richards Lewis, Special Assistant to the Sanitary Commissioner, confirmed the parasite but not the connection with the disease. Lewis had discovered a trypanosome (later named Trypanosoma lewisi) of rats in 1878 (reported in 1879). He was convinced that the trypanosome was harmless because he discovered them from only healthy rats. He and David Douglas Cunningham (Professor of Physiology in the Medical College, Calcutta, and Surgeon-General of India), in response to Griffith's observations, officially stated that "no microbe found in the living blood of any animal was pathogenic." It was later recorded in Nature: "Official opinion was strongly against him [Griffith]."

Griffith's discovery was independently established. In 1885, J. H. Steel reported from British Burma (now Myanmar) the same parasites he identified from the blood samples of military transport mules. The similarity of the disease and the parasites to those described by Griffith immediately became obvious. However, Steel mistakenly recognised the parasite was as a type of spirochaete bacteria and named it Spirochaeta evansi, in honour of the discoverer. Edgar Crookshank at King's College London correctly identified it as a kind of protozoan renaming it as Haematonomas evansi, but quickly changed it to Trichomonas evansi in 1885. In 1896, French veterinarian J. Chauvrat gave the correct description and the new name Trypanosoma evansi. The parasite was then established as the first trypanosome that caused disease (trypanosomiasis).

=== Human cases ===
The first human case was reported from Maharashtra, India, in 2005. In 2004, a 45-year-old cattle farmer from Seoni village was hospitalised due to severe fever and disturbed neurological behaviours. Serological, microscopic, and DNA (PCR) test indicated that he was infected with T. b. evansi. The clinical case was confirmed by the World Health Organization. Normally, humans have natural trypanolytic protein called apolipoprotein L1 (APOL1) that kills different species of trypanosomes during infection. The individual was diagnosed to lack APOL1. Serological survey in 2006 in the same region revealed that the infection was already prevalent; 5 to 22% of the population, based on different tests, were found to be positive for T. b. evansi. Outside India, the first human cases were reported from Egypt in 2011. A single case was reported from Vietnam in 2016 in which an infected 38-year-old woman had normal APOL1, indicating that lack of APOL1 is not the primary reason for human infectivity.

== Treatment ==
Suramin is recommended. Isometamidium chloride is ineffective.

=== Trypanocide resistance ===
Trypanosoma brucei evansi trypanocide resistance is widespread. Diminazene aceturate is often ineffective for bovine, equine, porcine, and elephant use in Thailand. Quinapyramine is not recommended for cattle use due to its tendency to produce cross-resistance with both diminazene aceturate and isometamidium chloride. Quinapyramine is recommended for equine and camel use only. For the Philippines blanket treatment of all affected livestock is recommended, while biannual treatment of an individual village's livestock might be more financially realistic but risks developing resistance.

== Range ==
Trypanosoma brucei evansi is rapidly expanding its geographic range. It was historically restricted to Africa but for centuries it has been found in North-East Africa, South Asia, most of East Asia and Latin America. It was first detected in the Canary Islands in 1997 and since 2010 has been imported into Europe, in Germany, France and mainland Spain.
