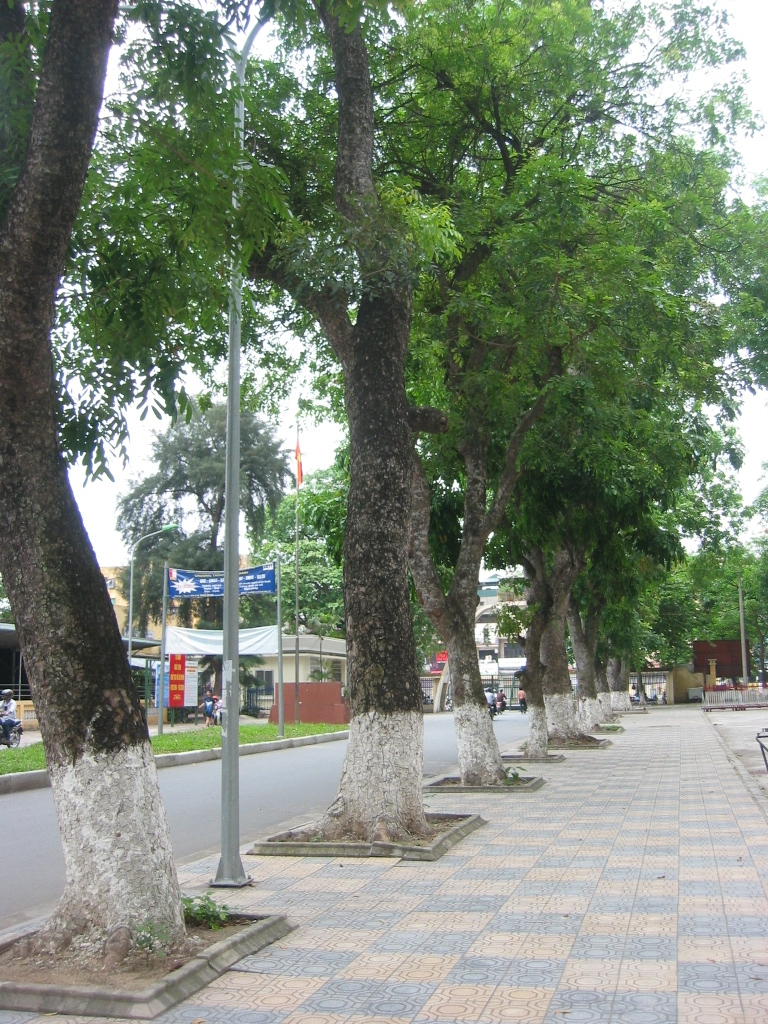
- Khaya senegalensis being used as a street tree in Hanoi, Vietnam

Conservation status
- Vulnerable (IUCN 2.3)

Scientific classification
- Kingdom: Plantae
- Clade: Embryophytes
- Clade: Tracheophytes
- Clade: Angiosperms
- Clade: Eudicots
- Clade: Rosids
- Order: Sapindales
- Family: Meliaceae
- Genus: Khaya
- Species: K. senegalensis

Binomial name
- Khaya senegalensis (Desr.) A.Juss.

= Khaya senegalensis =

Species of tree

Khaya senegalensis is a species of tree in the Meliaceae family that is native to Africa. Common names include African mahogany, dry zone mahogany, Gambia mahogany, khaya wood, Senegal mahogany, cailcedra, acajou, djalla, and bois rouge.

== Description ==
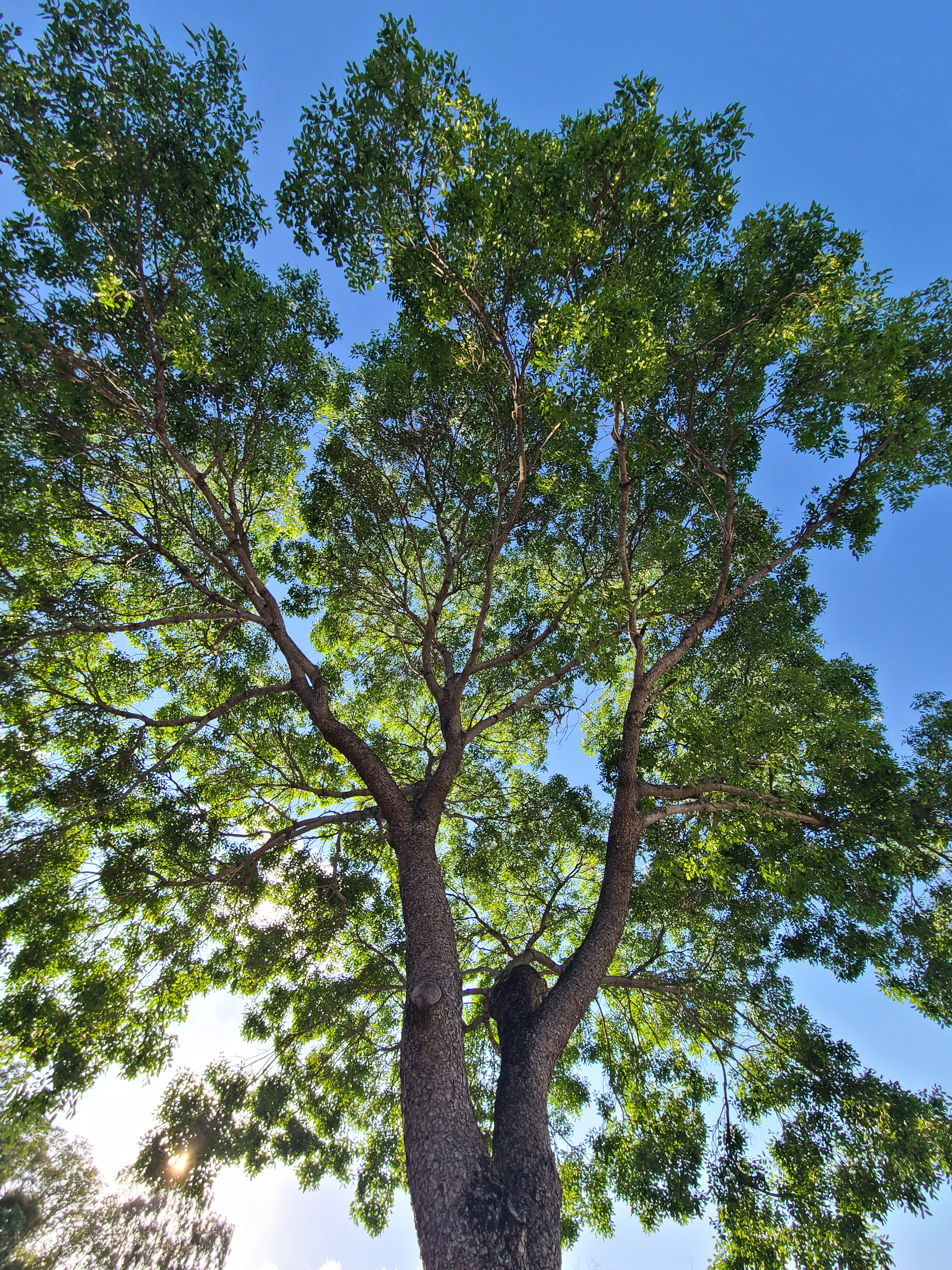
Mature tree next to Fanling Station (Hong Kong)

African mahogany is a fast-growing medium-sized tree which can obtain a height of up to 15–30 m (49–98 ft) in height and 1 m (3 ft 3 in) in diameter. The bark is dark grey to grey-brown while the heartwood is brown with a pink-red pigment made up of coarse interlocking grains. The tree is characterised by leaves arranged in a spiral formation clustered at the end of branches. The white flowers are sweet-scented; the fruit changes from grey to black when ripening.

== Distribution and habitat ==
The tree is native to Benin, Burkina Faso, Cameroon, Central African Republic, Chad, Ivory Coast, Gabon, Gambia, Ghana, Guinea, Guinea-Bissau, Mali, Niger, Nigeria, Senegal, Sierra Leone, Sudan, Togo, and Uganda. It is found in riparian forests and higher-rainfall savannah woodlands; in moist regions, it is found on higher ground. Within its first year, the seedling develops a deep root system that makes it the most drought resistant member of its genus.

== Uses ==
K. senegalensis has been extensively studied for trypanocidal activity. Atawodi et al 2003, Wurochekke and Nok 2004, Mikail 2009, Aderbauer et al 2008, Umar et al 2010, Adeiza et al 2010, Ibrahim et al 2008, and Ibrahim et al 2013a investigate extracts of stem bark both in vitro and in vivo in rats, against T. evansi, T. congolense and T. b. brucei. All showed promising results and a few demonstrated an effective dose.

The wood is used for a variety of purposes, including carpentry (e.g., interior trim) and construction. Traditionally, the wood was used for dugout canoes, household implements, djembe, and fuel.

The bitter tasting bark is used for a variety of medical purposes; it is taken against fever caused by malaria, stomach ailments, and headaches. Applied externally, it is used to treat skin rashes, wounds, and abnormalities.

Ethnobotanical and ethnopharmacological literature has reported use of Khaya senegalensis stem bark in women's reproductive health contexts, including for irregular menstruation. A 2025 randomised, double-blind, placebo-controlled trial (n=84) evaluated K. senegalensis in women experiencing menstrual pain and reported reductions in daily pain ratings and menstrual distress over one menstrual cycle.

It has been exported from West Africa (Gambia) to Europe since the first half of the 19th century and has been exploited heavily for its timber. It is now used more locally, and is planted ornamentally to line roads.

== Conservation and threats ==
K. senegalensis has experienced high amounts of exploitation, and little regeneration takes place once disturbance occurs. Because of this, the IUCN Red List of Threatened Species considers it a vulnerable species. The only conservation which takes place are log export bans and legal protection in some countries.

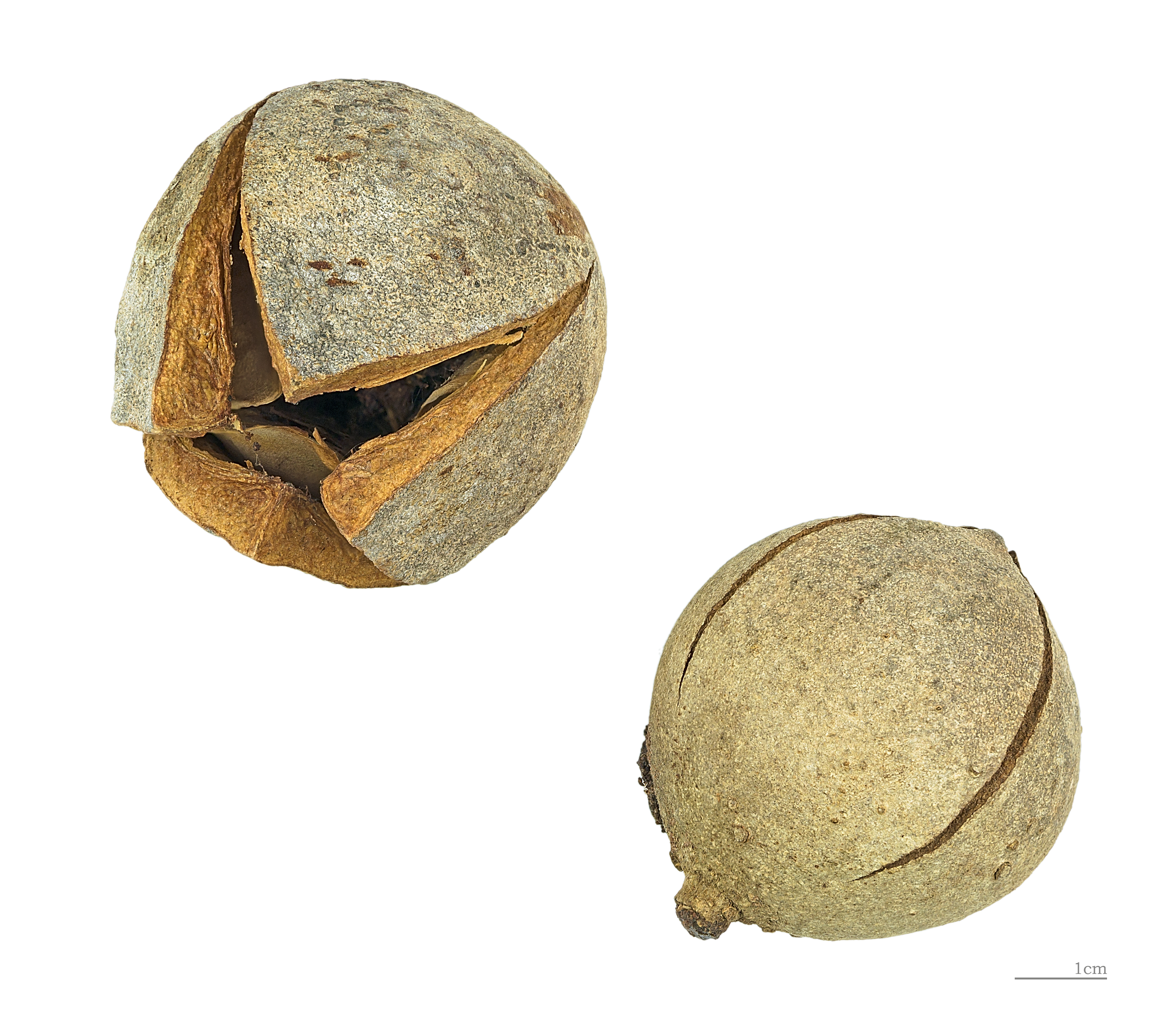
Khaya senegalensis - MHNT

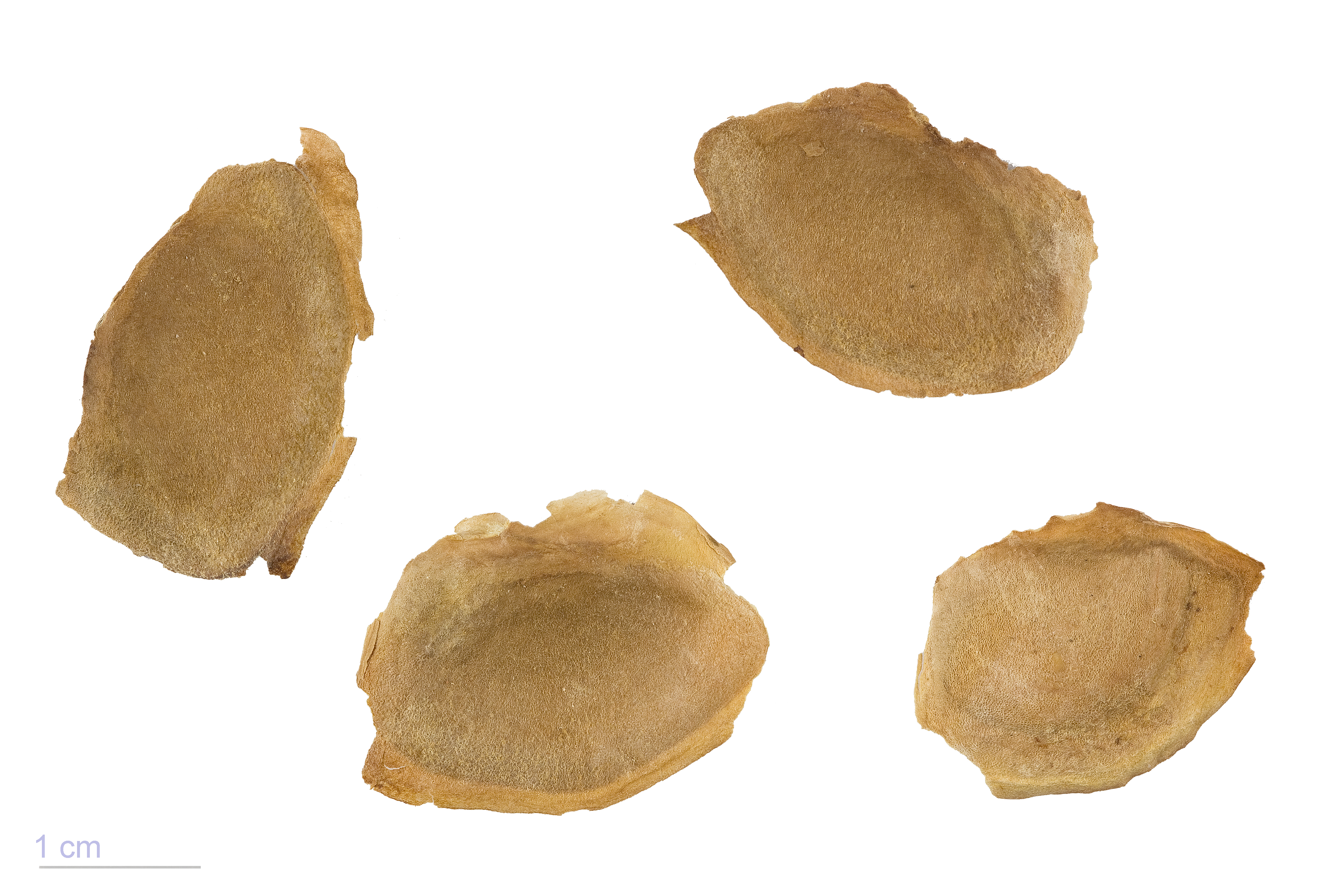
Khaya senegalensis - MHNT

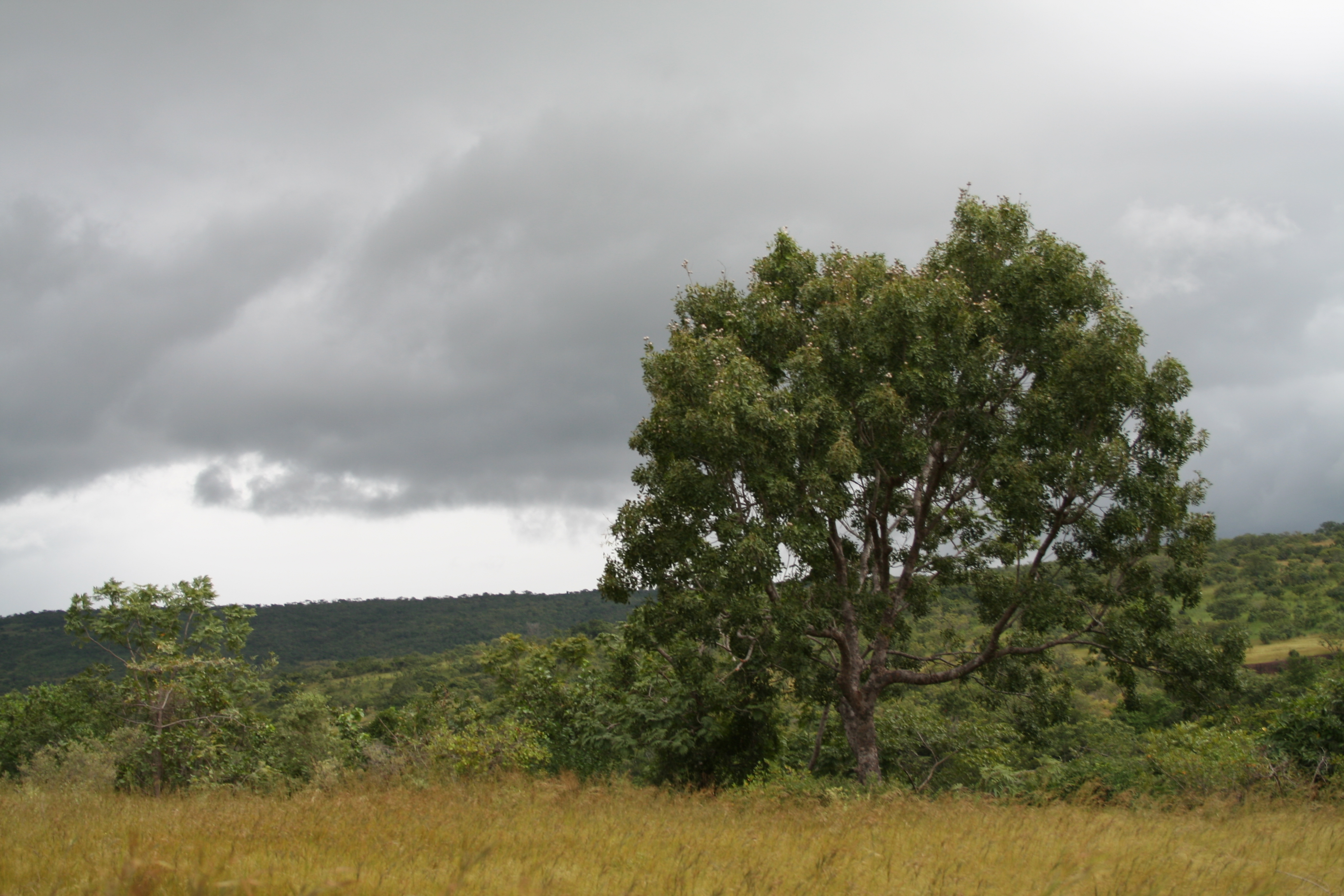
Khaya senegalensis near Mount Tenakourou in Burkina Faso
