= Isometamidium chloride =

Chemical compound

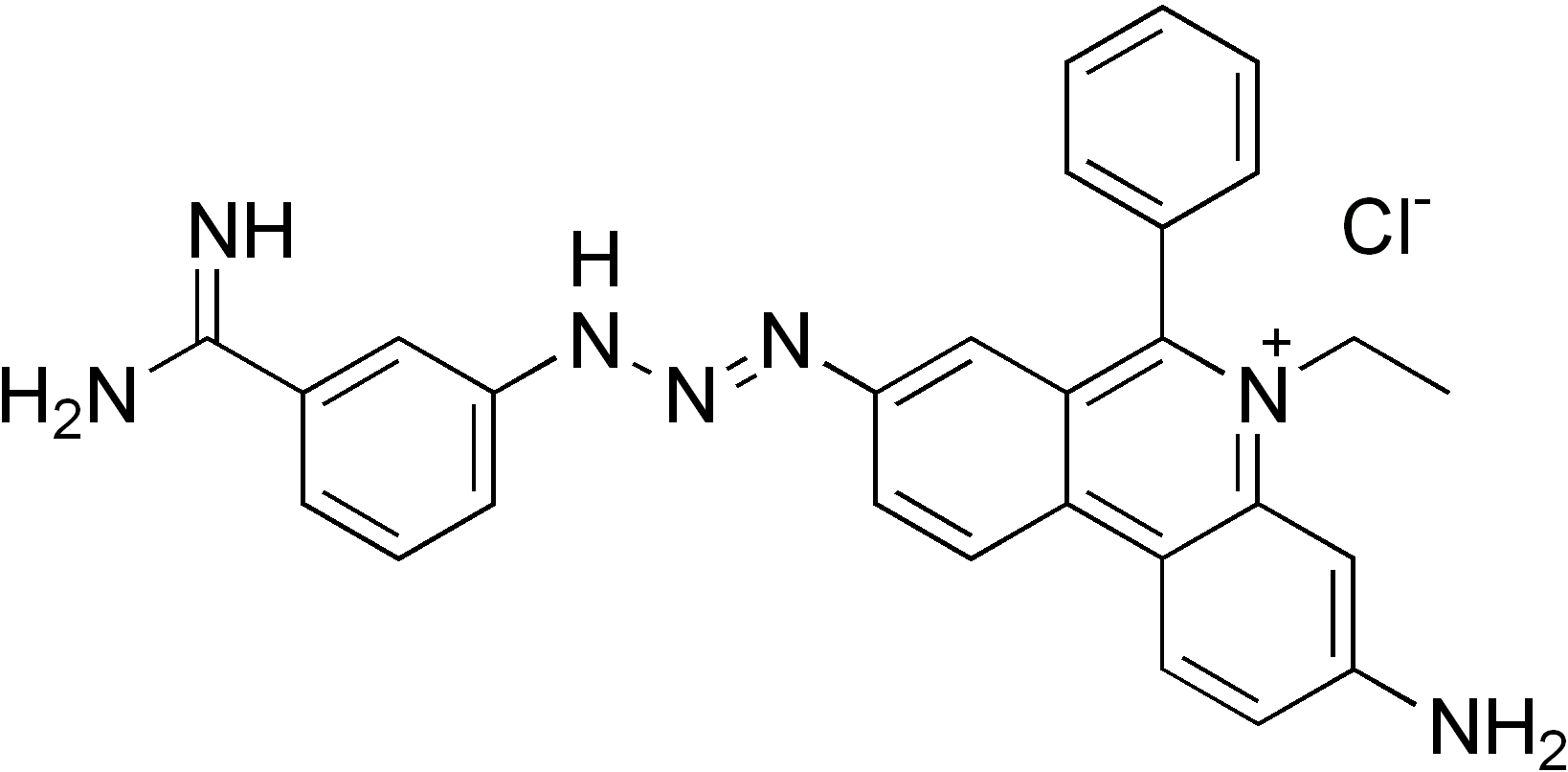

Clinical data
- ATCvet code: QP51DX04 (WHO)

Identifiers
- IUPAC name: 3-[N'-[(3-amino-5-ethyl-6-phenyl-8-phenanthridin-5-iumyl)imino]hydrazino]benzamidine chloride
- CAS Number: 34301-55-8
- PubChem CID: 92295
- ChemSpider: 83326
- UNII: 7NH28I651F
- CompTox Dashboard (EPA): DTXSID10955855
- ECHA InfoCard: 100.047.191

Chemical and physical data
- Formula: C_{28}H_{26}ClN_{7}
- Molar mass: 496.02 g·mol^{−1}
- 3D model (JSmol): Interactive image
- SMILES: [Cl-].[N@H]=C(N)c1cc(ccc1)N/N=N/c4ccc3c2ccc(N)cc2[n+](c(c3c4)c5ccccc5)CC
- InChI: InChI=1S/C28H25N7.ClH/c1-2-35-26-16-20(29)11-13-24(26)23-14-12-22(17-25(23)27(35)18-7-4-3-5-8-18)33-34-32-21-10-6-9-19(15-21)28(30)31;/h3-17,29H,2H2,1H3,(H4,30,31,32,33);1H; Key:QNZJTSGALAVCLH-UHFFFAOYSA-N

Isometamidium chloride is a triazene trypanocidal agent used in veterinary medicine.

It consists of a single ethidium bromide like subunit linked to a fragment of the diminazene molecule.

== Resistance ==
The Gibe River Valley in southwest Ethiopia showed universal resistance between July 1989 and February 1993. This likely indicates a permanent loss of function in this area against the tested target, T. congolense isolated from Boran cattle.
