= C27H32N6 =

The molecular formula C_{27}H_{32}N_{6} (molar mass: 440.58 g/mol, exact mass: 440.2688 u) may refer to:

- AEE788
- Propidium monoazide (PMA)
