= Trypanocidal agent =

A trypanocidal agent is an antiprotozoal agent that acts upon trypanosome parasites.

Examples include:

- Aminoquinuride
- benzonidazole
- blasticidin S
- DAPI
- diminazene
- diminazene aceturate
- eflornithine
- ethidium
- isometamidium chloride
- lonidamine
- melaminylthioarsenate
- melarsoprol
- nifurtimox
- pentamidine
- posaconazole
- puromycin
- quinapyramine
- salicylhydroxamic acid
- suramin
- tetraphenylporphine sulfonate

== Resistance ==
As of 2008, 17 or 18 African countries had confirmed resistant parasite populations, and as of 2011 that was up to 21. Multiply resistant populations are an increasing problem in the Adamawa Region of Cameroon and south east Mali. The Gibe River Valley in southwest Ethiopia showed universal resistance (in T. congolense isolated from Boran cattle) between July 1989 and February 1993. This likely indicates a permanent loss of function in this area for the tested trypanocides, diminazene aceturate, isometamidium chloride, and homidium chloride.

== See also ==
- Trypanosomiasis vaccine
