= Viability PCR =

Laboratory technique to multiply a DNA sample for study

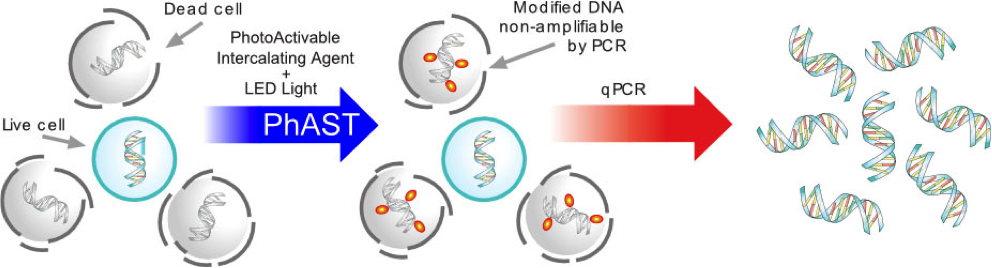
Viability PCR workflow

Viability PCR, also named v-PCR or vPCR, is an evolution of PCR. Through the use of a simple pre-treatment of the sample by the means of specific intercalating photo-reactive reagents it's possible to neutralize the DNA of dead cells. As a result, only DNA from live cells will be detected by PCR. This approach expands a lot the analytical scope of PCR procedures. The capability to detect only living cells become very important, because in key applications is more important to know the amount of live cells, than the total cell level. Examples of this are: food and water quality control, infectious diseases diagnostic, veterinary applications, ecological dynamics...

The first referenced work about this analytical approach was in 2003, Norwegian researchers suggest the use of Ethidium Monoazide, an azide form of Ethidium Bromide, which was used in other analytical fields as Flow Cytometry as a candidate for viability PCR. However, the main important advances were done by Nocker and colleagues, which demonstrated in successive works the potential of this technology and also suggested Propidium monoazide as a better reagent for vPCR.

This field still is in development, from 2003 up to 2015, the scientific evidences about the applicability of vPCR are stacking, nowadays main efforts are focused in procedure optimization. Since a simple reagent mix with the sample, photo-activation and subsequent PCR not always shows expected results, each procedure needs some optimization. Up to now the main improvements has been :

- Improving the efficiency of photo activation: early procedures were based on high power halogen lamps which overheated the samples and don't ensured constant light dose, these home made solutions have been replaced by led based instruments.

- The use of long PCR amplicons as targets.

- The increase of temperature during dark incubation.

Through combining different optimizations strategies and controlling the analytical bias, nowadays the vPCR becomes a powerful analytical tool.
