= Griffith Evans (disambiguation) =

Griffith Evans (1887–1973) is an American mathematician

Griffith Evans may also refer to:

- Griffith Evans (bacteriologist) (1835–1935), Welsh veterinary pathologist
- Griffith Evans (politician) (1869–1943), Australian politician
