= Ethidium bromide =

DNA gel stain and veterinary drug

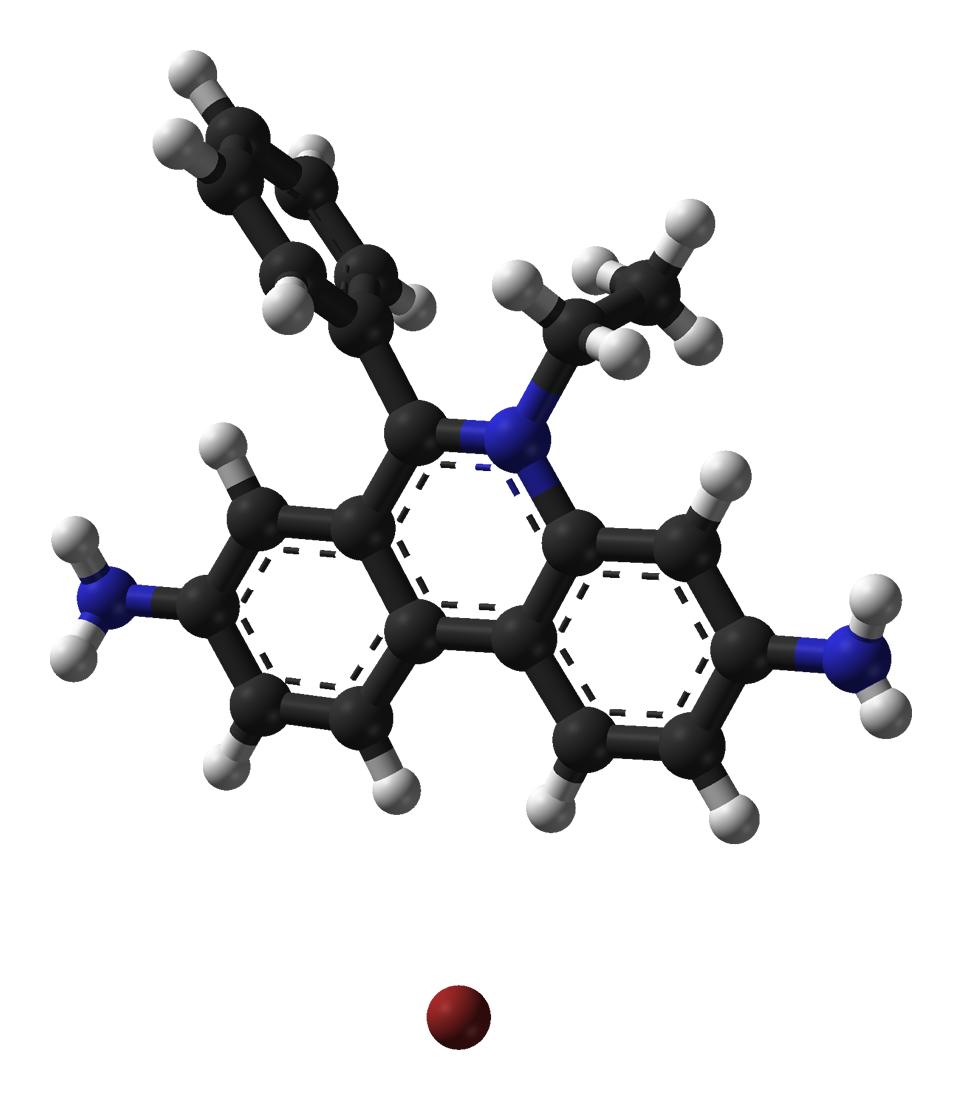

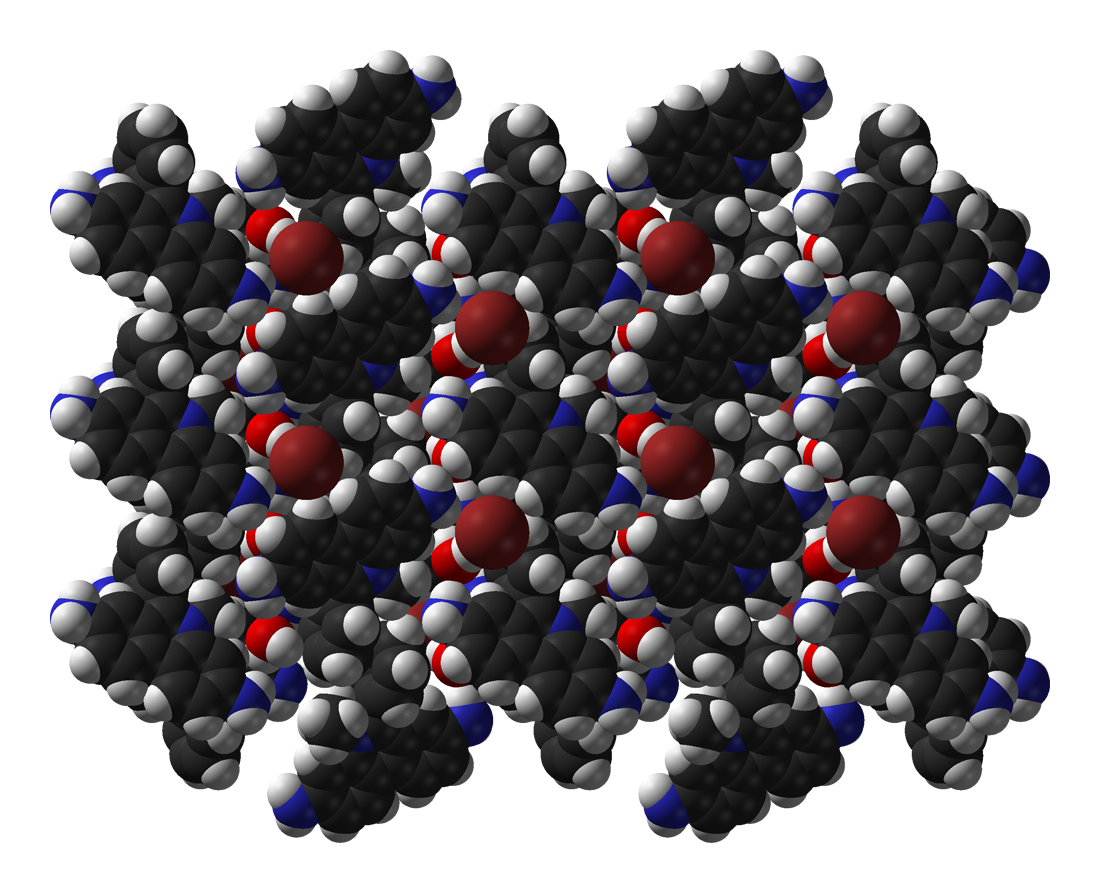

Names
- Preferred IUPAC name 3,8-Diamino-5-ethyl-6-phenylphenanthridin-5-ium bromide
- Other names: 2,7-Diamino-10-ethyl-6-phenylphenanthridinium bromide; 2,7-Diamino-10-ethyl-9-phenylphenanthridinium bromide; 3,8-Diamino-1-ethyl-6-phenylphenantridinium bromide; 5-Ethyl-6-phenyl-phenanthridine-3,8-diamine bromide; Ethidium bromide; Homidium bromide; EtBr; EthBr

Identifiers
CAS Number	1239-45-8
3D model (JSmol)	Interactive image
Beilstein Reference	3642536
ChEBI	CHEBI:4883
ChEMBL	ChEMBL284328
ChemSpider	14034
ECHA InfoCard	100.013.622
EC Number	214-984-6
KEGG	C11161
PubChem CID	14710
RTECS number	SF7950000
UNII	059NUO2Z1L
UN number	2811
CompTox Dashboard (EPA)	DTXSID8025258
- InChI: InChI=1S/C21H19N3.BrH/c1-2-24-20-13-16(23)9-11-18(20)17-10-8-15(22)12-19(17)21(24)14-6-4-3-5-7-14;/h3-13,23H,2,22H2,1H3;1H Key: ZMMJGEGLRURXTF-UHFFFAOYSA-N; InChI=1/C21H19N3.BrH/c1-2-24-20-13-16(23)9-11-18(20)17-10-8-15(22)12-19(17)21(24)14-6-4-3-5-7-14;/h3-13,23H,2,22H2,1H3;1H Key: ZMMJGEGLRURXTF-UHFFFAOYAD
- SMILES: CC[n+]1c2cc(N)ccc2c3ccc(N)cc3c1c4ccccc4.[Br-]

Properties
Chemical formula	C_{21}H_{20}BrN_{3}
Molar mass	394.316 g·mol^{−1}
Appearance	Purple-red solid
Density	1.3739
Melting point	260 to 262 °C (500 to 504 °F; 533 to 535 K)
Solubility in water	~40 g/l

Pharmacology
ATCvet code	QP51DX03 (WHO)

Hazards
- GHS labelling
Pictograms	(GHS06: Toxic) (GHS08: Health hazard)
Signal word	Danger
Hazard statements	H302, H330, H341
Precautionary statements	P201, P202, P260, P284, P301+P312, P304+P340+P310
NFPA 704 (fire diamond)	4 1 0
Flash point	> 100 °C (212 °F; 373 K)
- Except where otherwise noted, data are given for materials in their standard state (at 25 °C [77 °F], 100 kPa). verify (what is ?) Infobox references

Ethidium bromide (or homidium bromide, chloride salt homidium chloride) is an intercalating agent commonly used as a fluorescent tag (nucleic acid stain) in molecular biology laboratories for techniques such as agarose gel electrophoresis. It is commonly abbreviated as EtBr, which is also an abbreviation for bromoethane. To avoid confusion, some laboratories have used the abbreviation EthBr for this salt. When exposed to ultraviolet light, it will fluoresce with an orange colour, intensifying almost 20-fold after binding to DNA. Under the name homidium, it has been commonly used since the 1950s in veterinary medicine to treat trypanosomiasis in cattle. The high incidence of antimicrobial resistance makes this treatment impractical in some areas, where the related isometamidium chloride is used instead. Despite its reputation as a mutagen, tests have shown it to have low mutagenicity without metabolic activation.

== Structure, chemistry, and fluorescence ==
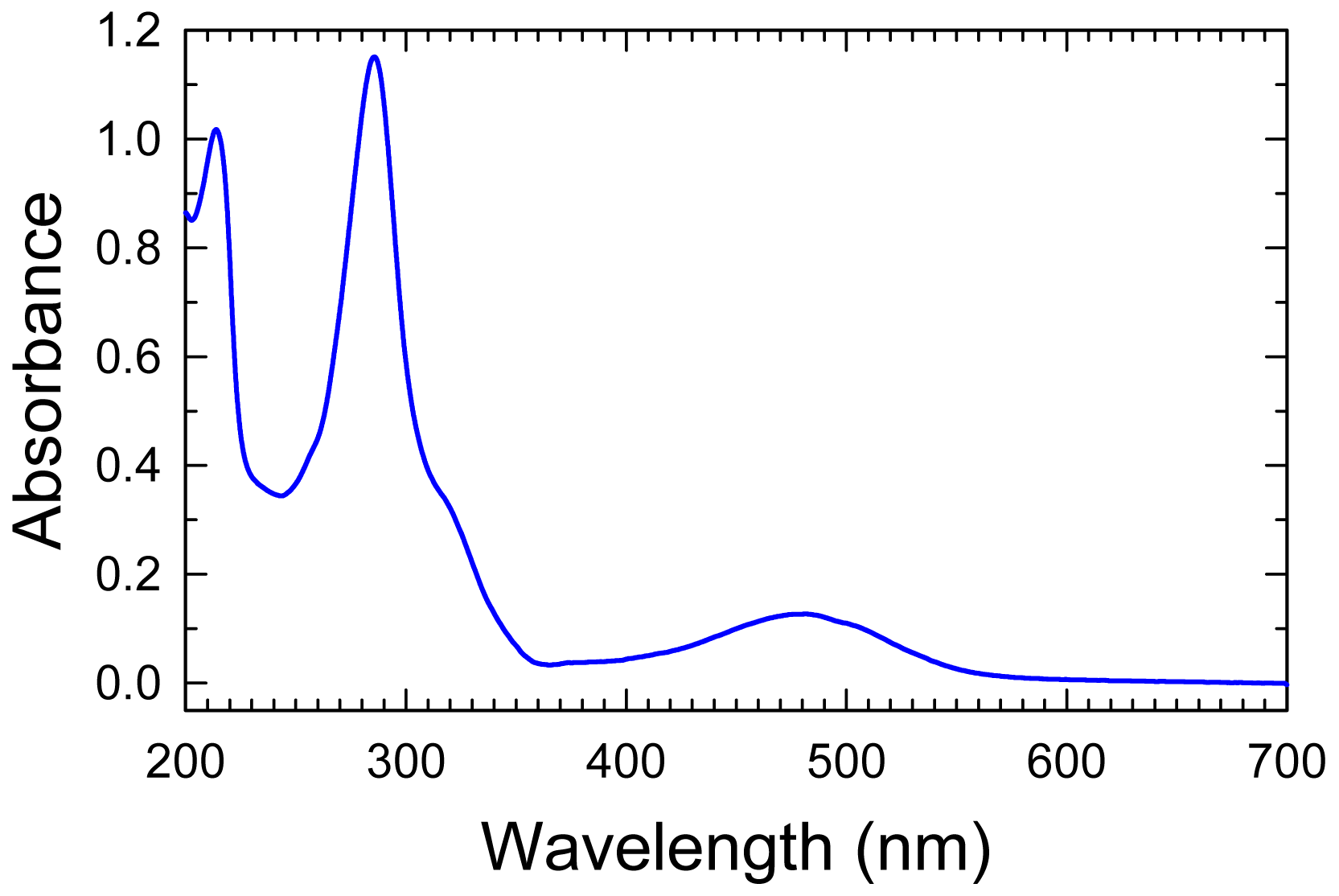
Absorption spectrum of ethidium bromide

As with most fluorescent compounds, ethidium bromide is aromatic. Its core heterocyclic moiety is generically known as a phenanthridine, an isomer of which is the fluorescent dye acridine. Absorption maxima of EtBr in aqueous solution are at 210 nm and 285 nm, which correspond to ultraviolet light. As a result of this excitation, EtBr emits orange light with wavelength 605 nm.

Ethidium bromide's intense fluorescence after binding with DNA is probably not due to rigid stabilization of the phenyl moiety, because the phenyl ring has been shown to project outside the intercalated bases. In fact, the phenyl group is found to be almost perpendicular to the plane of the ring system, as it rotates about its single bond to find a position where it will impinge upon the ring system minimally. Instead, the hydrophobic environment found between the base pairs is believed to be responsible. By moving into this hydrophobic environment and away from the solvent, the ethidium cation is forced to shed any water molecules that were associated with it. As water is a highly efficient fluorescence quencher, the removal of these water molecules allows the ethidium to fluoresce.

== Applications ==
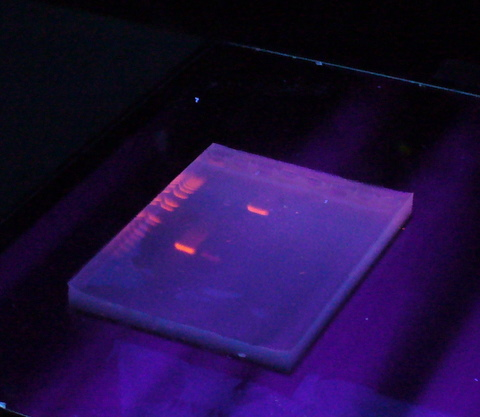
DNA sample separated using gel electrophoresis of nucleic acids and stained with ethidium bromide, which emits orange light after binding to DNA

Ethidium bromide is commonly used to detect nucleic acids in molecular biology laboratories. In the case of DNA this is usually double-stranded DNA from PCRs, restriction digests, etc. Single-stranded RNA can also be detected, since it usually folds back onto itself and thus provides local base pairing for the dye to intercalate. Detection typically involves a gel containing nucleic acids placed on or under an ultraviolet lamp. Since ultraviolet light is harmful to eyes and skin, gels stained with ethidium bromide are usually viewed indirectly using an enclosed camera, with the fluorescent images recorded as photographs. Where direct viewing is needed, the viewer's eyes and exposed skin should be protected. In the laboratory the intercalating properties have long been used to minimize chromosomal condensation when a culture is exposed to mitotic arresting agents during harvest. The resulting slide preparations permit a higher degree of resolution, and thus more confidence in determining structural integrity of chromosomes upon microscopic analysis.

Ethidium bromide is also used during DNA fragment separation by agarose gel electrophoresis. It is added to running buffer and binds by intercalating between DNA base pairs. When the agarose gel is illuminated using UV light, DNA bands become visible. Intercalation of EtBr can alter properties of the DNA molecule, such as charge, weight, conformation, and flexibility. Since the mobilities of DNA molecules through the agarose gel are measured relative to a molecular weight standard, the effects of EtBr can be critical to determining the sizes of molecules.

Ethidium bromide has also been used extensively to reduce mitochondrial DNA copy number in proliferating cells. The effect of EtBr on mitochondrial DNA is used in veterinary medicine to treat trypanosomiasis in cattle, as EtBr binds molecules of kinetoplastid DNA and changes their conformation to the Z-DNA form. This form inhibits replication of kinetoplastid DNA, which is lethal for trypanosomes.

The chloride salt homidium chloride has the same applications.

Ethidium bromide can be added to YPD media and used as an inhibitor for cell growth.

The binding affinity of the cationic nanoparticles with DNA could be evaluated by competitive binding with ethidium bromide.

EtBr can stain proteins as well as nucleic acids.

=== Alternatives for gel ===
There are alternatives to ethidium bromide which are advertised as being less dangerous and having better performance. For example, several SYBR-based dyes are used by some researchers and there are other emerging stains such as "Novel Juice". SYBR dyes are less mutagenic than EtBr by the Ames test with liver extract. However, SYBR Green I was actually found to be more mutagenic than EtBr to the bacterial cells exposed to UV (which is used to visualize either dye). This may be the case for other "safer" dyes, but while mutagenic and toxicity details are available these have not been published in peer-reviewed journals. The MSDS for SYBR Safe reports an LD_{50} for rats of over 5 g/kg, which is higher than that of EtBr (1.5 g/kg). Many alternative dyes are suspended in DMSO, which has health implications of its own, including increased skin absorption of organic compounds. Despite the performance advantage of using SYBR dyes instead of EtBr for staining purposes, many researchers still prefer EtBr since it is considerably less expensive.

== Possible carcinogenic activity ==
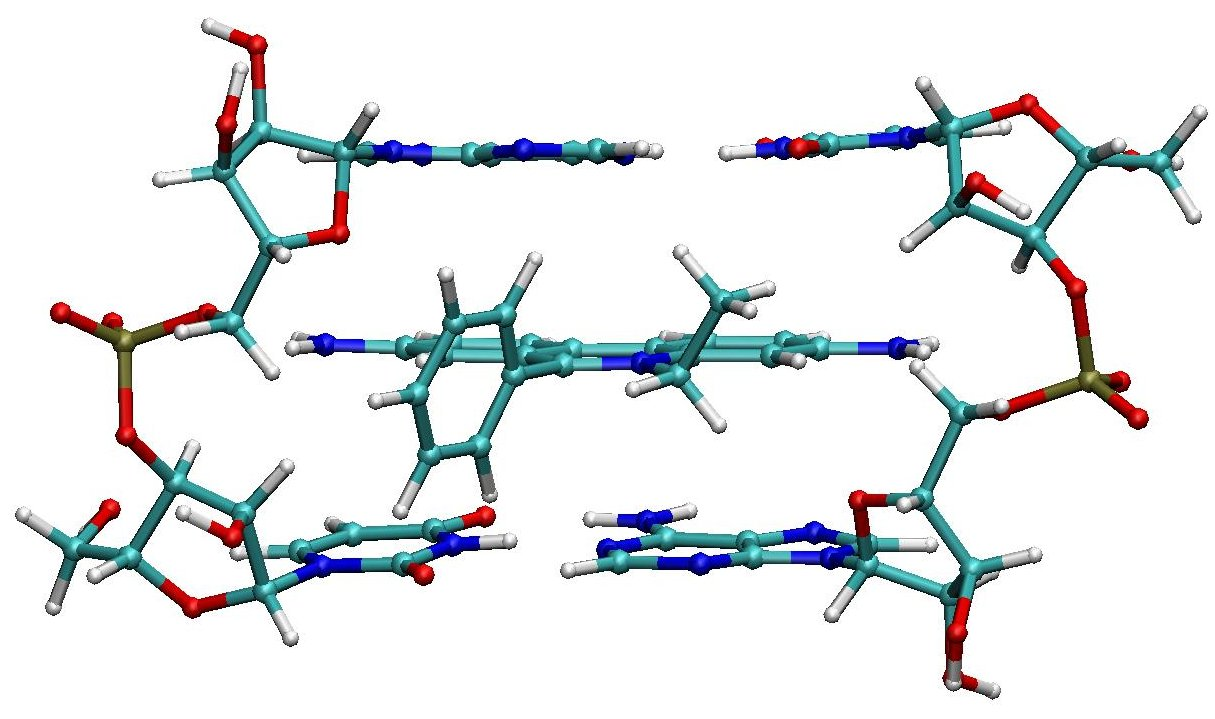
Ethidium bromide intercalated between two adenine–thymine base pairs. The intercalation is said by some to motivate a high mutagenicity of DNA.

Most use of ethidium bromide in the laboratory (0.25–1 μg/mL) is below the LD50 dosage, making acute toxicity unlikely. Testing in humans and longer studies in a mammalian system would be required to fully understand the long-term risk ethidium bromide poses to lab workers, but it is clear that ethidium bromide can cause mutations in mammalian and bacterial cells.

== Handling and disposal ==
Ethidium bromide is not regulated as hazardous waste at low concentrations, but is treated as hazardous waste by many organizations. Material should be handled according to the manufacturer's safety data sheet (SDS).

The disposal of laboratory ethidium bromide remains a controversial subject. Ethidium bromide can be degraded chemically, or collected and incinerated. It is common for ethidium bromide waste below a mandated concentration to be disposed of normally (such as pouring it down a drain). A common practice is to treat ethidium bromide with sodium hypochlorite (bleach) before disposal. According to Lunn and Sansone, chemical degradation using bleach yields compounds which are mutagenic by the Ames test. Data are lacking on the mutagenic effects of degradation products. Lunn and Sansone describe more effective methods for degradation. Elsewhere, ethidium bromide removal from solutions with activated charcoal or ion exchange resin is recommended. Various commercial products are available for this use.

== Drug resistance ==
Trypanosomes in the Gibe River Valley in southwest Ethiopia showed universal resistance between July 1989 and February 1993. This likely indicates a permanent loss of function in this area against the tested target, T. congolense isolated from Boran cattle.

== See also ==
- Phenanthridine
- Agarose gel electrophoresis and gel electrophoresis of nucleic acids
- GelRed (itself derived from EthBr) and GelGreen, marketed as safer and more intense DNA stains
- Propidium iodide and propidium monoazide, related dyes
