= Tetraphenylporphine sulfonate =

Chemical compound

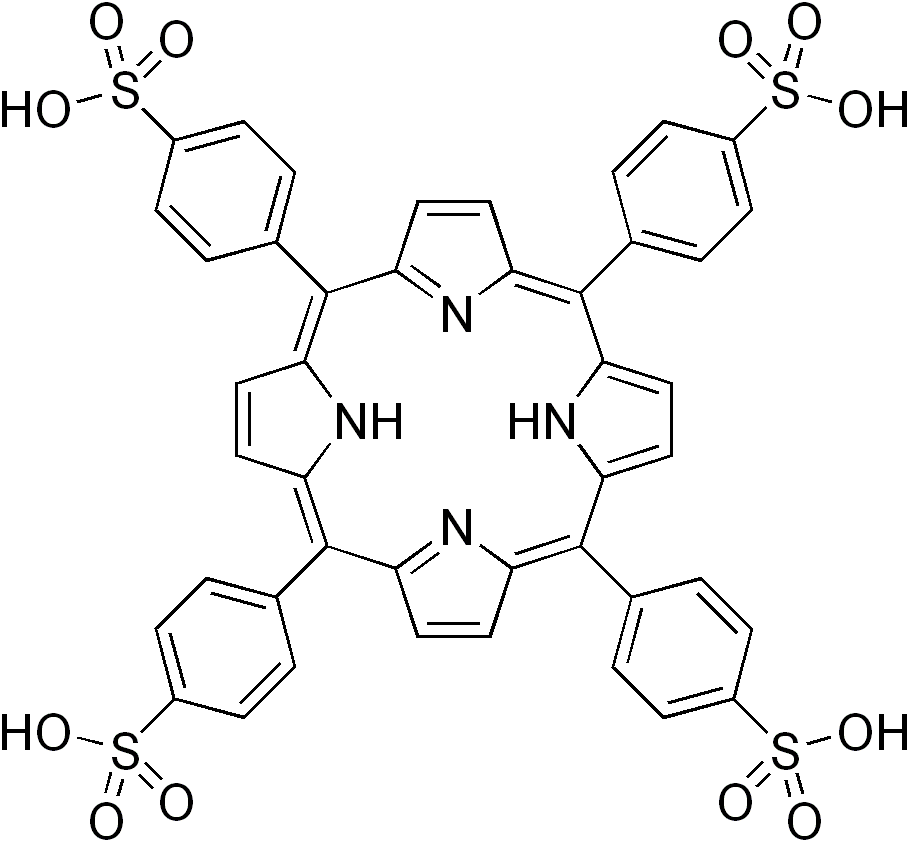

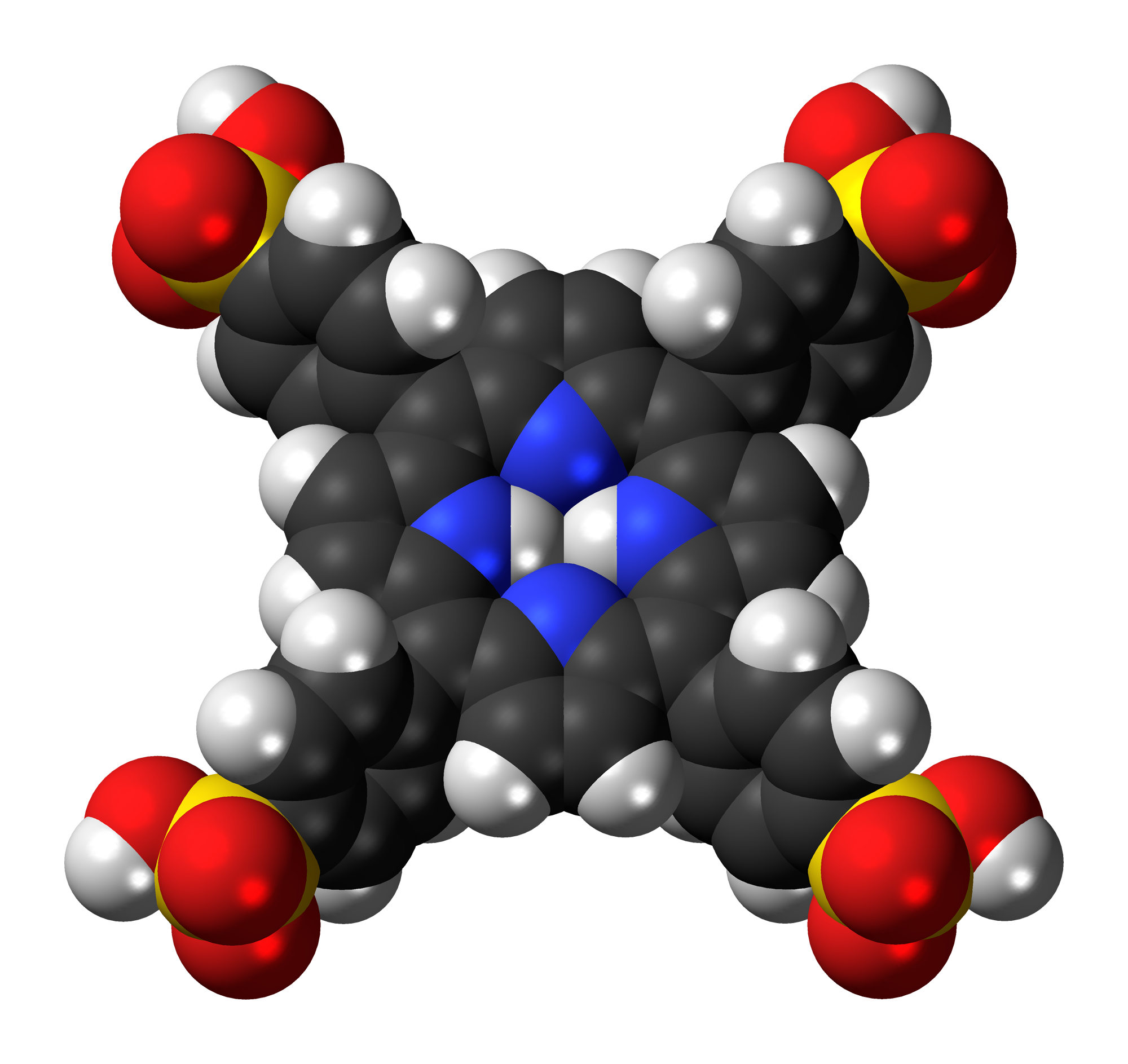

Clinical data
- ATC code: none

Identifiers
- IUPAC name: 4-[10,15,20-tris(4-sulfophenyl)-21,22-dihydroporphyrin-5-yl]benzenesulfonic acid
- CAS Number: 35218-75-8
- PubChem CID: 49561
- ChemSpider: 45003
- UNII: 5ZC8JLH3BN

Chemical and physical data
- Formula: C_{44}H_{30}N_{4}O_{12}S_{4}
- Molar mass: 934.98 g·mol^{−1}
- 3D model (JSmol): Interactive image
- SMILES: C1=CC(=CC=C1C2=C3C=CC(=C(C4=CC=C(N4)C(=C5C=CC(=N5)C(=C6C=CC2=N6)C7=CC=C(C=C7)S(=O)(=O)O)C8=CC=C(C=C8)S(=O)(=O)O)C9=CC=C(C=C9)S(=O)(=O)O)N3)S(=O)(=O)O
- InChI: InChI=1S/C44H30N4O12S4/c49-61(50,51)29-9-1-25(2-10-29)41-33-17-19-35(45-33)42(26-3-11-30(12-4-26)62(52,53)54)37-21-23-39(47-37)44(28-7-15-32(16-8-28)64(58,59)60)40-24-22-38(48-40)43(36-20-18-34(41)46-36)27-5-13-31(14-6-27)63(55,56)57/h1-24,45-46H,(H,49,50,51)(H,52,53,54)(H,55,56,57)(H,58,59,60)/b41-33-,41-34-,42-35-,42-37-,43-36-,43-38-,44-39-,44-40-; Key:YAVMDSYMZGJNES-LWQDQPMZSA-N

Tetraphenylporphine sulfonate is a trypanocidal agent.
