= Morris Soller =

American-Israeli agricultural geneticist (1931–2026)

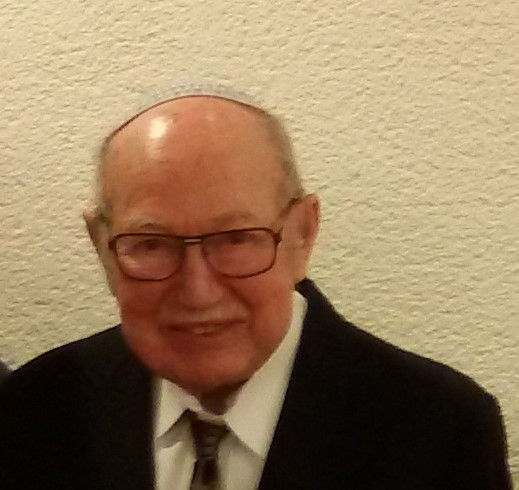
Morris Soller

Morris Moshe Soller (Hebrew: משה מוריס סולר; 1931 – May 2026) was an American-Israeli agricultural geneticist. He was a research professor in the Department of Genetics of the Hebrew University of Jerusalem. His focus was livestock- and crop- genetics, including trypanotolerance in cattle.

== Early life and education ==
Soller was born in Manhattan, New York City, in 1931. At the age of 12 he was first inspired to learn about genetics by reading The Theory of the Gene by Thomas Hunt Morgan. While an undergraduate he read Jay Laurence Lush's Animal Breeding Plans and learned much from it – and would receive the award named for Lush 50 years later – see below. Soller also learned much from the writings of Ronald Fisher and Sewall Wright during this time. In 1951 he earned a Bachelor's Degree in Agriculture and then in 1956 both a Master's Degree in Applied Statistics and a Doctorate of Philosophy in Animal Breeding from Rutgers University. He would later return to his birth country for further postdoctoral education at Indiana University and Roosevelt University in biochemistry.

== Research and teaching career ==
In 1957 he was hired by the Volcani Center as their senior scientist for animal breeding and by Bar-Ilan University as a senior lecturer of Biology and Genetics. He moved his family to Israel where they went on to live most of their lives. Between 1966 and 1972 Soller was a lecturer at Roosevelt University in the USA. In 1972 he returned to Israel to lecture at the Alexander Silberman Institute of Life Sciences, Hebrew University of Jerusalem in the Department of Genetics. He would eventually become a full professor and emeritus professor in 2000. He later worked in lecturing and research including sabbaticals as the Cotswold Visiting Scientist at Iowa State University, at the University of Illinois and elsewhere.

Soller was the originator of quantitative trait locus mapping and marker-assisted selection. He began noticing the statistical patterns and composing the mathematical tools that would be required for these techniques in 1974, while studying crop genetics and livestock genetics. He went on to collaborate with his students and peers to create the F2, backcrossing, full sib, half sib, granddaughter, AIL and selective DNA pooling techniques in QTL mapping. Along with other laboratories around the world, his group developed some of the earliest restriction fragment length polymorphism markers for cattle and microsatellite markers for chickens.

He especially become known for using these techniques to analyse trypanotolerance in cattle, especially in the N'Dama breed. Soller also applied QTL analysis to dairy traits and Marek's disease.

== Death ==
On 14 May 2026, it was announced that Soller had died.

== Professional recognition ==
- 1996 – American Association for the Advancement of Science elected him a Fellow
- 1999 – Awarded the Jay L. Lush Award by the American Dairy Science Association
- 2000 – Chosen to give the A. B. Chapman Lecture of the University of Wisconsin
- 2000 – Honorary doctorate from Iowa State University "for leading the way in the actual discovery of genetic science"
- 2007 – Honorary doctorate from the University of Liege, Belgium
- 2012 – Honorary member of the International Society for Animal Genetics
- 2012 – The journal Animal Genetics published a special issue in his honor.

== Published works ==
As of 2012 Soller had authored and coauthored over 170 peer reviewed publications, and many book chapters and encyclopedia articles. The organisms he studied include cattle and chickens, but also extend to plants, viruses, mice, pigs and others.

- Kemp, Stephen J.; Iraqi, Fuad; Darvasi, Ariel; Soller, Morris; Teale, Alan J. (1997). "Localization of genes controlling resistance to trypanosomiasis in mice". Nature Genetics. 16 (2). Springer Science and Business Media LLC: 194–196. doi:10.1038/ng0697-194. ISSN 1061-4036. PMID 9171834. S2CID 19998760. Localization of genes controlling resistance to trypanosomiasis in mice (Q58843113).

—Popularly cited including by

- Soller, Morris (16 February 2015). "If a Bull Were a Cow, How Much Milk Would He Give?". Annual Review of Animal Biosciences. 3 (1). Annual Reviews: 1–17. doi:10.1146/annurev-animal-022114-110751. ISSN 2165-8102. PMID 25493539. S2CID 46733451.

— An autobiography Soller was invited to write by Annual Reviews
