= Griffith Evans (bacteriologist) =

Welsh veterinary pathologist (1835–1935)

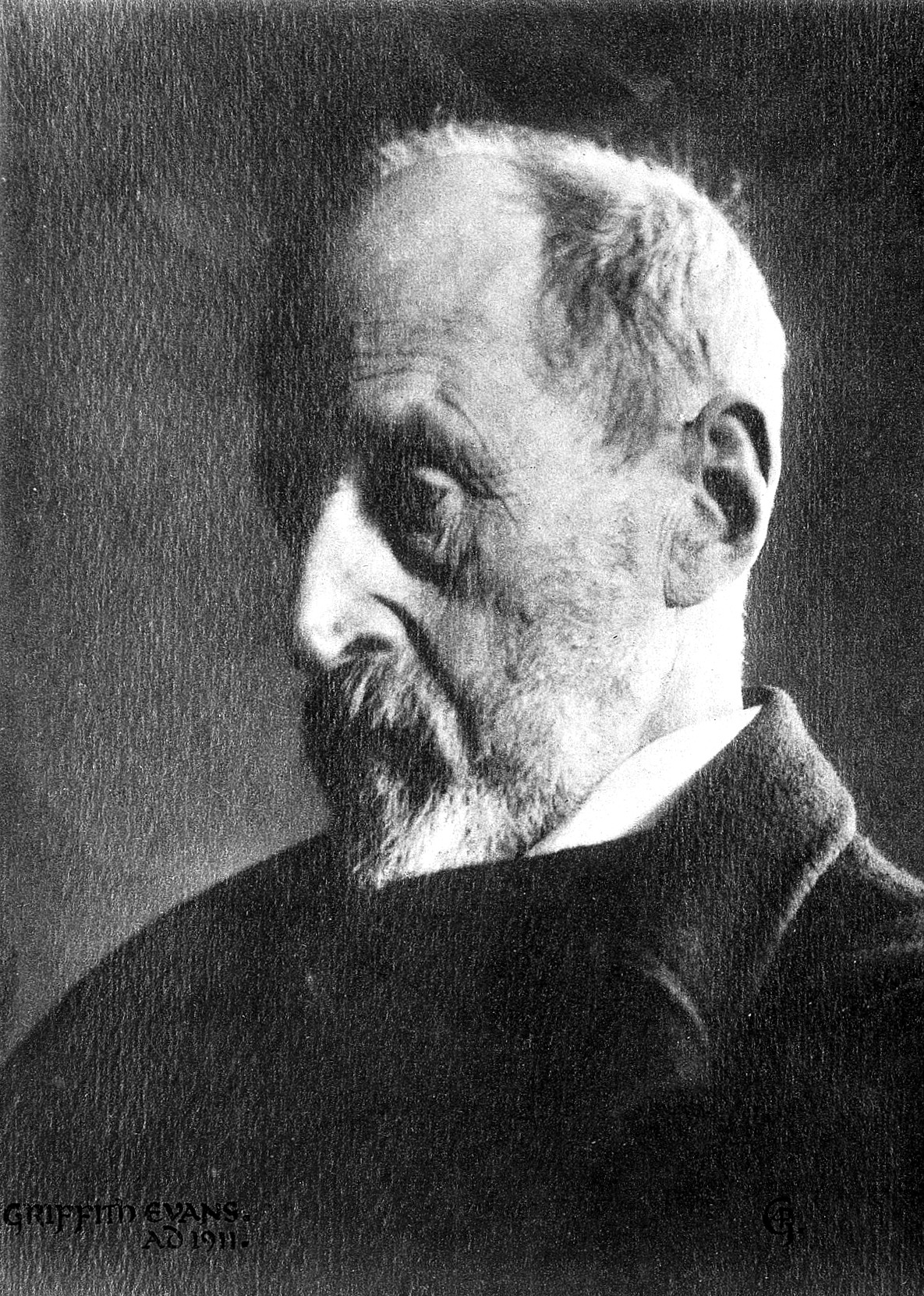
- Born: 7 August 1835; Ty-mawr, Towyn, Wales, UK
- Died: 7 December 1935 (aged 100); Bangor
- Education: Royal Veterinary College; McGill University
- Known for: Discovery of Trypanosoma evansi
- Spouse: Catherine Mary
- Children: 1 son and 2 daughters
- Awards: Mary Kingsley medal (1917); John Steel Medal (1918); Hunterian medal (1932)
- Scientific career
- Fields: Microbiology; Veterinary parasitology
- Workplaces: Royal Artillery

Griffith Evans (7 August 1835 – 7 December 1935) was a Welsh physician and veterinary pathologist who was the first to determine that a trypanosome parasite was responsible for surra disease in horses while serving in British India. Described as "the man who first saw a pathogenic trypanosome", he identified the causal organism as a haematozoon (blood parasite) in 1880 which was given the species name Trypanosoma evansi after him.

== Biography ==
Evans was born in Ty-mawr, Towyn, Wales, as the only son to Evan Evans (1801–1882) and Mary Jones (1809–1877). Coming from a wealthy family with an illustrious history he went to school at Bryn-crug and later studied privately under a local medical doctor John Pughe at Aberdovey and Towyn. Due to family circumstances, Pughe suggested that Evans could become a veterinarian in shorter time than as a doctor. He joined the course, bought himself a microscope for private study, and qualified at the top of his MRCVS batch in 1855 from the Royal Veterinary College and joined the army in the Royal Artillery much against the wishes of his mother who believed that army life was "... a life of debauchery, low living and drunkeness."

Griffith first served in Canada during the American Civil War and was stationed at Montreal from 1861. He enrolled for medicine and received an MD from McGill University in 1860 with a thesis on tuberculosis. He met Abraham Lincoln, who directed him to work as a medic at the battle zones. He returned to England in 1870. In 1871, he exchanged his service in the Royal Artillery with the Royal Army Service Corps. Initially posted in Woolwich, he worked variously at King's College London and the Royal Ophthalmic Hospital at Moorfields. In 1877, he was deployed to India to study a disease outbreak at Sialkot in Punjab. In 1880 he was posted to study surra disease at Dera Ismail Khan (now in Pakistan). He returned to Britain in 1885 and retired five years later.

He married Catherine Mary née Jones (1843–1923) in 1870 and they had a son and four daughters. He retired from army service in 1890.

== Scientific contributions ==
=== Anthrax ===
When Griffith investigated in 1877 a fatal disease of horses that severely struck those of the British Army, he was quick to identify bacteria in all diseases animals. He identified the disease, which was then called "Loodiana disease" (after the city Ludhiana) or "malignant fever," as anthrax. He reported his findings in The Veterinary Journal in 1878.

While identifying the anthrax bacteria from the horse blood under microscope, Griffith observed two other important pathological conditions. The first was that when he looked at the bacteria from fresh blood samples, the bacteria appeared to be surrounded more and more by certain white blood cells that were not present in the fresh samples. He described:

I officially reported, what surprised me most, that the first change in the blood seen by the microscope was a great increase in the number of the large white corpuscles before I could see a bacillus. I examined the blood regularly every hour from the first symptom of illness, and noted invariably the increasing number of these corpuscles for some time before I could find a bacillus. The bacilli, when they came, appeared to be closer to the white than to the red corpuscles; subsequently the number of the bacilli in each droplet multiplied rapidly, so they could be seen isolated, free from corpuscles. I expressed my conviction that the large granular corpuscles had a very important relation to the bacilli, but I could not think what it was I repeatedly emphasised my belief that it deserved special investigation.

He had no means to further study this phenomenon, which is now known as phagocytosis, a cellular process by which white blood cells protect by devouring pathogens. The phenomenon was discovered in its full form by Russian zoologist Élie Metchnikoff in 1882, who received the 1908 Nobel Prize in Physiology or Medicine for the discovery that established the science of immunology. An additional observation of Griffith was that in some horses, some horses had parasites in their blood and respiratory tract. Those were roundworms, but he did not know them. He suggested them to be kinds of worms, as he reported:

I saw [in the blood sample] what I thought were bacteria swarming in it. I made a rather hasty conclusion, because I was thinking of Anthrax, and as this disease is commonly identified with it, I was really looking for bacteria. On closer inspection, I thought they were more likely to be blood-crystals: they resembled very closely the small prismatic crystals of Haematoglobulin [haemoglobin]. I have since come to the conclusion that they are worms in a very early stage of development... Now, I do not know what these things are,—whether they belong to the animal or vegetable kingdom. I call them worms, because they are worm-like. I know very little about parasites.

The Veterinary Journal commented the discovery as: "Should his discovery turn out to be a real one, then we shall have the key to the etiology of a very serious and hitherto mysterious disease, and this may lead to our ascertaining that other obscure disorders of animals are due to a similar cause."

=== Parasite of surra ===
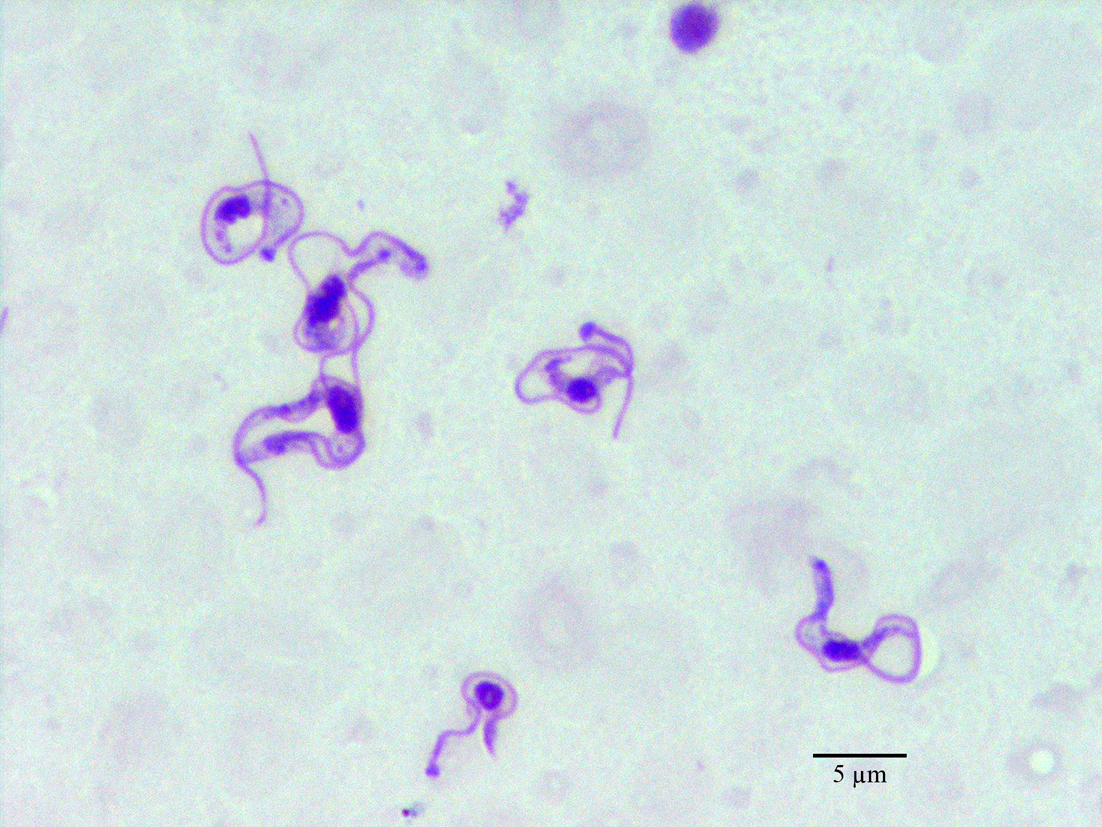
Trypanosoma evansi from a Tunisian dog

In August 1880, Griffith was transferred to Dera Ismail Khan to investigate cases of surra (from the Marathi sūra, meaning the sound of heavy breathing through nostrils), another disease common in horses, cattle and camels. On 22 September 1880, he obtained blood sample of diseases horses which he noticed were swarming with parasites. The microbes appeared to like and attack the red blood cells, for which his colleague suggested they name the parasites "ferox" (Latin for wild, ferocious, or cruel). In a report in The Veterinary Journal in 1881, he described:

When I first saw it [the parasite) I thought for a moment it was some form of spirillum [a kind of bacteria], but the next instant convinced me it was not... It has an apparently round body, when it is fresh and active, which tapers in front to a neck ending in a blunt head, and behind it has a tapering tail from which there extends a long slender lash [this now known as the flagella, and is located towards the anterior end, not at the "tail"], so fine that it can seldom be seen... I came to the conclusion that it has two fin-like papillae on each side, one near where the neck commences and another near where the tail begins [now understood to be one undulating membrane, not two, formed by a flagellum].

Griffith was careful in attributing the parasite as the cause of the disease. He designed and performed an original experiment by inoculating the diseased blood sample into the stomach of one healthy horse and skin (dermal layer) of another. The experimental horses got sick and their blood samples showed numerous parasites, indicating the same parasite had survived, reproduced and produced the symptoms. He then induced infection in dogs with similar results. In fact, a puppy got infected from the mother without any experimental infection, indicating that the infection was transmitted though the milk. At the time surra was not known to occur in dogs. Griffith was convinced that the parasite was the causative pathogen of surra.

Griffith consulted Timothy Richards Lewis, who at the time was the Special Assistant to the Sanitary Commissioner in British India and who had discovered a trypanosome (later named Trypanosoma lewisi) of rats in 1878 (reported in 1879). He sent the infected puppy from which Lewis confirmed the presence of parasites in the blood similar to his discovery. However, Lewis disagreed on one aspect, as his trypanosmes were found in healthy rats, he objected to the idea that Griffith's parasites were the cause of surra. Griffith's experiments did not convince the medical community. Lewis and David Douglas Cunningham (Professor of Physiology in the Medical College, Calcutta, and Surgeon-General of India) officially declared that "no microbe found in the living blood of any animal was pathogenic." As reported in Nature, "Official opinion was strongly against him [Griffith]."

Griffith's discovery was independently proved by J. H. Steel who reported the same parasites from transport mules in British Burma (now Myanmar) in 1885. The Punjab Military Department published Steel's and Griffith's reports showing the similarity of the parasites and the diseases. Steel believed that the parasite was a type of spirochaete bacteria and named it Spirochaeta evansi, honouring the original discoverer. After returning to England, Griffith continued the research with Edgar Crookshank at King's College London. Crookshank identified the parasite as a kind of protozoan with similarity to the protozoan parasite of fish (Haematomonas Mitrophanow, described in 1883) and renamed it as Haematonomas evansi, but quickly changed it to Trichomonas evansi. The correct description and the name Trypanosoma evansi were given by a French veterinarian J. Chauvrat in 1896. Surra then was established as the first trypanosome disease (trypanosomiasis).

== Awards and honours ==
Griffith was elected member of the British Medical Association from 1874. He received the Mary Kingsley Medal from the BMA and a medal from the Liverpool School of Tropical Medicine in on 14 December 1917. The next year, the Royal College of Veterinary Surgeons awarded him its John Steel Medal. The University of Wales conferred him honoris causa DSc degree in 1919. He received the first Hunterian medal of the Hunterian Society in 1932.

Griffith's centennial birthday was celebrated with tributes from the King and Queen, Prince of Wales, Royal Veterinary College, and the mayor of Bangor. He was conferred an honorary citizenship honour, freeman of the City of Bangor.
