= António Fernandes (Jesuit) =

Portuguese explorer

- Born: 1569; Lisbon, Kingdom of Portugal
- Died: 12 November 1642 (aged 72–73); Goa, Portuguese India
- Occupations: Jesuit missionary, explorer

António Fernandes (c. 1569 at Lisbon – 12 November 1642 at Goa) was a Portuguese Jesuit missionary.

== Life ==
About 1602 he was sent to India, whence two years later he went to Ethiopia, where he soon won favour with Emperor Susenyos.

Sent on missions for the king, Fernandes in 1613 was dispatched south to find a route to Malindi on the Indian Ocean. According to James Bruce, Fernandes first started for Gojjam with Fecur Egzie, a Catholic convert, and ten Portuguese companions. After obtaining guides for the region south of the Abay, they left Gojjam 15 April, made their way through the territory of the Gonga, through Bizamo and to Ennarea where they were warmly welcomed.

After an audience with the Benero or king of Ennerea, who received them surprisingly coolly (due to the influence of an Ethiopian Orthodox monk who was opposed to Fernandes's journey) and sent them to Malindi by way of Bale. António Fernandes then became the first European to see the Gibe River, crossing the river as he left Ennarea, and later described it as carrying "more Water than the Nile". They then travelled through the Kingdom of Janjero, then across the Omo to the Kingdom of Kambaata where they were detained for two days at Sangara.

Upon reaching the ruler of Kambaata, Hamalmal, they found another Ethiopian Christian named Manquer, had arrived and claimed that Fernandes and his companions were to return to Susenyos' court. All three parties – Hamalmal, Fernandes, and Manquer – sent to Susenyos for instructions. The ruler of Kambaata detained Manquer, waited three months for Susenyos' reply, and found that the Emperor desired Fernandes to continue his journey south; Hamalmal detained Manquer and Fernandes and his party continued to the land of the Alaba. Their ruler, Aliko, was initially cool to this party, and when Manquer arrived to obstruct their journey, he imprisoned the party, where several of the Portuguese died. A council was then held, which decided to return the survivors to Kambaata, whence they returned to Gorgora, according to Bruce, "without any sort of advantage to themselves."

Fernandes translated various liturgical books into Ethiopian, and was the author of ascetical and polemical works against the other faiths prevalent in Ethiopia.

Susenyos, years later, converted to Catholicism in 1622, after the arrival of Afonso Mendes, the Latin Patriarch of Ethiopia. Fernandes at this time became superior of the mission to Ethiopia, though his advice was often ignored. Susenyos publicly acknowledged the primacy of the Roman See and made Catholicism the state religion in 1626. For a time conversions were made, the monarch resorting to compulsion. However the Emperor's son, Fasilides, sided with the native church, and after his father's death restored the former faith proscribing the Catholic religion under the penalty of death.

The missionaries, on their expulsion, found a temporary protector in one of the petty princes of the country, by whom, however, they were soon abandoned. Those who reached the port of Massowah were held for a ransom. Fernandes, then over seventy years of age, was one of those detained as hostage, but a younger companion persuaded the pasha to substitute him, and Fernandes was allowed to return to India, where he ended his days.
