= Trypanosomiasis vaccine =

Efforts to develop a vaccine for trypanosomiasis

A Trypanosomiasis vaccine is a vaccine against trypanosomiasis. No effective vaccine currently exists, but development of a vaccine is the subject of current research.

The Gates Foundation has been involved in funding research conducted by the Sabin Vaccine Institute and others.

There are many obstacles to development of such a vaccine. One obstacle is variant surface glycoprotein, which makes it difficult for the immune system to recognize the infectious organism. Also, Trypanosoma brucei has a direct inhibitory effect upon B cells.

It has been suggested that these challenges could be overcome by a vaccine against the initial antigens, or generating an immune response against the cysteine protease (for example, cruzipain).

An effective vaccine was achieved in 2021 using a mouse model of infection with Trypanosoma vivax.

== See also ==
- Eradication of infectious diseases § African trypanosomiasis
- Trypanocidal agent
