= Trypanotolerance =

Ability to live with parasites

A trypanotolerant organism is one which is relatively less affected by trypanosome infestation.

== By host ==
=== In livestock ===
Some breeds are known for their trypanotolerance. This is especially important in Africa where a few particular trypanosomes are major economic and agricultural pests.

==== Trypanotolerant livestock breeds ====
- N'Dama cattle
- West African Dwarf goats
- West African Dwarf sheep (Djallonké)
- Cameroon sheep

=== N'Dama cattle and West African Dwarf sheep and goats ===
Certain domestic ruminant breeds in sub-saharan Africa show remarkable resistance to the effects of African trypanosomiasis: they can tolerate the parasites' presence while controlling parasitaemia levels and do not show the severe anemia and production loss that are typical of infection in susceptible breeds.

The trypanotolerance trait is seen in N'Dama cattle, and it refers to the N'Dama cattle's ability to survive in areas with high tsetse fly endemicity, where other cattle breeds would frequently contract trypanosomiasis. In areas or locations of low to moderate tsetse fly challenge, typanotolerant N'Dama cattle show lower numbers of parasites in their blood, develop less severe anemia and have also been shown to be more productive.

An investigation to test the resistance of different small ruminant breeds (West African dwarf sheep and goats) to an artificial infection with T. congolense revealed that native sheep and goats had a higher natural resistance to the illness than exotic breeds, with exotic/indigenous crossbreeds falling somewhere in between. Despite persistent parasitaemia, clinical signs in trypanotolerant West African dwarf sheep and goats revealed a milder illness with lower mortality. The significance of these trypanotolerant traits is highlighted when choosing breeds of sheep and goats for selection programs. Some literature claims that trypanotolerance in small ruminants (sheep and goats) should be viewed as resilience rather than resistance because it is less apparent than in cattle.

Trypanotolerance appears to include both non-immunological and immunological pathways and is most likely multifactorial. However, physiological and nutritional factors, concurrent diseases, the presence and absence of tsetse, and inter-current diseases all have an impact on the level of resistance displayed by typanotolerant breeds of cattle, sheep, and goats.

In addition to the above-listed criteria, studies have shown that the effective dose of the trypanosome parasite that these animals acquire following the bite of the tsetse fly is also a consideration. It only takes one fly bite to transmit the infection. The quantity of trypanosomes injected into an animal's skin as a result of bites determines how severe the sickness will be; thus, trypanotolerance during natural exposure may be influenced by lower infective dosages. The finding that some cattle that are highly resistant in the field don't always retain that level of resistance after being artificially infected with a specific dose of the parasite may be supportive of this hypothesis.

==== History of genetic research ====
Trypanotolerance had previously been achieved through normal livestock breeding in cattle, but genetic analysis was becoming a serious option in the 1980s. The effort that would eventually bear fruit began with a conversation between Peter Brumby – then at the International Livestock Centre for Africa – and Morris Soller in 1985. This was followed by the opening of the short-lived International Trypanotolerance Center in the Gambia in 1987 with a seminar on the genome mapping project that would continue beyond the Center itself. The project was then actually completed by the ILRI – the successor to the ILCA – in 2003.
