= Quinapyramine =

Chemical compound

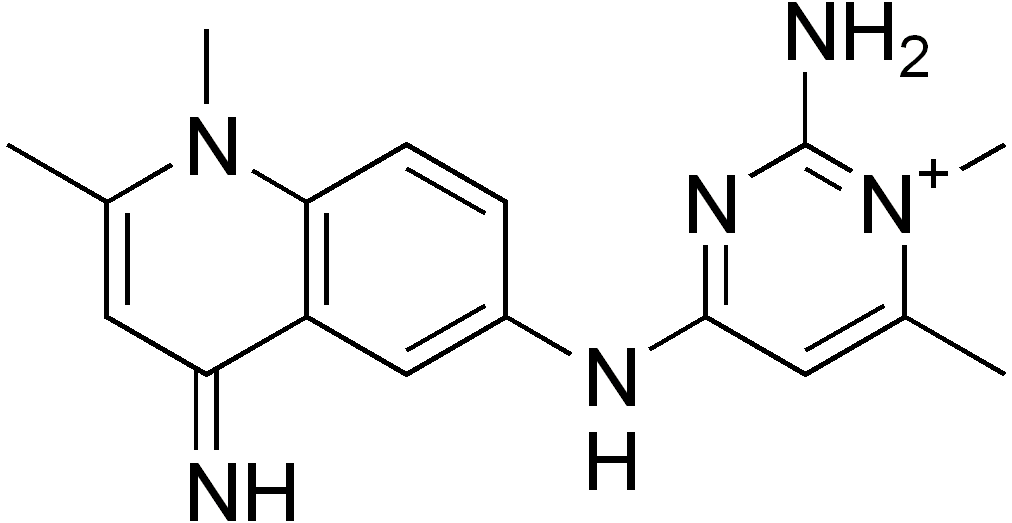

Clinical data
- ATCvet code: QP51DX05 (WHO)

Identifiers
- IUPAC name: N'-(4-imino-1,2-dimethyl-6-quinolyl)-1,6-dimethylpyrimidin-1-ium-2,4-diamine
- CAS Number: 20493-41-8
- PubChem CID: 5351805
- ChemSpider: 4508792
- UNII: B2NT1100WR
- CompTox Dashboard (EPA): DTXSID90942667

Chemical and physical data
- Formula: C_{17}H_{21}N_{6}^{+}
- Molar mass: 309.397 g·mol^{−1}
- 3D model (JSmol): Interactive image
- SMILES: CC1=CC(=N)C2=C(N1C)C=CC(=C2)NC3=NC(=[N+](C(=C3)C)C)N
- InChI: InChI=1S/C17H20N6/c1-10-7-14(18)13-9-12(5-6-15(13)22(10)3)20-16-8-11(2)23(4)17(19)21-16/h5-9,18H,1-4H3,(H2,19,20,21)/p+1/b18-14+; Key:KMJWBVJQFGRCEB-NBVRZTHBSA-O

Quinapyramine is a trypanocidal agent for veterinary use.
