= Diminazene =

Anti-parasite drug with a di-amidine

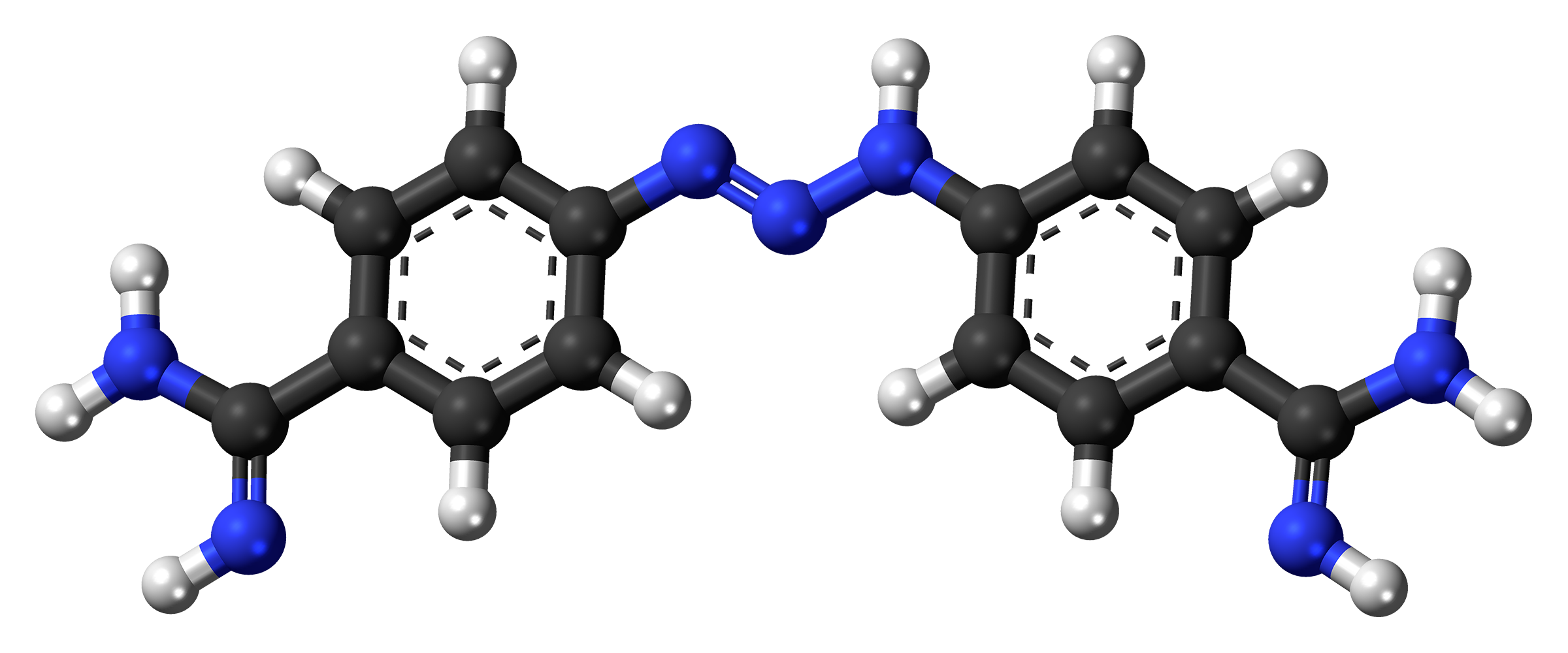

Clinical data
- Trade names: Azidin, Berenil, Ganasag, Pirocide
- Other names: 4,4'-(1-Triazene-1,3-diyl)bis(benzenecarboximidamide)
- Routes of administration: IM, SC
- ATCvet code: QP51DF01 (WHO)

Legal status
- Legal status: Veterinary use only

Identifiers
- IUPAC name: 4-[2-(4-Carbamimidoylphenyl)iminohydrazinyl]benzenecarboximidamide
- CAS Number: 536-71-0; aceturate: 908-54-3
- PubChem CID: 2354
- ChemSpider: 2264
- UNII: Y5G36EEA5Z; aceturate: JI8SAD85NO
- ChEBI: CHEBI:81724
- ChEMBL: ChEMBL124025
- CompTox Dashboard (EPA): DTXSID7043792
- ECHA InfoCard: 100.007.860

Chemical and physical data
- Formula: C_{14}H_{15}N_{7}
- Molar mass: 281.323 g·mol^{−1}
- 3D model (JSmol): Interactive image
- SMILES: C1=CC(=CC=C1C(=N)N)N/N=N/C2=CC=C(C=C2)C(=N)N
- InChI: InChI=1S/C14H15N7/c15-13(16)9-1-5-11(6-2-9)19-21-20-12-7-3-10(4-8-12)14(17)18/h1-8H,(H3,15,16)(H3,17,18)(H,19,20); Key:XNYZHCFCZNMTFY-UHFFFAOYSA-N

Diminazene (INN; also known as diminazen) is an anti-infective medication for animals that is sold under a variety of brand names. It is effective against certain protozoa such as Babesia, Trypanosoma, and Cytauxzoon. The drug may also be effective against certain bacteria including Brucella and Streptococcus. Chemically it is a di-amidine and it is formulated as its aceturate salt, diminazene aceturate.

The mechanism is not well understood; it probably inhibits DNA replication, but also has affinity to RNA. The drug is known to change the structure of kinetoplast DNA in the Trypanosoma cruzi parasite, which causes Chagas' disease. In particular, kinetoplasts from parasites exposed to the drug have more densely linked minicircles, leading to the formation of fibers within the networks.

== Side effects ==
Acute side effects include vomiting, diarrhea, and hypotension (low blood pressure). Diminazen can harm the liver, kidneys and brain, which is potentially life-threatening; camels are especially susceptible to these effects.

== Resistance ==
Drug resistance, or at least evidence of treatment failure, has been reported in several countries in Africa. For example, the Gibe River Valley in southwest Ethiopia showed universal resistance between July 1989 and February 1993. This likely indicates a permanent loss of function in this area against the tested target, T. congolense isolated from Boran cattle.
