= AEE788 =

Chemical compound

Identifiers
- IUPAC name: 6-[4-[(4-Ethylpiperazin-1-yl)methyl]phenyl]-N-[(1R)-1-phenylethyl]-7H-pyrrolo[2,3-d]pyrimidin-4-amine
- CAS Number: 497839-62-0
- PubChem CID: 10297043
- IUPHAR/BPS: 7643
- ChemSpider: 8472511
- UNII: F9JLR95I3I
- ChEBI: CHEBI:40629
- ChEMBL: ChEMBL587723
- CompTox Dashboard (EPA): DTXSID90964400

Chemical and physical data
- Formula: C_{27}H_{32}N_{6}
- Molar mass: 440.595 g·mol^{−1}
- 3D model (JSmol): Interactive image
- SMILES: CCN1CCN(CC1)CC2=CC=C(C=C2)C3=CC4=C(N3)N=CN=C4N[C@H](C)C5=CC=CC=C5
- InChI: InChI=1S/C27H32N6/c1-3-32-13-15-33(16-14-32)18-21-9-11-23(12-10-21)25-17-24-26(28-19-29-27(24)31-25)30-20(2)22-7-5-4-6-8-22/h4-12,17,19-20H,3,13-16,18H2,1-2H3,(H2,28,29,30,31)/t20-/m1/s1; Key:OONFNUWBHFSNBT-HXUWFJFHSA-N

AEE788 is a multitargeted human epidermal receptor (HER) 1/2 and vascular endothelial growth factor receptor (VEGFR) 1/2 receptor family tyrosine kinases inhibitor with IC_{50} of 2, 6, 77, 59 nM for EGFR, ErbB2, KDR, and Flt-1. In cells, growth factor-induced EGFR and ErbB2 phosphorylation was also efficiently inhibited with IC_{50}s of 11 and 220 nM, respectively. It efficiently inhibited growth factor-induced EGFR and ErbB2 phosphorylation in tumors for >72 h, a phenomenon correlating with the antitumor efficacy of intermittent treatment schedules. It also inhibits VEGF-induced angiogenesis in a murine implant model. It has potential as an anticancer agent targeting deregulated tumor cell proliferation as well as angiogenic parameters.

== The IC50 value of AEE788 against of different kinases ==
| Kinase | IC_{50}(nM) |
|---|---|
| EGFR ICD | 2 |
| ErbB2(HER-2) | 6 |
| ErbB4 (HER-4) | 160 |
| KDR | 77 |
| Tek | 2100 |
| IGF1-R | >10000 |
| Ins-R | >10000 |
| PDGFR-beta | 320 |
| c-Met | 2900 |
| c-Abl | 52 |
| c-Src | 61 |
| c-Kit | 790 |
| RET | 740 |
| c-Fms | 60 |
| Flt-1 | 59 |
| Flt-3 | 730 |
| Flt-4 | 330 |
| Cdk1/Cyc.B | 8000 |
| PKC-alpha | >10000 |
| c-Raf-1 | 2800 |
| PKA | >10000 |

== The data of antiproliferative activity of AEE788 ==
| Cell line | IC_{50}(nM) |
|---|---|
| NCI-H596 | 78 |
| MK | 56 |
| BT-474 | 49 |
| SK-BR-3 | 381 |
| 32D/EGFR | 300 |
| 32D/EGFRvIII | 10 |
| MCF-7 | 2500 |
| MCF-7/EGFRvIII | <5000 |
| T24 | 4526 |
