= Propidium monoazide =

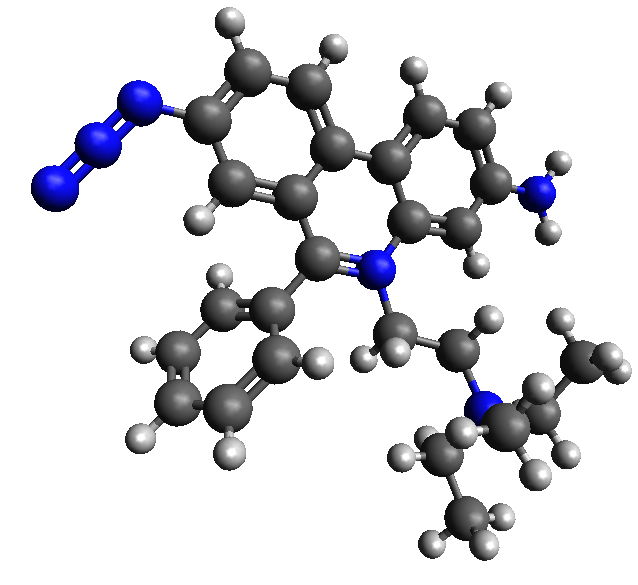

Names
- IUPAC name 3-Amino-8-azido-5-{3-[diethyl(methyl)ammonio]propyl}-6-phenylphenanthridinium

Identifiers
3D model (JSmol)	Interactive image
ChemSpider	2299748
PubChem CID	3035529
CompTox Dashboard (EPA)	DTXSID301045686
- InChI: InChI=1S/C27H31N6/c1-4-33(3,5-2)17-9-16-32-26-18-21(28)12-14-24(26)23-15-13-22(30-31-29)19-25(23)27(32)20-10-7-6-8-11-20/h6-8,10-15,18-19,28H,4-5,9,16-17H2,1-3H3/q+1/p+1 Key: DXHWIAMGTKXUEA-UHFFFAOYSA-O; InChI=1/C27H31N6/c1-4-33(3,5-2)17-9-16-32-26-18-21(28)12-14-24(26)23-15-13-22(30-31-29)19-25(23)27(32)20-10-7-6-8-11-20/h6-8,10-15,18-19,28H,4-5,9,16-17H2,1-3H3/q+1/p+1 Key: DXHWIAMGTKXUEA-IKLDFBCSAS
- SMILES: [N-]=[N+]=N\c3ccc2c1ccc(N)cc1[n+](c(c2c3)c4ccccc4)CCC[N+](CC)(CC)C

Properties
Chemical formula	C_{27}H_{32}N_{6}^{2+}
Molar mass	440.582 g/mol
- Except where otherwise noted, data are given for materials in their standard state (at 25 °C [77 °F], 100 kPa). Infobox references

Propidium monoazide (PMA) is a photoreactive DNA-binding dye that preferentially binds to dsDNA. It is used to detect viable microorganisms by qPCR. Visible light (high power halogen lamps or specific LED devices) induces a photoreaction of the chemical that will lead to a covalent bond with PMA and the dsDNA. The mechanism of DNA modification by PMA can be seen in this protocol. This process renders the DNA insoluble and results in its loss during subsequent genomic DNA extraction. Theoretically, dead microorganisms lose their capability to maintain their membranes intact, which leaves the "naked" DNA in the cytosol ready to react with PMA. DNA of living organisms are not exposed to the PMA, as they have an intact cell membrane. After treatment with the chemical, only the DNA from living bacteria is usable in qPCR, allowing to obtain only the amplified DNA of living organisms. This is helpful in determining which pathogens are active in specific samples. The main use of PMA is in Viability PCR but the same principle can be applied in flow cytometry or fluorescence microscopy.

However, the ability of PMA in differentiating viable and non-viable cells varies for different bacteria. An example is that the permeability of PMA to gram-positive and gram-negative cell membranes is different. Therefore, the application of PMA to mixed communities is still limited.

PMA was developed at Biotium, Inc. as an improvement on ethidium monoazide (EMA). PMA provides better discrimination between live and dead bacteria because it is excluded from live cells more efficiently than EMA.
