= Edgar Crookshank =

English physician and microbiologist

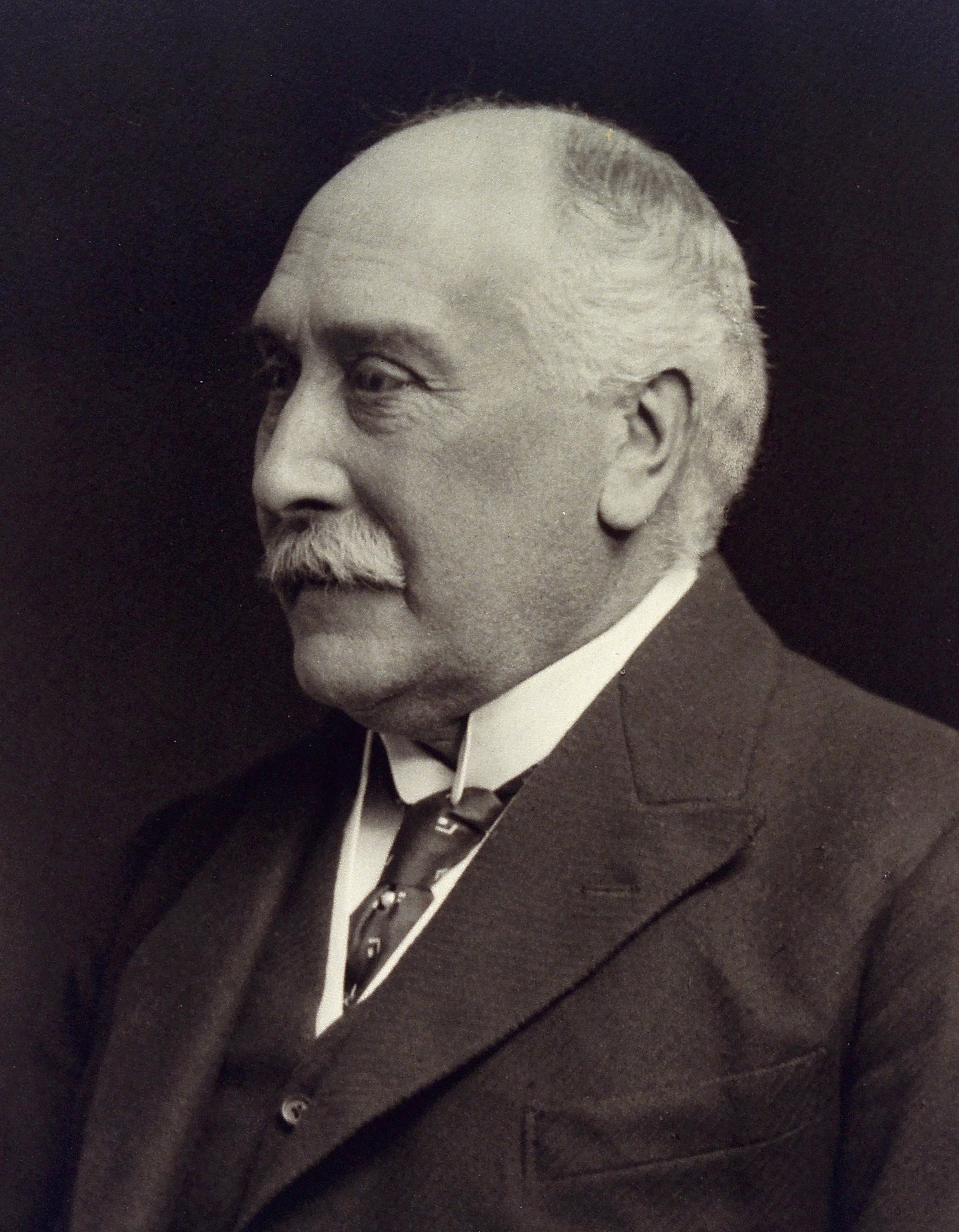
Edgar March Crookshank

Edgar March Crookshank (2 October 1858 – 1 July 1928) was an English physician and microbiologist.

== Biography ==
Crookshank studied at King's College London and qualified for medicine in 1881. He served briefly as an assistant to Joseph Lister, a physician noted for his work promoting antiseptics and sterile surgery. In 1882, Crookshank served as a doctor with the British armed forces sent to Egypt as a result of the Urabi Revolt; he was decorated for his service at the Battle of Tel el-Kebir.

On return from Egypt, Crookshank toured Europe in 1884 for further medical training. In Berlin, he visited the laboratory of Robert Koch and learned methods of isolating bacterial strains to investigate infectious diseases.

When he returned to London, Crookshank wrote a textbook, An Introduction to Practical Bacteriology Based on the Methods of Koch, which was published in 1886. Subsequent editions were published under differing titles in 1887, 1890 and 1896, and a French translation by H. Bergeaud was published in Paris as soon as 1886.

In 1885, Crookshank founded one of the world's first bacteriological laboratories for human and veterinary pathology in London.

Crookshank was also interested in the use of photography to study bacteria and published Photography of Bacteria in 1887, the first text in English devoted solely to the photography of bacteria. In the introduction to this book he wrote that the photographs were "intended to convince scoffers of the essential truth of the new Science, that specific, often morphologically distinct, microorganisms were the cause of particular infectious diseases".

During this time he became interested in the study of infectious diseases in animals and in 1886 was awarded the chair of Comparative Pathology and Bacteriology at King's College London. In his new role he was asked to investigate an outbreak of cowpox in Lechlade, Gloucestershire.

His investigations led him to reconsider the use of cowpox-derived vaccines to immunize against smallpox, a treatment developed by Edward Jenner nearly a hundred years earlier. His conclusion was that such vaccines were ineffective in preventing smallpox because the two diseases (cowpox and smallpox) were "totally distinct". Instead of a cowpox-derived vaccine, he advocated the use of a more dangerous vaccination using attenuated smallpox. In 1889, he published a two-volume treatise on the subject, A History and Pathology of Vaccination. Vaccination policies were a divisive topic at the time and in the ensuing controversy that resulted from his publication, Crookshank quit his chair at King's College London in 1891. He continued to speak out on health matters, but never worked in a laboratory again. He subsequently, however, focused on the encouragement of agricultural and veterinary science, serving as a governor of the Royal Veterinary College until his death.

In 1894, Crookshank was appointed Justice of the Peace for Sussex, and in 1906 stood unsuccessfully as East Grinstead's parliamentary candidate as a Unionist and tariff reformer. In later life, he travelled extensively in the Dominions, becoming a skilled big-game hunter and deputy chairman of two Scottish-Australian corporations.

== Publications ==
- History and Pathology of Vaccination, Volume 1, Nabu Press, 2010, ISBN 978-1-144-96409-0
- A Textbook of Bacteriology: Including the Etiology and Prevention of Infective Diseases and a Short Account of Yeasts and Moulds, Haematoza, and Psorosperms, Nabu Press, 2010, ISBN 978-1-174-75161-5
- Photography of Bacteria, General Books LLC, 2010, ISBN 978-1-4588-4154-4
- Manual of Bacteriology, Nabu Press, 2010, ISBN 978-1-146-49003-0

== Sources ==
- Professor Crookshank, Obituary, The Times, 3 Jul 1928.
- Mortimer, Philip P (1999). "The bacteria craze of the 1880s". The Lancet. 353 (9152): 581–584. doi:10.1016/s0140-6736(98)08519-5. PMID 10029000.
- "Edgar March Crookshank, M.B." British Medical Journal. 2 (3523): 79. 14 July 1928. doi:10.1136/bmj.2.3523.79. PMC 2456183. PMID 20774024.
