= Trypanosoma congolense =

Scientific classification
- Domain: Eukaryota
- Phylum: Euglenozoa
- Class: Kinetoplastea
- Order: Trypanosomatida
- Family: Trypanosomatidae
- Genus: Trypanosoma
- Subgenus: Nannomonas
- Species: T. congolense

Binomial name
- Trypanosoma congolense Broden, 1904

Synonyms
- Trypanosoma dimorphon Laveran & Mesnil, 1904; Trypanosoma nanum Laveran, 1905; Trypanosom confusum Montgomery & Kinghorn, 1909; Trypanosoma montgomeryi Laveran, 1909; Trypanosoma pecorum Bruce et al., 1910; Trypanosoma frobeniusi Weissenborn, 1911; Trypanosoma somaliense Maroglio, 1911; Trypanosoma cellii Martogio, 1911; Trypaonsoms multiforme Kinghorne et al., 1913; Trypaonson randae van Saceghem, 1921; Trypanosoma urundiense Chardome & Peel, 1967; Trypanosoma berghei Chardome & Peel, 1967; Trypanosoma mossosense Chardom & Peel, 1967

Protozoan parasite, cause of nagana

Trypanosoma congolense is a species of trypanosomes and is the major pathogen responsible for the disease nagana in cattle and other animals including sheep, pigs, goats, horses and camels, dogs, as well as laboratory mice. It is the most common cause of nagana in east Africa, but is also a major cause of nagana in west Africa. This parasite is spread by tsetse flies. In its mammalian host, Trypanosoma congolense only lives in blood vessels, and causes in particular anaemia.

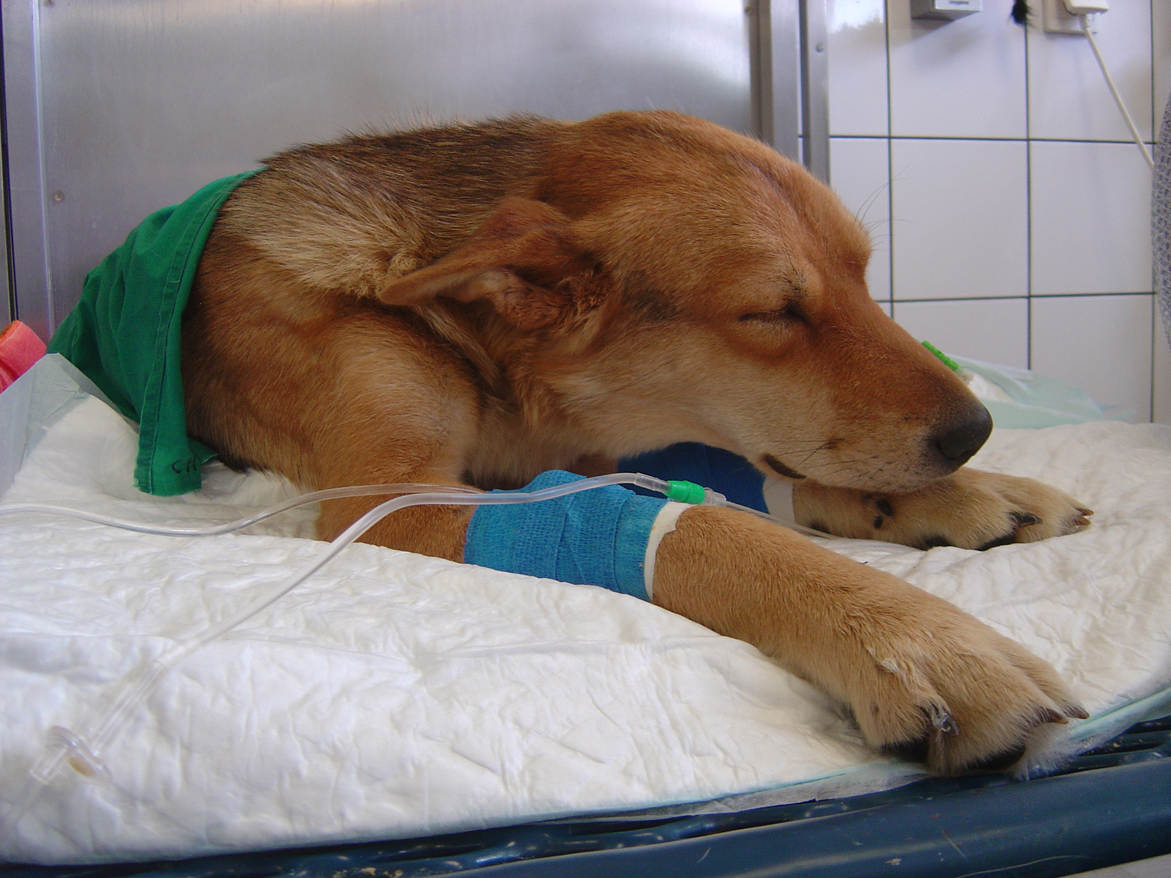
Cachexic dog infested with T. congolense after travel in West Africa

== Infection process ==
T. congolense causes anemia. Nok et al., 2003 find T. congolense to alter the surfaces of erythrocytes which may contribute to this effect.

== Drug resistance ==
Individuals isolated from Boran cattle in the Gibe River Valley in southwest Ethiopia showed universal resistance between July 1989 and February 1993. This likely indicates a permanent loss of function in this area for the tested trypanocides, diminazene aceturate, isometamidium chloride, and homidium chloride.
