= Boran cattle =

Breed of cattle

Boran
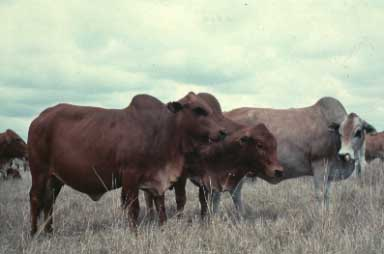
- Boran cattle in Kenya
- Country of origin: Kenya, Ethiopia, and Somalia
- Use: Beef

Traits
- Weight: Male: 650–850 kilograms (1,430–1,870 lb); Female: 350–500 kilograms (770–1,100 lb)
- Coat: White, fawn, red, black, Bont
- Cattle; Bos (primigenius) indicus

Boran cattle are a popular Zebu beef breed in eastern Africa.

Through DNA sampling, Hanotte et al. have analyzed the genetic make-up of the Boran and it consists of the following genetic proportions—64% Bos indicus, 24% European Bos taurus and 12% African Bos taurus.

== History ==
Kenyan Boran cattle were developed from the native shorthorned Zebu cattle of the Borana Oromo people of southern Ethiopia. They are usually white or fawn, with the bulls being darker with black point. Their great similarity to the American Brahman cattle is not without basis, they are also descended from cattle from the western coast of India, only much earlier.

Since 1951, the Boran Cattle Breeders' Society has been managed and strategically breeding Boran cattle in Kenya. As of 2008, there were approximately 454 beef ranches in the country, which can be classified based on ownership as one of five categories: group ranches, private company ranches, co-operative ranches, public company ranches, and government ranches.

== Physical characteristics ==
Having been in Africa for over a thousand years, they are very well adapted to local conditions and parasites. Boran cattle are known for their fertility, early maturation (more so than other Zebu breeds), hardiness, and docility.

=== Types ===
The Orma Boran is the smallest of the Boran breeds, smaller than the Kenyan Boran. Mature male Orma Boran range in size from 225 to 395 kilograms (496 to 871 lb), while females are from 250 to 355 kilograms (551 to 783 lb).

The Kenyan Boran developed from the Orma Boran, Borana, and Somali Boran. The Kenyan Boran is differentiated from other Boran due to its size and well-developed hindquarters. Mature male Kenyan Boran range in size from 550 to 850 kilograms (1,213 to 1,874 lb), while females are from 400 to 550 kilograms (882 to 1,213 lb). The Kenyan Boran coat colour is usually white with spots, but brown and red coat colours have also been found.

== Parasites ==
Boran have very little trypanotolerance, although surprisingly they do carry a few alleles which are specific to Boran and could be useful for introgression into other breeds. As Boran are not entirely derived from extra-African forebears, and have spent some of their formation time as a breed within Africa, it is possible that this is the result of selection against trypanosomiasis challenge.
