= Gibe River =

River in Ethiopia

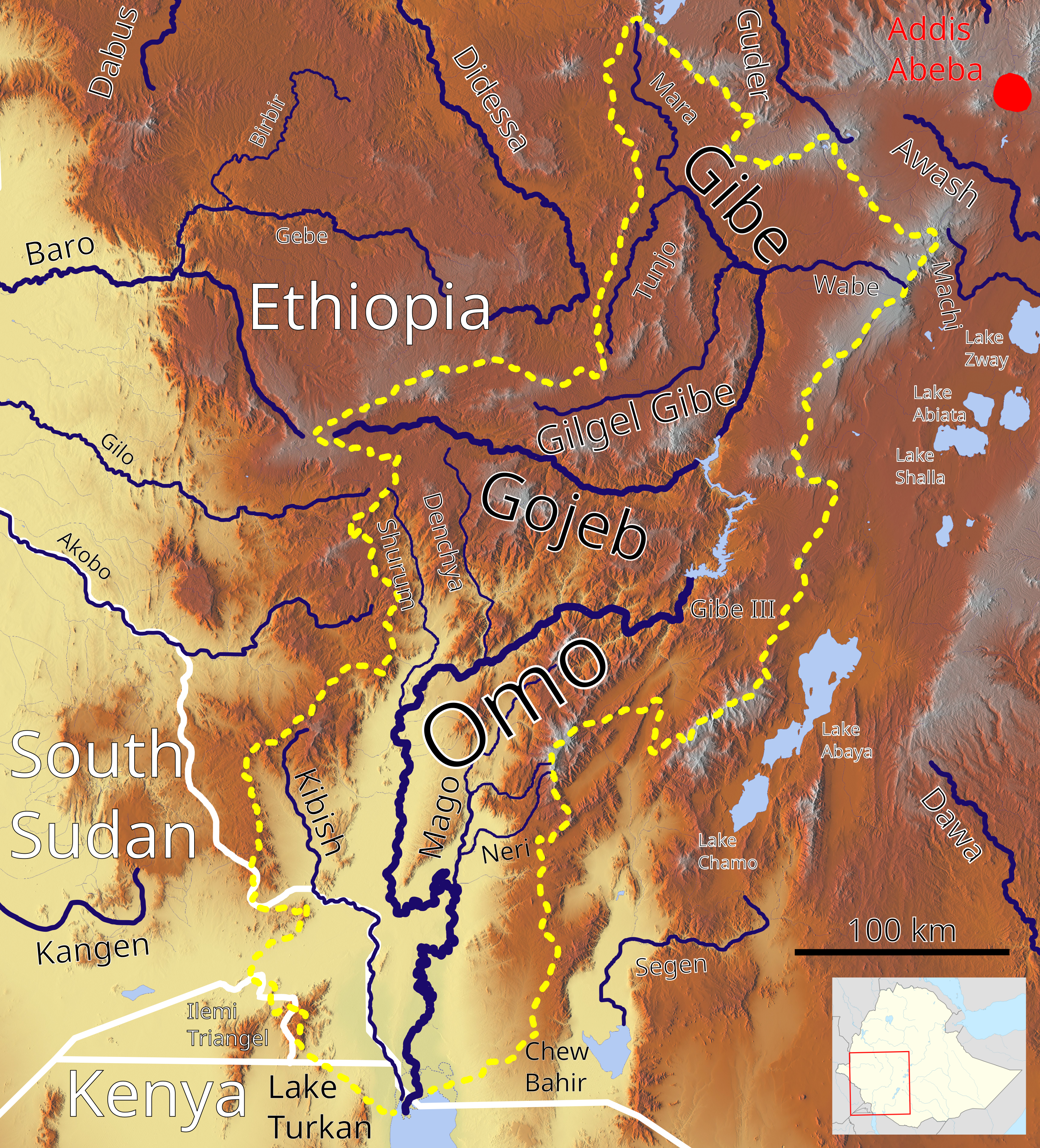
Map showing the Omo basin, with the Gibe River (Top right)

The Gibe River (also Great Gibe River) is by far the largest tributary of the Omo River in southwestern Ethiopia and flows generally south-southeast. The confluence of the Gibe River 7°20′N 37°22′E with the Gojeb River forms the Omo River. The whole drainage basin is sometimes referred to as the Omo-Gibe River Basin with the Gibe and the Omo draining the (respectively) upper and lower reaches.

In common with most of Ethiopia's rivers, the Gibe is not navigable.

== Overview ==
The Gibe rises at an elevation of about 2,200 m north of Bila town, west of the Chomen swamp from Gudeya Bila woreda, which is located in the East Welega Zone, Oromia Region. The river then flows generally to the southeast towards its confluence with the Gojeb River. Its tributaries include the Amara, Alanga, and Gilgel Gibe rivers. The southern drainage area of the Gibe includes the Gibe region, site of a number of historic kingdoms of the Oromo and the Sidama people. The Gibe River terminates at an elevation of 830 m, at its confluence with the Gojeb River, thus forming the Omo River.

Although its banks and watershed have been inhabited since time since prehistoric times, the Gabe is first mentioned in the Royal Chronicle of Emperor Sarsa Dengel, who campaigned in the north of the region in 1566. The first recorded European to see the Gibe was the Portuguese Jesuit missionary António Fernandes, who crossed the Gibe in 1613 as he left Ennarea and entered Janjero. Fernandes later described the Gibe as carrying "more Water than the Nile". The Gibe would not be visited again by Europeans until the 19th century, so Fernandes' account remained authoritative and was preferred over information obtained from native travellers.
