= List of sterile insect technique trials =

The sterile insect technique (SIT) is an environmentally friendly method for the biological control of pests using area-wide inundative release of sterile insects to reduce reproduction in a field population of the same species (IPPC, 2007). SIT technique may be applied as part of an area-wide control (integrated pest management) approach of insects of medical, veterinary, and agricultural importance. It was in 1937 when Edward Knipling proposed using sterilization to control or eradicate insect pests after observation that screwworm fly males mate repeatedly while females mate only once. He then made the hypothesis that if large numbers of sterile males could repeatedly be released into wild populations, it would eventually eliminate population reproduction and lead to eradication.

This table is a list of sterile insect technique trials worldwide.

Target	Year	Location	Method	Outcome
Tsetse fly	1944–1946	Tanzania	Release of Glossina morsitans centralis into a Glossina swynnertoni population	Hybrid males were sterile and the female hybrids partially sterile. 99% suppression in 26 km^{2}
Cochliomyia hominivorax	1951	United States: Sanibel Island (47 km^{2}), Florida and China	Release 39 sterile male flies per km^{2} per week for several weeks	Field evaluation pilot test. Resulted in up to 100% sterility of the egg masses, greatly reduced the wild population, incomplete eradication because of the wild fertile flies flying from the mainland.
Cochliomyia hominivorax	1954	Netherlands Antilles: Curaçao (435 km^{2})	Released 155 sterile males per km^{2} per week	100% egg sterility after 2 generations. Evident eradication was accomplished within 14 weeks. Releases were stopped after 22 weeks.
Cochliomyia hominivorax	1958–1959	United States: Florida	Release 155–1160 sterile flies per km^{2} per week	Eradication. Total cost was $11M, about 50% of the annual losses.
Cochliomyia hominivorax	1962–1966	United States: Texas and western states	Release 200–1000 sterile flies per km^{2} per week	Declared eradication in Texas and New Mexico in 1964 and in the entire USA in 1966. Thereafter, the program goal changed to population containment from the initial eradication
Cochliomyia hominivorax	1984–2001	Central America	Sterile flies release	Declared eradication in Mexico, 1991, Guatemala, 1994, El Salvador 1995, Honduras 1996, Nicaragua 1999, Costa Rica 2000, Panama, 2001
Cochliomyia hominivorax	1990–1992	Libya	Release 40 million sterile flies per week	Operated by a joint FAO/IAEA Division. Only 6 instances of wounds infested with screwworm larvae were found in 1991, compared with more than 12000 cases in 1990. Eradication was declared in June 1992
Mexican fruit fly	1964–current	United States: Southern California and Texas	For eradication, release 96,000 and 61,500 sterile flies per km^{2} per week in CA and TX, respectively	Started to eradicate in CA in 1964 and to exclude in TX a decade later. Continued as containment program
Bactrocera tryoni	1962–	Australia	Released 1600 million sterile flies in 1990. For containment method, release 60,000 sterile flies per km^{2} for 12 weeks after catching the last wild fly.	Field trials began in 1962. Population was suppressed strongly, but not eradicated because of long-range immigrants. Eradication was achieved in Western Australia in 1990. Since the mid-1990s, it has been used as containment method.
Ceratitis capitata	1978–	Mexico and Guatemala	Produced 500 million and 3,500 million sterile flies per week in Mexico and Guatemala, respectively	First large-scale fruit fly AW-IPM program using SIT. Eradication in 1982. For over 25 years, this program kept Mexico, the US, and half of Guatemala free of the pest. Genetic sexing strains were later introduced.
Melon fly	1972–1993	Japan	Released up to 4 million sterile fly pupae per week, total 264 million during the pilot test. Total 50,000 million sterile flies were released.	A pilot experiment began in 1972 and eradication was declared in 1978. An operation program started in 1984. Complete eradication achieved in 1993.
Ceratitis capitata	1980s–	Israel	Released males	Genetic sexing strain
Ceratitis capitata	1994–	United States: California and Florida	Release sterile males of the tsl sexing strain VIENNA 7	Started as eradication program. It was successful and cost-effective and thereafter (1996) applied as a permanent preventative program in CA, FL, and Guatemala.
Ceratitis capitata	1997–	Jordan-Israel-Palestine	Released genetic sexing strain VIENNA 7	As population suppression rather than eradication
Onion maggot	1981–	Netherlands	Sterile insects are provided from a private source	The program has not been able to expand beyond 16% of the onion production area due to free-riders. Ongoing long-term suppression program over 20 years
Tsetse fly	1970–1990s	Burkina Faso (3,000 km^{2}), Nigeria (1,500 km^{2}) and Tanzania (1,650 km^{2})	Combination method with attractant traps and insecticides	Eradication
Tsetse fly	1990s	Uganda	Autosterilization of wild flies	Suppression
Anopheles quadrimaculatus	1959–1960	United States: Florida	Release adult males after sterilizing in pupal stage. 430,000 males over 48 wks at 2 locations	Poor competitiveness. No population reduction.
Culex quinquefasciatus	1967	Myanmar: Okpo	Release 5000 daily for 9 wks. Sterility from cytoplasmic incompatibility	Population eliminated
Culex quinquefasciatus	1969	United States: Florida	Release 930,000 males over 12 wks after chemosterilization with thiotepa	Population suppressed and eliminated partially due to the sterile males released
Culex pipiens	1970	France	Release hundreds of thousands over 8 wks after sterilizing with chromosome translocation	Population reduced due to the persistent translocation
Culex quinquefasciatus	1973	India: Delhi	Release 300,000 sterile males daily over 14 wks, total 23 million. Sterilization with cytoplasmic incompatibility, and chromosome translocation.	Population reduced due to the established sterility from cytoplasmic incompatibility and translocation.
Culex quinquefasciatus	1973	India: Delhi	Release total 38 million sterile males over 25 wks. Chemoterilization with thiotepa.	Up to 90% sterile eggs, but no clear population suppression due to immigration
Aedes aegypti	1974	Kenya: Mombasa	Release 57,000 genetically modified males over 10 wks. Sterilization with chromosome translocation	Partial sterility, but no long-term persistent translocation
Anopheles albimanus	1972	El Salvador: Lake Apastepeque	Released 4.4 million sterile males over 22 wks. Chemosterilization of genetic sexing strain pupae with bisazir.	100% sterility induced in wild population. Well below detection level after 5 months.
Anopheles albimanus	1977–1979	El Salvador: Pacific coast	Released 100s million males. Bisazir sterilization. Use genetic sexing strain (MACHO).	Target field population was reduced by 97%, but eradication prevented by unexpected immigration.
Culex tarsalis	1981	United States: California	Released 85,000 males over 8 wks after sterilizing with adult irradiation	Assortative mating was observed, but no population reduction.
Cockchafers	1959, 1962	Switzerland	Released 3,109 and 8,594 males after radiation sterilization.	Field trials. The population was reduced by 80% and 100%.
Boll weevil	1971–1973	United States: Mississippi	Combined methods of insecticide and SIT	Large pilot field experiment. Population was suppressed below detection levels in 203 of 236 fields. The remainder were close to uncontrolled area (less than 40 km).
Sweetpotato weevil	1994–1999	Japan	Released sterile weevils after insecticide application.	Complete eradication
Lepidoptera	1994	Canada: British Columbia	Released irradiated codling moths	As a population suppression method
Aedes albopictus	2012	Reunion Island	Semi field condition test using the sterilizing dose of 40 Gy with cesium-137 irradiator	two-fold reduction of the wild population's fertility
Aedes aegypti	2017-2018	Queensland, Australia	Released >3 million males sterilized with the natural bacteria Wolbachia	80% reduction of the population in trial areas

== See also ==
- Genetically modified insect
- Insect ecology
