= 2026 United States New World Screwworm outbreak =

Animal disease outbreak in the United States

An outbreak of New World Screwworm in the United States began in 2026.

The outbreak threatens the cattle industry in Texas.

== Cases ==
As of October 29, 2026, there are 74 confirmed NWS cases in the US.

2026 Table of NWS Cases in the United States
Confirmed Date	State	County	Case Type	Animal Type	Species
June 3, 2026	Texas	Zavala	Domestic	Domestic	Cattle
June 5, 2026	Texas	Zavala	Domestic	Domestic	Cattle
June 7, 2026	Texas	La Salle	Domestic	Domestic	Cattle
June 7, 2026	New Mexico	Lea	Domestic	Domestic	Dog
June 8, 2026	Texas	La Salle	Domestic	Domestic	Cattle
June 8, 2026	Texas	Gillespie	Domestic	Domestic	Goats
June 9, 2026	Texas	Edwards	Domestic	Domestic	Cattle
June 11, 2026	Texas	Zavala	Domestic	Domestic	Cattle
June 11, 2026	Texas	Tom Green	Domestic	Domestic	Cattle
June 11, 2026	Texas	Edwards	Domestic	Domestic	Cattle
June 11, 2026	Texas	Edwards	Domestic	Domestic	Goats
June 12, 2026	Texas	Sutton	Domestic	Domestic	Sheep
June 20, 2026	Texas	Crockett	Domestic	Domestic	Sheep
June 21, 2026	Texas	Edwards	Domestic	Domestic	Cattle
June 21, 2026	Texas	Edwards	Domestic	Domestic	Cattle
June 22, 2026	Texas	Terrell	Domestic	Domestic	Goats
June 23, 2026	Texas	Terrell	Domestic	Domestic	Cattle
June 23, 2026	Texas	Terrell	Domestic	Domestic	Cattle
June 23, 2026	Texas	Terrell	Domestic	Domestic	Cattle
June 24, 2026	Texas	Medina	Domestic	Domestic	Cattle
June 24, 2026	Texas	Edwards	Domestic	Domestic	Sheep
June 24, 2026	Texas	Crockett	Domestic	Domestic	Sheep
June 24, 2026	Texas	Crockett	Domestic	Domestic	Sheep
June 24, 2026	Texas	Crockett	Domestic	Domestic	Sheep
June 24, 2026	Texas	Crockett	Domestic	Domestic	Sheep
June 26, 2026	Texas	Jim Hogg	Domestic	Domestic	Cattle
June 27, 2026	Texas	Crockett	Domestic	Domestic	Cattle
June 29, 2026	Texas	Pecos	Domestic	Domestic	Dog
June 29, 2026	Texas	Uvalde	Domestic	Domestic	Sheep
June 30, 2026	Texas	Crockett	Domestic	Domestic	Sheep
July 3, 2026	Texas	Crockett	Domestic	Domestic	Sheep
July 7, 2026	Texas	Crockett	Domestic	Domestic	Cattle
July 9, 2026	Texas	Brewster	Domestic	Domestic	Cattle
July 10, 2026	Texas	Crockett	Domestic	Domestic	Goats
July 13, 2026	Texas	Sutton	Domestic	Domestic	Dog
July 13, 2026	Texas	Brewster	Domestic	Domestic	Cattle
July 14, 2026	Texas	Pecos	Domestic	Domestic	Sheep
July 14, 2026	Texas	Pecos	Domestic	Domestic	Sheep
July 17, 2026	Texas	Starr	Domestic	Domestic	Cattle
July 18, 2026	Texas	Scheleicher	Domestic	Domestic	Sheep
July 21, 2026	Texas	Sutton	Domestic	Domestic	Goats
July 29, 2026	Texas	Brewster	Domestic	Domestic	Cattle
July 30, 2026	Texas	Brewster	Domestic	Domestic	Cattle
July 31, 2026	Texas	Pecos	Domestic	Domestic	Sheep
August 5, 2026	Texas	Terrell	Domestic	Domestic	Sheep
August 16, 2026	Texas	Val Verde	Domestic	Domestic	Sheep
August 25, 2026	Texas	Val Verde	Domestic	Domestic	Goats
August 31, 2026	Texas	Crockett	Domestic	Domestic	Dog

== Domestic response ==
The USDA has released sterile screwworm flies in Texas, a technique that has eradicated screwworm from the United States previously. In June, Texas governor Greg Abbott pledged to assist the USDA to accelerate the construction of a sterile screwworm fly factory in Texas.

== International response ==
On June 5, 2026, Canada instituted a ban on imported cattle that were in Texas within the past 21 days.

In June 2026, Mexico halted most livestock imports from the United States.
