= Inherited sterility in insects =

Inherited sterility in insects is induced by substerilizing doses of ionizing radiation. When partially sterile males mate with wild females, the radiation-induced deleterious effects are inherited by the F1 generation. As a result, egg hatch is reduced and the resulting offspring are both highly sterile and predominately male. Compared with the high radiation required to achieve full sterility in Lepidoptera, the lower dose of radiation used to induce F1 sterility increases the quality and competitiveness of the released insects as measured by improved dispersal after release, increased mating ability, and superior sperm competition.

== History ==
Area-wide integrated pest management programmes using the sterile insect technique (SIT) as a component have been successful against a number of pest flies or Diptera such as the New World screwworm, Cochliomyia hominivorax, various species of tephritidae fruit flies and against tsetse flies (Glossinidae). However, most moths or lepidopterans are more resistant to radiation than dipterans, and as a consequence, the higher dose of radiation required to completely sterilize lepidopterans reduces their performance in the field. One approach to circumvent the negative effects associated with the high radio-resistance of Lepidoptera pests has been the use of inherited sterility or F1 sterility, first documented in studies on the codling moth (Cydia pomonella). Inherited sterility has also been documented in the Hemiptera order.

The silk worm Bombyx mori (Lepidoptera: Bombycidae) was the first insect in which inherited sterility was reported. Then inherited sterility was reported in the greater wax moth Galleria mellonella (Lepidoptera:Pyralidae), in the codling moth Cydia pomonella (Lepidoptera: Tortricidae), in the large milkweed bug Oncopeltus fasciatus (Hemiptera: Lygaeidae), in Gonocerus acuteangulatus (Hemiptera: Coreida), in Rhodnius prolixus (Hemiptera: Reduviidae), and in the Two-spotted spider mite Tetranychus urticae (Acari: Tetranychidae).

== Genetic basis ==
The mechanisms by which mutations cause lethality in Diptera in the developing zygote are well documented. The primary lesion leading to a dominant lethal mutation is a break in the chromosome, in this case, induced by radiation. When a break is induced in a chromosome in mature sperm, it remains in this condition until after the sperm has entered an egg. Following fusion, nuclear divisions begin, and a break in a chromosome can have drastic effects on the viability of the embryo as development proceeds. During early prophase the broken chromosome undergoes normal replication, but during metaphase the broken ends can fuse leading to the formation of a dicentric chromosome and an acentric fragment. The acentric fragment is frequently lost, while the dicentric fragment forms a bridge at anaphase leading to another chromosomal break. This whole process then repeats itself, leading to the accumulation of serious imbalances in the genetic information of the daughter cells. The accumulation of this genetic damage finally leads to the death of the zygote.

Diptera, Hymenoptera, and Coleoptera orders can be classed as radiation-sensitive, while Lepidoptera, Hemiptera and mites (Acari) orders are radiation-resistant. A major difference between these two groups of Insects is that the former group has a localized centromere (monokinetic), while the latter has a diffuse centromere (holokinetic). However, more recent work suggested that lepidopteran chromosomes are intermediate between holokinetic and monocentric chromosomes. In any case, the centromere difference is believed to play a major, although not exclusive, role in radiation sensitivity. It was suggested that possible molecular mechanisms responsible for the high radioresistance in Lepidoptera might include an inducible cell recovery system and a DNA repair probes.

Lepidoptera also do not show the classical breakage-fusion-bridge cycle that is a characteristic of dominant lethals induced in Diptera. It appears that lepidopteran chromosomes can tolerate telomere loss without the drastic effects that this has on chromosomes in other orders. Lepidopteran chromosomes possess a localized kinetochore plate to which the spindle microtubules attach during cell division. The kinetochore plates are large and cover a significant portion of the chromosome length, ensuring that more radiation-induced breaks will not lead to the loss of chromosome fragments as is typical in species with monocentric chromosomes. In species with large kinetochore plates, the fragments may persist for a number of mitotic cell divisions, and can even be transmitted through germ cells to the next generation. The plates also reduce the risk of lethality caused by the formation of dicentric chromosomes, acentric fragments, and other unstable aberrations.

== Field application ==
The F1 sterile progeny produced in the field enhance the efficacy of released partially sterile males, and improve compatibility with other pest control strategies. For example, the presence of F1 sterile progeny can be used to increase the build-up of natural enemies in the field. In addition, F1 sterile progeny can be used to study the potential host and geographical ranges of exotic lepidopteran pests.

Field programmes releasing irradiated moths under an SIT or inherited sterility approach have been in operation since the 1960s. The pink bollworm, Pectinophora gossypiella has been successfully contained since 1969 in cotton areas of the San Joaquin Valley in California and is being successfully targeted for eradication from cotton areas in the south-western USA and north-western Mexico. Since the early 1990s, the codling moth has been successfully suppressed in apple and pear production areas in the Okanagan Valley in British Columbia, Canada, and countries such as Argentina, Brazil and South Africa have plans or programmes against this pest. New Zealand eradicated outbreaks of the Australian painted apple moth, Teia anartoides. Mexico eradicated outbreaks of the cactus moth, Cactoblastis cactorum and the USA contains its advance along the Gulf of Mexico coast. South Africa has a programme to suppress the false codling moth, Thaumatotibia leucotreta in citrus orchards. Control of most moth pests is hampered by the increased resistance to the most widely used broad spectrum insecticides; hence the potential for expanded implementation of inherited sterility as part of an area-wide integrated approach is considerable.

== See also ==
- Genetically modified insect
- Infertility
- Sterile insect technique
- Sterility (physiology)
