= Flyttr =

UK-based biotechnology company

- Industry: Biotechnology
- Founded: Oxford, United Kingdom (2002)
- Key people: Luke Alphey (Founder), Grey Frandsen (CEO)
- Parent: Third Security
- Website: flyttr.com

Flyttr (previously Oxitec) is a multinational biotechnology company that develops genetically modified insects in order to improve public health and food security through insect control. The insects act as biological insecticides. The company claims that this technology is more effective and more environmentally friendly than chemical insecticides. The main principle behind Flyttr's mosquito control technology is release of genetically engineered male insects whose female offspring dies before reaching maturity.

Flyttr has developed tools to control the mosquito species Anopheles stephensi, Anopheles albimanus, and Aedes aegypti. Additionally they've developed tools against the pink bollworm, and the diamondback moth as well as other insects and arachnids.

== History ==
Oxitec was founded in 2002 as Oxford Insect Technologies in the United Kingdom by Luke Alphey and David Kelly, working with Oxford University's Isis Innovation technology transfer company. In August 2015, Oxitec was purchased by U.S.-based Intrexon for $160 million, and by US-based Third Security in early 2020.

The company's first engineered insect was the pink bollworm (Pectinophora gossypiella). It was experimentally released in Arizona in 2006. The company then modified Aedes aegypti, a mosquito which spreads dengue fever, yellow fever, and chikungunya, followed by a series of field trials in multiple countries.

Grey Frandsen was appointed CEO in 2017. He is an American who led start-up initiatives in the U.S. government and the private and non-profit sectors on matters relating to national and global public health security, biotechnology and crisis response. Frandsen led the company's transition to its 2nd generation technology in 2018. During the 2010s, Oxitec established partnerships with agricultural industry leaders and the Bill & Melinda Gates Foundation. Frandsen was named one of Malaria No More's 10-to-End innovators in 2019.

== Genetically modified insects ==
Oxitec has developed genetically modified versions of A. aegypti mosquito and of P. gossypiella pink bollworm to be released in the wild with the goal of reducing existing insect populations.

Oxitec has created multiple generations of Aedes aegypti strains for controling mosquito populations. Its first strain, OX513A, is homozygous for a lethal transgene that can be repressed with tetracycline while the mosquitos are reared in captivity. In a typical field application, released males mate with wild females. The resulting offspring do not survive to adulthood, reducing the population of the next generation. Oxitec's second generation Aedes aegypti strain, OX5034, carry the same lethal transgene, but takes advantage of a sex-specific splicing mechanism that causes the gene to only be expressed in female mosquitoes. Male offspring survive and can pass the gene to a further generation.

The lethal transgene, tTAV, is a variant of the tetracycline transactivator (tTA) gene optimized for expression in fruit flies and other insects. The original tTA gene was developed for research purposes as a fusion of an E.coli and a Herpes simplex virus genes. A high concentration of the tTAV protein is lethal, likely due to interference with transcriptional regulation. Large numbers of transgenic mosquitoes can be efficiently reared by temporarily suppressing the activity of the tTAV protein in females using tetracycline family antibiotics. Variants of tTA are widely used in human cell lines and various model organisms, including fungi, mice and plants, with no known adverse effects.

OX513A mosquitoes also carry a fluorescent gene marker for easy screening of released mosquitoes.

== Projects ==
=== Grand Cayman ===
The first field trials were performed on Grand Cayman, starting in 2009. Approximately 3.3 million transgenic male A. aegypti were released. The experiments demonstrated that the animals were able to survive in this environment and produce offspring. Some eleven weeks after the release, the observed A. aegypti population declined about 80%. The tests were deemed a scientific success, but criticism emerged over communication policy. In May 2016 Grand Cayman announced a program to use Oxitec mosquitoes. The first phase informed the community about the program. The next phase treated an area with about 1,800 residents in West Bay. 88% fewer A. aegypti eggs were observed compared to an equivalent untreated area.

In November 2018, the Cayman Islands government elected to cease any new field trial agreements with Oxitec, citing cost-benefit concerns with the technologies as the primary concern. Health Minister Dwayne Seymour and other legislators expressed skepticism on-the-record about the trials' effectiveness. However, Oxitec and the Mosquito Research and Control Unit of the Cayman Islands continue to analyze the data collected over the 10-year project.

=== Brazil ===
In 2011 Oxitec conducted a field test in cooperation with the company Moscamed and the University of São Paulo. The observed population declined by 80–95%.

In July 2015, Oxitec released results of a test in the Juazeiro region of Brazil to fight Dengue, Chikungunya and Zika viruses. They concluded that mosquito populations were reduced by about 95%. It was used to try to combat Zika in Piracicaba, São Paulo in 2016.

In a 2013 OX513A project in Jacobina in the state of Bahia Some 450,000 males were released every week for 27 months. Wild populations were studied before the program began and at intervals of 6, 12 and 27 to 30 months.

Another OX513A field test began on 23 May 2018 in Indaiatuba, a municipality in the state of São Paulo. The company announced the trial's results in June 2019, reporting that the project reduced the mosquito population by 79%.

A 2019 outside study reported that genes characteristic of the altered males had entered the wild population. Oxitec put out a statement, citing concern with the paper's "misleading and speculative statements". The company's statement included rebuttals to the article's claims. All of these were confirmed by Scientific Reports and Nature Magazine in March 2020 in an Editorial Expression of Concern.

It was reported that some of the authors claimed that they had not approved the version that was submitted for publication. Several critics responded to the paper, including entomologist Jason Rasgon of Pennsylvania State University, who stated that the finding was important, but that some claims were overstated and irresponsible.

A 2018-2019 Indaiatuba study of four densely populated neighborhoods with high levels of Aedes aegypti reported that mosquito populations declined an average 88 percent over 11 months in those neighborhoods. In two, scientists released 100 male mosquito eggs per resident per week and 500 in the others, reporting that the smaller numbers were as effective as the higher ones. Boxes filled with eggs are available for home and business use.

=== Malaysia ===
Field trials were carried out in Malaysia in 2015.

=== Panama ===
Field trials were conducted in Panama in 2016.

=== United States ===
==== Arizona ====
The company released an engineered pink bollworm (Pectinophora gossypiella) in Arizona in 2006.

==== Florida ====
A 2016 field trial planned in Florida was canceled.

Oxitec was invited to the Florida Keys in the early 2010s. The company conducted extensive community engagement. A November 2016 referendum showed overwhelming local support for the project to release genetically engineered male mosquitoes. 31 out of 33 Monroe County precincts voted in favor. The company established waitlists due to resident interest in hosting mosquito boxes.

Some residents opposed the project, worrying about bites by the mosquitoes (male mosquitoes do not have the mouthparts to bite). Others were unhappy about becoming a test site, with some threatening to derail the experiments by filling the mosquito boxes with bleach.

In 2020, Oxitec's OX5034 mosquito was approved for release by state and federal authorities for use in Florida. In April 2021, boxes containing mosquito eggs were placed at six locations. Once they hatched, about 12,000 males were expected weekly over the following 12 weeks, totaling 144k. In the second phase, nearly 20 million mosquitoes were expected over 16 weeks. In 2022, 5 million mosquitoes were released. All female offspring that inherited the lethal gene were reported to have died before reaching adulthood. The company also reported that spread of the related mutations was limited to a small area.

==== California ====
In 2022, EPA officials approved the release of 2.4 billion males of A. aegypti in California's Central Valley through 2024. The project is a partnership with the Delta Mosquito and Vector Control district in Tulare county. It awaits approval by California pesticide regulators. Specimens cannot be released near any potential tetracycline sources (which allows females to develop), or within 500 meters of wastewater treatment facilities, commercial citrus, apple, pear, nectarine, peach growing areas, or livestock. Opponents include Friends of the Earth, the Institute for Responsible Tech and the Center for Food Safety who object to the lack of public data on the Florida trial and the technique's experimental status. Specimens have been identified in 21 of California's 58 counties.

In 2022 Oxitec was seeking approval for a pilot release.

== Regulation ==
OX513A was approved by Brazil's National Biosecurity Technical Commission (CTNBio) in April 2014. In January 2016 Brazil's National Biosafety Committee approved the release Oxitec mosquitoes throughout their country.

Brazil's health-regulatory agency, Anvisa, declared on 12 April 2016 that it would regulate Oxitec's mosquitoes. Anvisa announced that it was creating a legal framework for regulations. It requested Oxitec to demonstrate that its technology was safe and could reduce the transmission of mosquito-borne viruses.

In 2020 Brazilian Biosafety Regulatory Authority CTNBio granted full commercial biosafety approval for Oxitec's mosquitoes.

Oxitec's Florida Keys project was approved by federal and state regulators, including the U.S. Environmental Protection Agency (EPA) and the Florida Department of Agriculture and Consumer Services (FDACS). In August 2020, the Florida Keys Mosquito Control District (FKMCD) Board of Commissioners approved the project.

The Netherlands agreed to release Oxitec's genetically modified mosquitoes to fight dengue fever, chikungunya and zika in Saba, a Dutch Caribbean island, after a report by The National Institute of Public Health and the Environment (RIVM) examined the effects that these mosquitoes could have in the local ecosystem and concluded the release of the mosquitoes would not pose risks to human health or the environment.

The French High Council for Biotechnology supported Oxitec mosquito releases in 2017.

== Criticism ==
A 2019 study claimed that Oxitec's first generation A. aegypti (the redundant OX513A) had successfully hybridized with the local A. aegypti population. It was challenged by Oxitec and most of the study's co-authors. The study was found to be purely speculative and is now marked by its publisher with an Editorial Expression of Concern.

== See also ==
- Genetically modified organism
- Sterile insect technique
