= Bushland (disambiguation) =

Bushland is a term for naturally vegetated areas of Australia

Bushland may also refer to:

- Bushland, Texas, a city in Texas.
- Raymond Bushland, an entomologist

== See also ==
- Bush
- The Bush
