= JCM Farming =

American company

JCM Farming, Inc. is an agricultural company based in Carlsbad, California. It was incorporated by the heirs of a date farming operation in the Imperial Valley in the early 1900s. The firm also owns and operate the Oasis Ranch near Indio, California in the Coachella Valley. The firm has been involved in a number of lawsuits demanding crop dusters, aircraft and hot air balloons quit flying over their property. JCM Farming, Inc., and its affiliates own dozens of properties throughout Riverside County and an almond farm in Stanislaus County. JCM Farming has acquired properties as early as the 1970s.

JCM Farming does not publicly disclose information as to its activities, although the company states itself as operating in the agricultural sector.

== History and layout ==
Press reports indicate the Oasis Ranch facility was built in 1999 on 24 acres and is surrounded by 24-foot-high (7.3 m), 4 feet (1.2 m) thick walls. Other defenses include a partial moat, guard dogs, armed guards and video cameras. The compound includes two large buildings and a Moorish-style bell tower. The company describes the ranch as "an eighty-acre olive farm." Other documents indicate the farm is in fact a "private event and meeting center" — "a respite for and marketed to state departments, foreign dignitaries, diplomats, Fortune 500 executives and their boards, ultra high net worth individuals and their families and celebrities."

== Legal issues ==
JCM Farming sparked media attention as early as 2011 over lawsuits with the U.S. government and aviation companies due to the nature of the lawsuits, which also involved requests to issue gag orders.

Starting in 2009, the firm began a series of lawsuits against the operators of hot air balloons in the valley claiming harassment, invasion of privacy, and safety hazards. The suits were against fifteen balloonists, as well as the operator of an aircraft dropping sterile insects for the US Department of Agriculture. JCM Farming demanded an end to flights over the farm's airspace, and restrictions on flights in the wider vicinity of the farm. An attorney for one of the balloonists characterized JCM as attempting to "drive these defendants into financial attrition".

By 2011, thirteen of fifteen balloonists named in the suit went out of business, were faced with default judgments, or agreed to JCM's terms.
