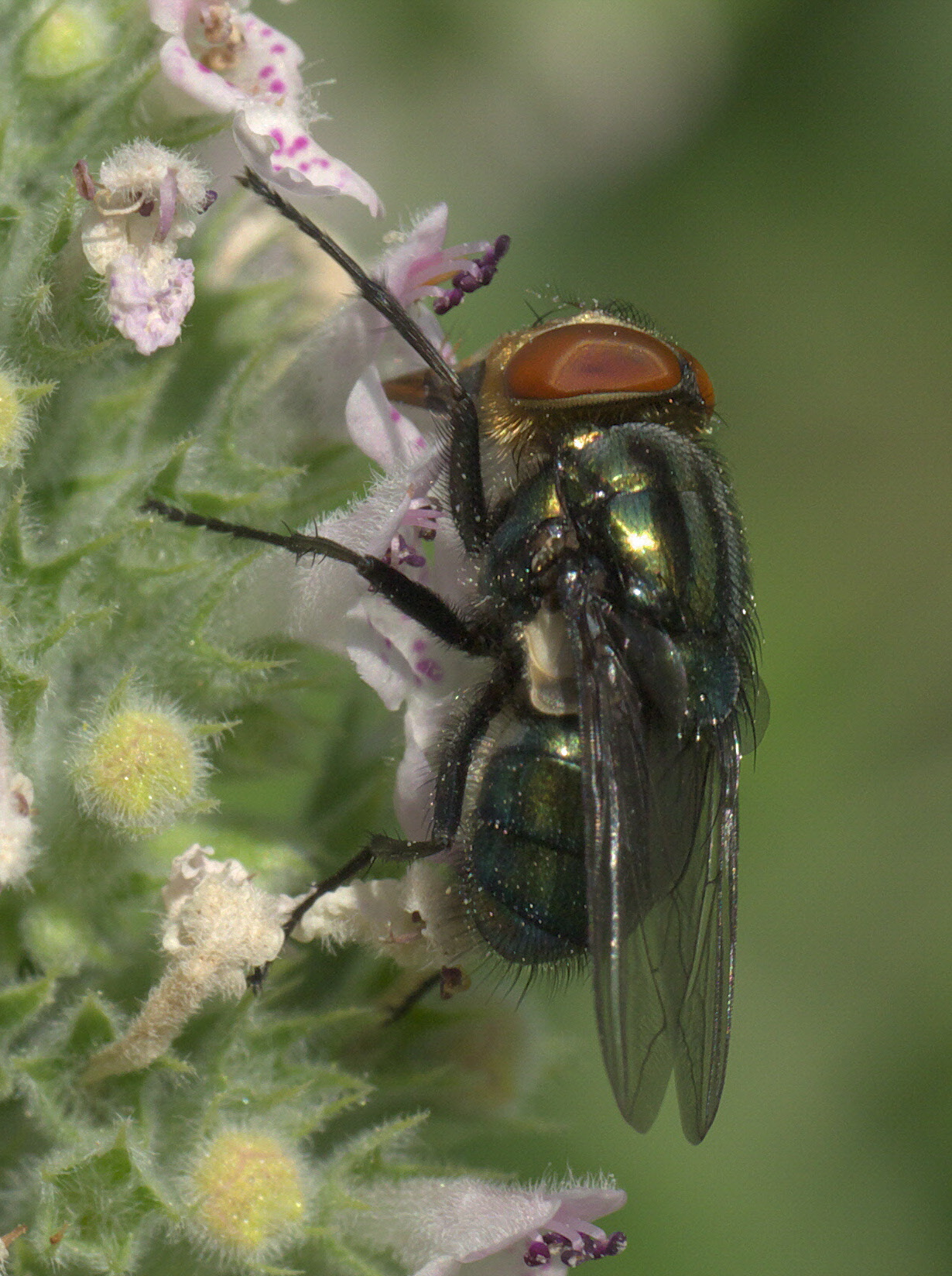

Scientific classification
- Kingdom: Animalia
- Phylum: Arthropoda
- Class: Insecta
- Order: Diptera
- Family: Calliphoridae
- Genus: Cochliomyia
- Species: C. macellaria

Binomial name
- Cochliomyia macellaria (Fabricius, 1775)

Synonyms
- Chrysomya coerulescens Robineau-Desvoidy, 1830; Chrysomya lherminieri Robineau-Desvoidy, 1830; Lucilia vittata Macquart, 1843; Musca certima Walker, 1849; Musca macellaria Fabricius, 1775

= Cochliomyia macellaria =

Species of fly

Figure 1. Image of Cochliomyia macellaria (Fabricius, 1775) collected 9 Sept 2024 by S. Mears in Baldwin County GA. Scale bar 1 cm

Cochliomyia macellaria, also known as the secondary screwworm, is a species of blow fly in the family Calliphoridae. These screwworms are referred to as "secondary" because they typically infest wounds after invasion by primary myiasis-causing flies. While blow flies may be found in every terrestrial habitat, C. macellaria is primarily found in the United States, American tropics, and sometimes southern Canada. They are most common in the southeastern United States in states like Florida. C. macellaria have a metallic greenish-blue thorax and a red-orange head and eyes. These adult blowflies range from 5–8 mm in size.

Since the fly larvae infect the wounds and dead tissue of animals, these flies pose a grave medical and economic risk to humans and livestock. C. macellaria are attracted to carrion and garbage and are often found in slaughterhouses and outdoor markets in the tropics. While these flies carry many various types of Salmonella and viruses like the swine influenza, C. macellaria can also serve as important decomposers in our ecosystem.

== Description ==
Cochliomyia macellaria are classified as intermediate sized flies with a dull or bright metallic, blue-green coloration. On their thorax, there are three black longitudinal stripes that interrupt the blue-green color. The eye and head of these flies are orange-red in color. C. macellaria also has pale setae on the fronto-orbital plate outside of the frontal bristles. On C. macellaria the frontal row of bristles extend anteriorly to the base of the first antennal segment and consist of 12–14 bristles. The legs of the fly are orange brown to dark brown, and the coxae are orange brown to black with a green metallic luster. C. macellaria possess a dark reddish brown anterior femur and an orange-red anterior tibia. The anterior tibia also has four short bristles that are placed on the dorsal side. The color of the wings of the fly is orange brown tint towards the base. On these wings, the veins in the fly are orange brown to dark brown. The costal sessions 2 to 6 are in the proportions 78:56:96:30:6:6. The first genital section is black with a metallic green luster. On the fly, the scattered setae and a defined marginal row of bristles; the second segment is smaller with a dark brown to black tint with scattered setae.

=== Distinguishing features ===
Cochliomyia macellaria is closely related to C. hominivorax but can be distinguished from C. hominivorax in three primarily ways: two of which are seen in adults and one which is seen in the larvae. In adults, the hairs on the fronto-orbital plate are black in C. hominivorax, but are pale in C. macellaria. Additionally, the central black stripe on the thorax extends only slightly in front of the mesonotal suture in C. hominivorax and well in front of the suture in C. macellaria. C. macellaria larvae, unlike like C. hominivorax larvae, do not have pigmented tracheal trunks but instead have V-shaped spines on the anal protuberance. C. macellaria also does not have an oral sclerite.

== Distribution and territory ==
Cochliomyia macellaria is most often found in the southeastern part of the United States, in states like Florida, Louisiana, and Georgia. Despite the high concentration in these states, these flies have been found as far north as Southern Canada and as south as the Neotropics, with the exclusion of countries like Chile and Argentina. While they have been found in this large expanse of areas, they have been shown to thrive most in warm and humid areas like the Southern United States, Caribbean Islands, Central America, and northern South America. In these areas, the population size typically increases during periods of extended rainfall.

The territories of these blowflies are relatively small, especially during the time of mating. In this period, these flies will stay within a couple meters of one another.

== Life cycle and history ==
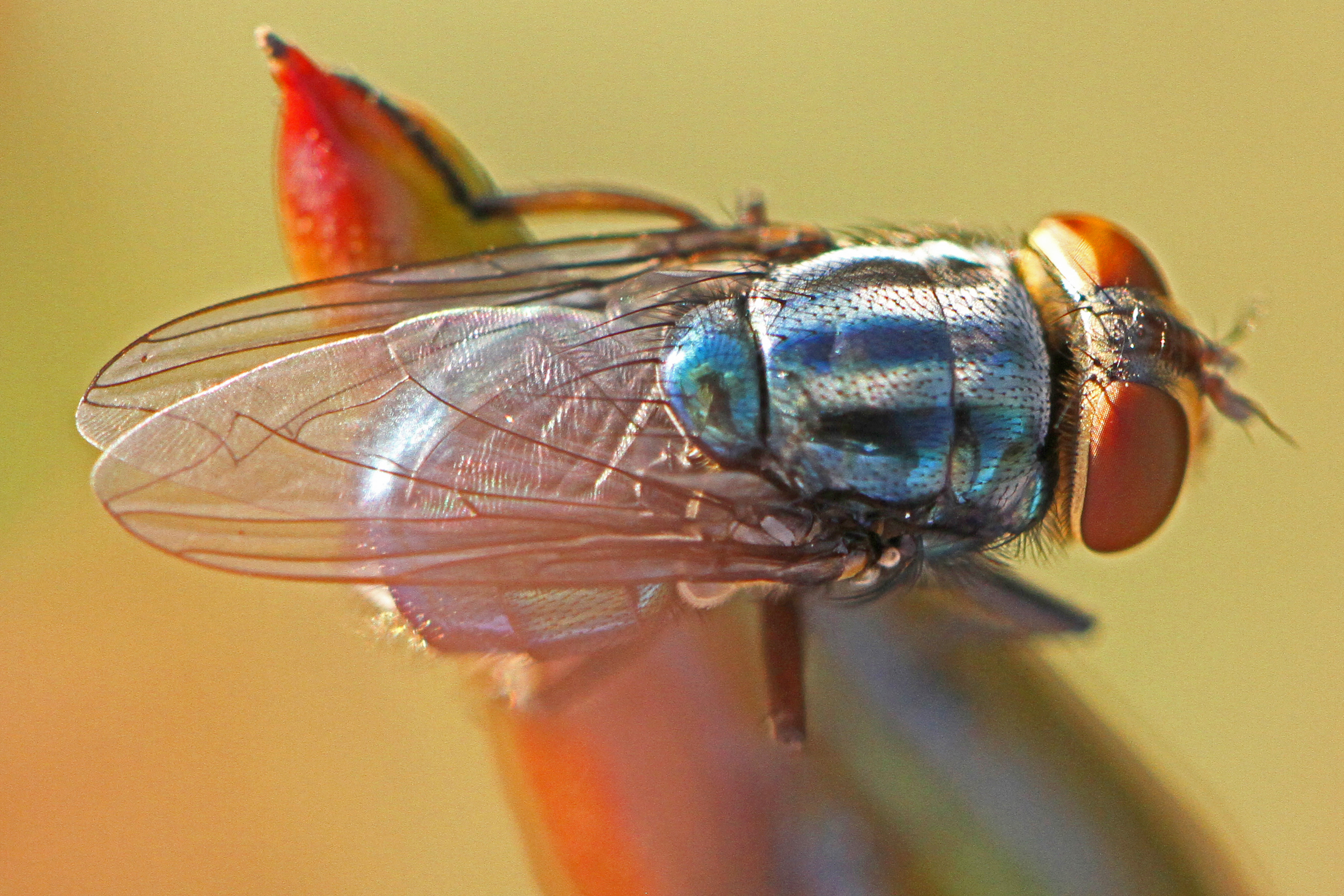
Secondary screwworm.

The average life span of an adult C. macellaria is 2–6 weeks. In this time period, the females try to increase the chances of producing as many surviving offspring as possible. In a lifetime, C. macellaria may lay up to 1000 or more eggs. These eggs are typically laid in groups of 40 to 250. Females may also lay their eggs with other females, leading to an accumulation of thousands of eggs.

=== Eggs ===
The eggs of C. macellaria are laid in large groups (40–250 eggs at one time) and typically hatch in about 24 hours. The time taken for eggs to hatch often depends on moisture, temperature, and precipitation. In favorable conditions, the eggs may hatch in just four hours. These eggs are about 1 mm long and appear white to pearl white in color.

=== Larvae ===
The larval stage of C. macellaria is referred to by the common name of secondary screwworms; this is due to the presence of small spines on each body segment that resemble parts of a screw. The larval stage of C. macellaria immediately follows the egg stage and is typically broken down into three substages or instars. Upon hatching, the larve appear a cream color, have cylindrical bodies with 10 or more spines around the spiracular area, possess incomplete peritremes (an indistinct or absent button), and have bands of small spines on each segment. C. macellaria, unlike like C. hominivorax, do not have pigmented tracheal trunks; instead, they have V-shaped spines on the anal protuberance. C. macellaria also does not have an oral sclerite.

Cochliomyia macellaria larvae will feed on the decaying flesh of the animal that they have been laid on until they reach maturity. This stage of maturity is during the third instar and by this time point, the larvae may be as long as 17 mm. The entire larval stage is about four to seven days long, and afterwards, the larvae fall off the food source to pupate in the top layer of the soil.

=== Pupae ===
The C. macellaria larvae will typically burrow underneath the top layer of soil, leaves, garbage and begin to pupate there. During this stage, the outer layer begins to turn brown from the cream white that it used to be. The outer skin will begin to shrink and harden while the pupa develops entirely in the hardened shell. Based on the temperature, the length of this stage will vary greatly. In warmer temperatures, the stage may last as short as seven days, but in colder temperatures, it may last as long as two months.

=== Adults ===
Adult C. macellaria are considered to be medium-sized flies; they are about 6 to 9 mm in size and appear bright metallic blue-green to blueish purple in color. These adults typically spend one to two days maturing after leaving the pupae stage. Within four days of emerging from the pupa stage, the adult C. macellaria become sexually mature and start looking for mates. The males will typically mate rapidly and will spend most of their time eating nearby vegetation and nectar from flowers. The females, on the other hand, will feed on the fluids of live wounds from animals. Contrary to the males, the females will travel long distances to find mates.

== Food resources ==
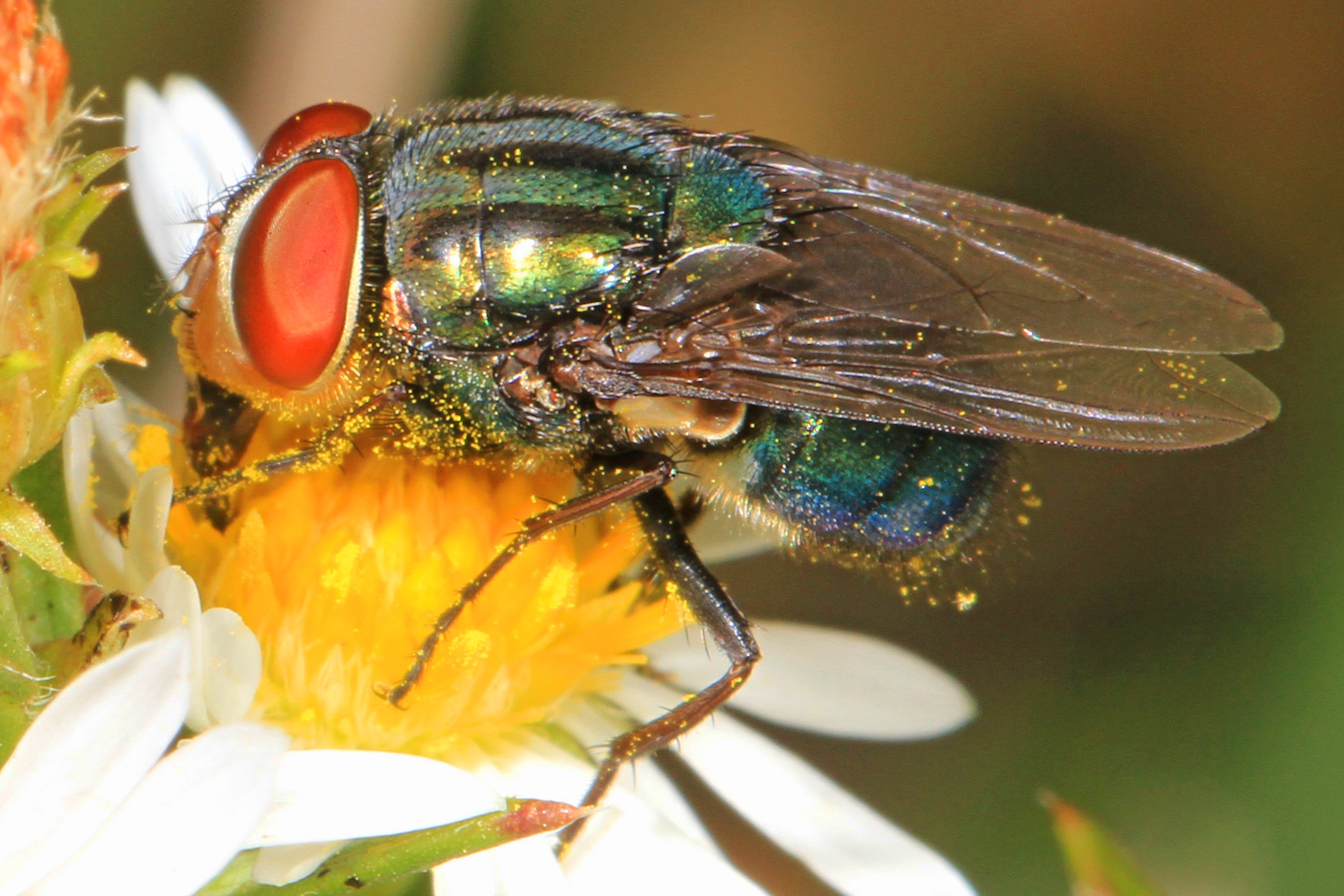
C. macellaria male adult on a flower.

Depending on the gender and stage in their development, C. macellaria will utilize different resources for energy and nutrients. During the larval stage, the C. macellaria will dig deeper into the necrotic wounds of their host animal and feed on the dead tissue. Both males and females will feast through this method. This time period is extremely crucial to the flies, as they must gather enough nutrients in order to last through the pupal stage without any food sources. This is one reason why the larvae are much larger than the size of the adult C. macellaria.

As adults, the food specifications of the flies change. Female flies will continue to feed on tissues of animals; however, now they preferentially feed off of live tissue and tissue plasma. Males, at this point, will no longer consume tissue, but instead will eat nearby vegetation and intake nutrients from the nectar of flowers.

== Mating ==
Although there are few studies on the mating patterns of C. macellaria, there is some information on the interactions between the males and females. Adult female C. macellaria have been observed to will release pheromones that will stimulate the males copulatory attempts on contact. Even though depriving the C. macellaria adults of dietary proteins did not impact the potency of the female extracts, there was a reduced response in males for the pheromones.

== Parental care ==
Male C. macellaria do not provide parental care. The males will typically mate quickly and have the females bear the young. Since the females lay so many eggs, there is little care provided by the actual mothers after laying the eggs. The females do strategically lay the eggs in dead skin flesh so that once the eggs hatch into larvae, nutrition will be readily available.

== Social behavior ==
Traditional social behavior like lekking has not been observed in C. macellaria; however, other social behaviors have been observed.

=== Egg laying ===
It is common for female C. macellaria to lay eggs with other females. Since females may lay up to 250 eggs, it is common for aggregations of thousands of eggs to infest entire animal carcasses.

=== Pheromone selectivity ===
While C. hominivorax is closely related to C. macellaria, traits developed during their evolution have led to reproductive isolation. One of these mechanisms is the interspecies response to the C. macellaria female pheromone. Studies on newly colonized C. hominivorax males have demonstrated that the males do not respond to the C. macellaria pheromone.

== Enemies ==
=== Larval predation ===
When studying the larval dispersal and predation for C. macellaria, studies have shown that there is interspecies competition and predation. It has been demonstrated that C. albiceps larvae attack C. macellaria larvae during their dispersal process. Additionally, C. macellaria showed higher aggregation level in single than in double species. This may be explained by an evolutionary mechanism used to conserve and protect C. macellaria from predation.

=== Human depredation ===
Due to the medical and economic impact of the C. macellaria and other blowflies, an array of pesticides have been developed to reduce the C. macellaria population, including pyrethrin aerosol.

== Mimicry and protective coloration ==
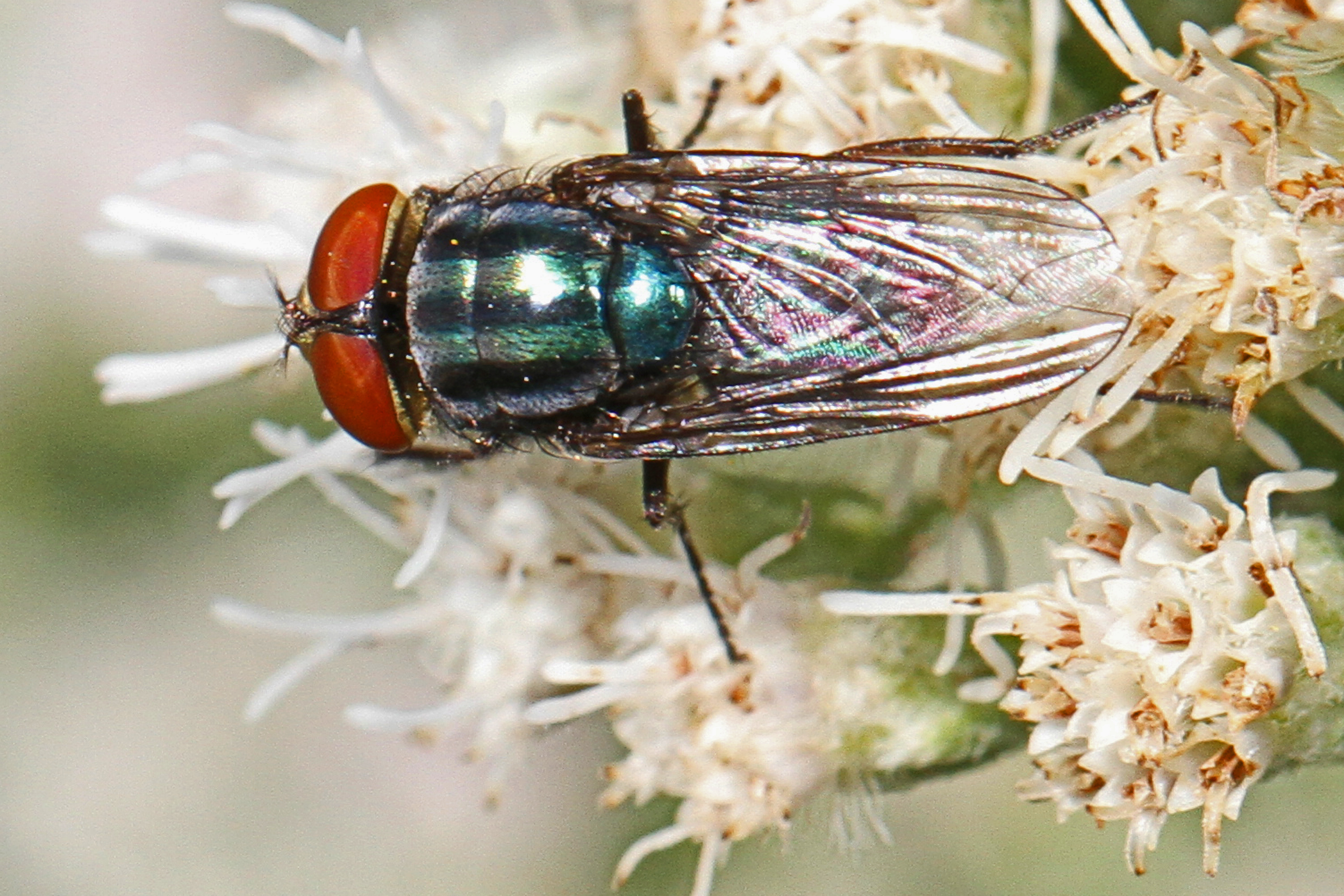
C. macellaria sitting on a flower.

While there are theories for protective coloration, there is no clear mimicry done by C. macellaria or by other insects specifically mimicking C. macellaria. The metallic green coloration may be a form of warding off predators, but this still in the process of being analyzed.

== Impact ==
=== Medical ===
Cochliomyia macellaria has extensive medical and economic implications. When C. macellaria larvae infest the dead and decaying tissues of animals or humans, myiasis may often occur. Once infestation occurs, a dark brown discharge will start to leaking from the wound. As the infestation increases, there is more agitation and inflamed tissue, which is accompanied by unpleasant smells. After the process of clinical diagnosis begins and the myiasis is recognized, then the larvae are easier to identify. Treatment of these infestations can be time intensive and leads to increased chances of reoccurrences. The first step is manual removal of the larvae followed by an antibiotic smear.

=== Economic ===
The livestock industry considers the secondary screwworm an important pest because of the enormous economic losses caused by cases of myiasis and disease transmission. The medical and pesticide treatment costs the United States millions of dollars annually.

== Forensic importance ==
Cochliomyia macellaria is the most common species of blow flies found on carrion in the southern United States. C. macellaria has recently gained recognition in forensic entomology because of its occurrence on decomposing remains. Since the analysis of the succession and occurrence has been well defined, it is possible to create postmortem interval estimations, which are crucial for forensic entomology. Adult C. macellaria in the southeastern United States are only attracted to the dead tissue on animals minutes after the death. In other regions of the United States, the adult flies are attracted to the dead flesh after a 24-hour delay.
