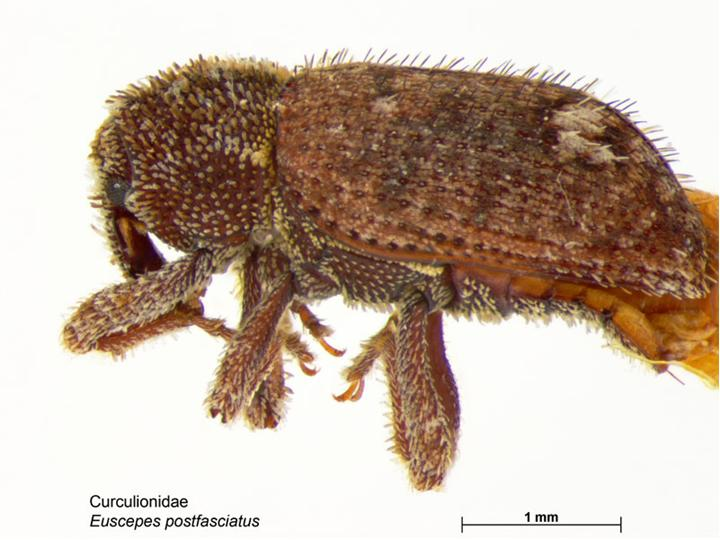
- Euscepes postfasciatus

Scientific classification
- Domain: Eukaryota
- Kingdom: Animalia
- Phylum: Arthropoda
- Class: Insecta
- Order: Coleoptera
- Suborder: Polyphaga
- Infraorder: Cucujiformia
- Family: Curculionidae
- Genus: Euscepes; Schönherr, 1844

= Euscepes =

Genus of beetles

Euscepes is a genus of hidden snout weevils in the family Curculionidae. There are at least 20 described species in Euscepes.

== Species ==
These 24 species belong to the genus Euscepes:

- Euscepes batatae Champion, 1905^{c}
- Euscepes bicolor Faust, 1896^{c}
- Euscepes carinirostris Hustache, 1930^{c}
- Euscepes convexipennis Hustache, 1930^{c}
- Euscepes crassirostris Chevrolat, 1879^{c}
- Euscepes deceptus Blatchley, 1925^{i c}
- Euscepes divisus Champion, 1905^{c}
- Euscepes erinaceus Chevrolat, 1880^{c}
- Euscepes fasciatus Faust, 1896^{c}
- Euscepes frontalis Chevrolat, 1879^{c}
- Euscepes fur Chevrolat, 1880^{c}
- Euscepes hirsutus Chevrolat, 1880^{c}
- Euscepes longisetis Champion, 1905^{c}
- Euscepes longulus Champion, 1905^{c}
- Euscepes obscurus Hustache, 1930^{c}
- Euscepes ornatipennis Chevrolat, 1879^{c}
- Euscepes parvulus Hustache, 1930^{c}
- Euscepes pilosellus Chevrolat, 1879^{c}
- Euscepes porcatus Chevrolat, 1879^{c}
- Euscepes porcellus Boheman, 1844^{i c b}
- Euscepes postfasciatus (Fairmaire, 1849)^{i c b} (west Indian sweetpotato weevil)
- Euscepes tonsa Chevrolat, L.A.A., 1880^{c}
- Euscepes truncatipennis Champion, 1905^{c}
- Euscepes ursus Chevrolat, 1880^{c}

Data sources: i = ITIS, c = Catalogue of Life, g = GBIF, b = Bugguide.net
