= Genetically modified insect =

Insect that has been genetically modified

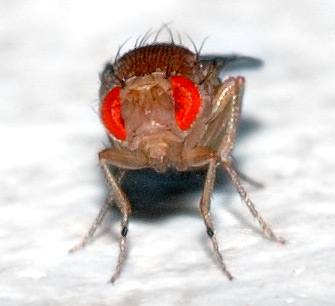
The fruit-fly Drosophila melanogaster, often used in genetic modification studies

A genetically modified (GM) insect is an insect that has been genetically modified, either through mutagenesis, or more precise processes of transgenesis, or cisgenesis. Motivations for using GM insects include biological research purposes and genetic pest management. Genetic pest management capitalizes on recent advances in biotechnology and the growing repertoire of sequenced genomes in order to control pest populations, including insects. Insect genomes can be found in genetic databases such as NCBI, and databases more specific to insects such as FlyBase, VectorBase, and BeetleBase. There is an ongoing initiative started in 2011 to sequence the genomes of 5,000 insects and other arthropods called the i5k. Some Lepidoptera (e.g. monarch butterflies and silkworms) have been genetically modified in nature by the wasp bracovirus.

== Types of genetic pest management ==
The sterile insect technique (SIT) was developed conceptually in the 1930s and 1940s and first used in the environment in the 1950s. SIT is a control strategy where male insects are sterilized, usually by irradiation, then released to mate with wild females. If enough males are released, the females will mate with mostly sterile males and lay non-viable eggs. This causes the population of insects to crash (the abundance of insects is extremely diminished), and in some cases can lead to local eradication. Irradiation is a form of mutagenesis which causes random mutations in DNA.

=== Release of Insects carrying Dominant Lethals (RIDL) ===
Release of Insects carrying Dominant Lethals or RIDL is a control strategy using genetically engineered insects that have (carry) a lethal gene in their genome (an organism's DNA). Lethal genes cause death in an organism, and RIDL genes only kill young insects, usually larvae or pupae. Similar to how inheritance of brown eyes is dominant to blue eyes, this lethal gene is dominant so that all offspring of the RIDL insect will also inherit the lethal gene. This lethal gene has a molecular on and off switch, allowing these RIDL insects to be reared. The lethal gene is turned off when the RIDL insects are mass reared in an insectary, and turned on when they are released into the environment. RIDL males and females are released to mate with wild males and their offspring die when they reach the larval or pupal stage because of the lethal gene. This causes the population of insects to crash. This technique is being developed for some insects and for other insects has been tested in the field. It has been used in the Grand Cayman Islands, Panama, and Brazil to control the mosquito vector of dengue, Ae. aegypti. It is being developed for use in diamondback moth (Plutella xylostella), medfly (Ceratitis capitata) and olive fly (Bactrocera oleae).

=== Incompatible Insect Technique (IIT) ===
Wolbachia

=== Concerns ===
There are concerns about using tetracycline on a routine basis for controlling the expression of lethal genes. There are plausible routes for resistance genes to develop in the bacteria within the guts of GM-insects fed on tetracycline and from there, to circulate widely in the environment. For example, antibiotic-resistant genes could be spread to E. coli bacteria and into fruit by GM-Mediterranean fruit flies (Ceratitis capitata).

== Releases ==
Oxitec released its genetically modified in various countries, including Brazil, Grand Cayman, Malaysia, Panama, and the US.

== Modified species ==
=== Biological research ===
- Fruit flies (Drosophila melanogaster) are model organisms used in an array of biological disciplines (i.e. neurobiology, population genetics, ecology, animal behavior, systematics, genomics, and development). Many studies done with Drosophila species have been foundational in their respective fields, and they remain important models for other organisms, including humans. For example, they have contributed to understanding economically important insects and researching human disease and development. Fruit flies are often preferred over other animals due to their short life cycle, reproduction rate, low maintenance requirements, and amenability to mutagenesis. They are also the model genetic organism for historical reasons, being one of the first model organism and have a high quality completed genome.

=== Genetic pest management ===
- Yellow fever mosquito (Aedes aegypti)
- Malaria mosquito (Anopheles gambiae and Anopheles stephensi)
- Pink bollworm (Pectinophora gossypiella)

=== Diamondback moth ===
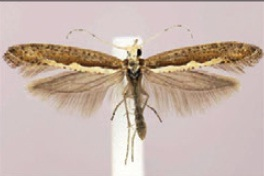
Diamondback moth

The diamondback moth's caterpillars gorge on cruciferous vegetables such as cabbage, broccoli, cauliflower and kale, globally costing farmers an estimated $5 billion (£3.2 billion) a year worldwide. In 2015, Oxitec developed GM-diamondback moths which produce non-viable female larvae to control populations able to develop resistance to insecticides. The GM-insects were initially placed in cages for field trials. Earlier, the moth was the first crop pest to evolve resistance to DDT and eventually became resistant to 45 other insecticides. In Malaysia, the moth has become immune to all synthetic sprays. The gene is a combination of DNA from a virus and a bacterium. In an earlier study, captive males carrying the gene eradicated communities of non-GM moths. Brood sizes were similar, but female offspring died before reproducing. The gene itself disappears after a few generations, requiring ongoing introductions of GM cultivated males. Modified moths can be identified by their red glow under ultraviolet light, caused by a coral transgene.

Opponents claim that the protein made by the synthetic gene could harm non-target organisms that eat the moths. The creators claim to have tested the gene's protein on mosquitoes, fish, beetles, spiders and parasitoids without observing problems. Farmers near the test site claim that moths could endanger nearby farms' organic certification. Legal experts say that national organic standards penalize only deliberate GMO use. The creators claim that the moth does not migrate if sufficient food is available, nor can it survive winter weather.

=== Mediterranean fruit fly ===
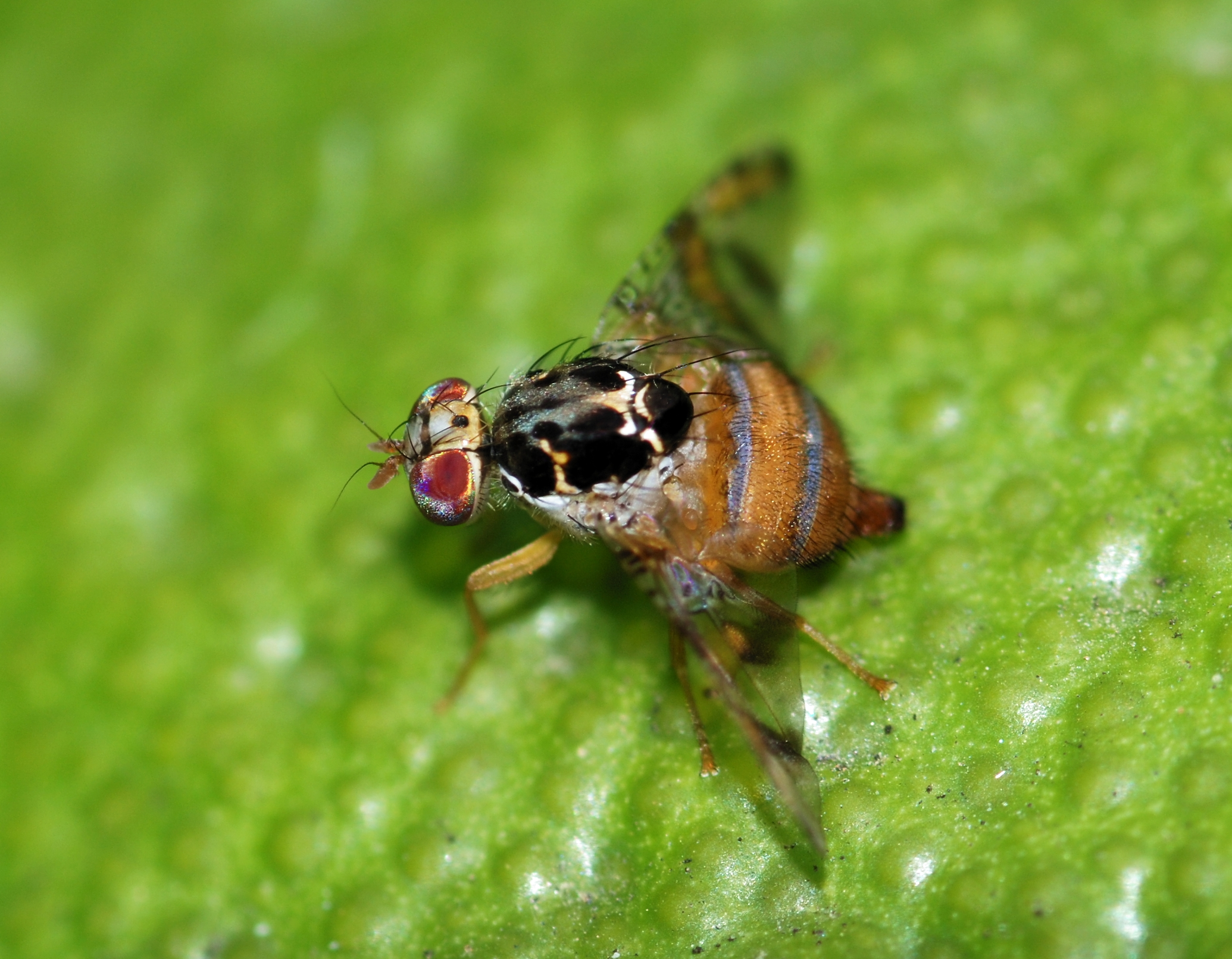
Mediterranean fruit fly

The Mediterranean fruit fly is a global agricultural pest. They infest a wide range of crops (over 300) including wild fruit, vegetables and nuts, and in the process, cause substantial damage. The company Oxitec has developed GM-males which have a lethal gene that interrupts female development and kills them in a process called "pre-pupal female lethality". After several generations, the fly population diminishes as the males can no longer find mates. To breed the flies in the laboratory, the lethal gene can be "silenced" using the antibiotic tetracycline.

Opponents argue that the long-term effects of releasing millions of GM-flies are impossible to predict. Dead fly larvae could be left inside crops. Helen Wallace from Genewatch, an organisation that monitors the use of genetic technology, stated "Fruit grown using Oxitec's GM flies will be contaminated with GM maggots which are genetically programmed to die inside the fruit they are supposed to be protecting". She added that the mechanism of lethality was likely to fail in the longer term as the GM flies evolve resistance or breed in sites contaminated with tetracycline which is widely used in agriculture.

== Legislation ==
In July 2015, the House of Lords (U.K.) Science and Technology Committee launched an inquiry into the possible uses of GM-insects and their associated technologies. The scope of the inquiry is to include questions such as "Would farmers benefit if insects were modified in order to reduce crop pests? What are the safety and ethical concerns over the release of genetically modified insects? How should this emerging technology be regulated?"

== See also ==
- Inherited sterility in insects
- List of sterile insect technique trials
- Insect ecology
- Detection of genetically modified organisms
