= Euscepes porcellus =

Scientific classification
- Kingdom: Animalia
- Phylum: Arthropoda
- Class: Insecta
- Order: Coleoptera
- Suborder: Polyphaga
- Infraorder: Cucujiformia
- Family: Curculionidae
- Genus: Euscepes
- Species: E. porcellus

Binomial name
- Euscepes porcellus Boheman, 1844

Synonyms
- Acalles longulus LeConte, 1876

Species of beetle

Euscepes porcellus is a species of hidden snout weevil in the beetle family Curculionidae. It is found in North America.
