= Raymond Bushland =

American entomologist

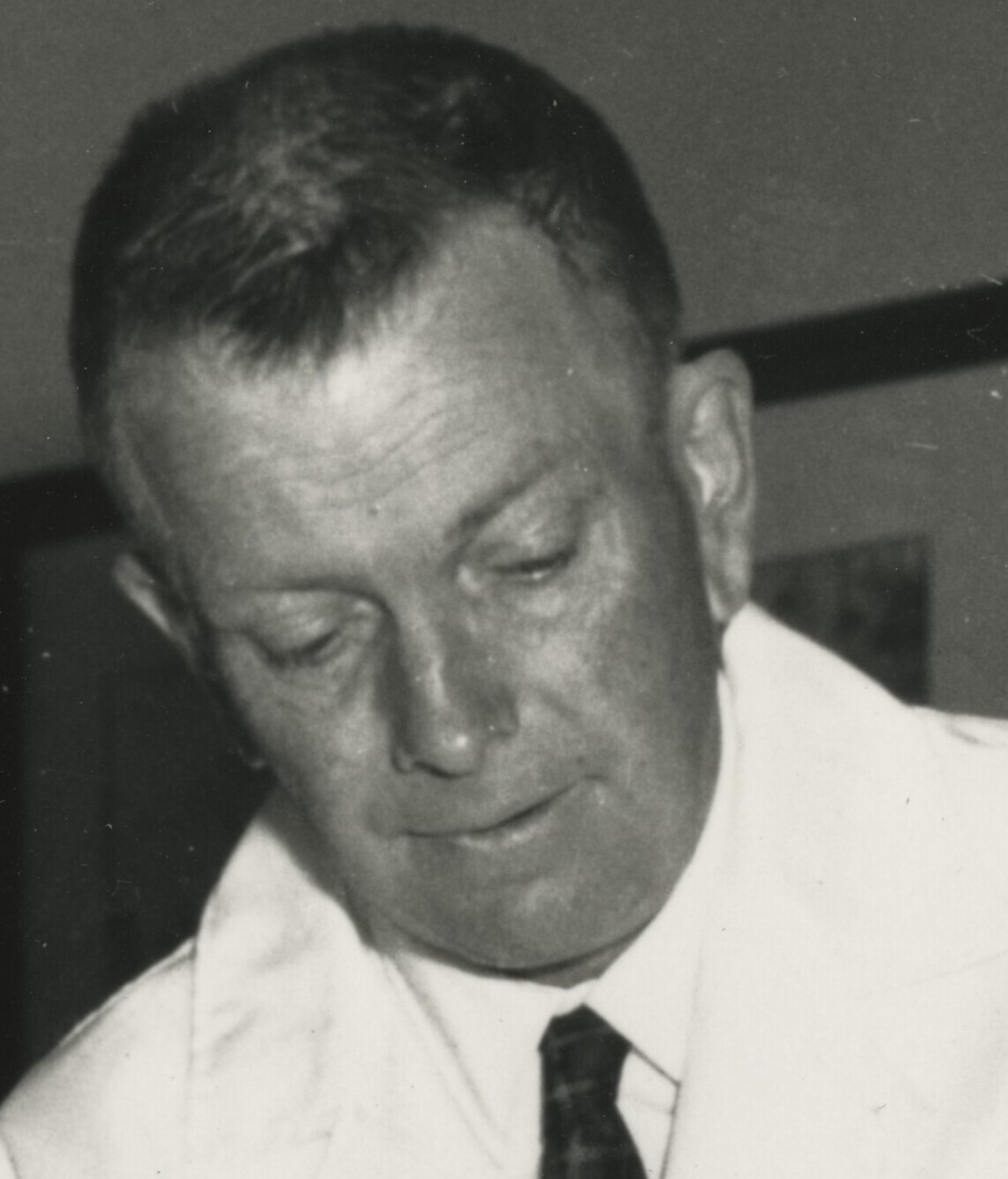
Bushland in 1950

Raymond C. Bushland (October 5, 1910 – January 29, 1995) was an American entomologist. He was awarded the 1992 World Food Prize with his colleague Edward F. Knipling for their combined efforts in the development of the sterile insect technique (SIT).

== Early life and education ==
Bushland grew up in South Dakota and studied zoology and entomology at the University of South Dakota, earning a master's degree in 1934. He received a PhD from Kansas State University in 1953.

== Career ==
He then worked as an entomologist in the research department of the United States Department of Agriculture (USDA) in Dallas and from 1937 in Menard, Texas, where he met Knipling and did research with him on the New World screwworm Cochliomyia hominivorax. Their larvae were at the time a major parasite of cattle and caused great losses in US agriculture.

The two developed the sterile insect technique after World War II. They tested their method on Sanibel Island and nearly eradicated the New World screwworm there with SIT. The method was also successfully tested on Curacao in 1954 and controlled the parasite in parts of the United States in the 1960s and 1970s. In 1958, the fly was eradicated in Florida and throughout the American Southwest by the early 1960s. It was eradicated from the entirety of the US in 1982. In the 1980s, the technique was used successfully in Central America, with Panama erecting a barrier against new infections from South America. It was later used successfully on other flies, such as the tsetse fly. Bushland also conducted research into combating lice that spread typhus in New Guinea and the Philippines during World War II.

In 1963, Bushland became the director of the USDA Metabolism and Radiation Research Laboratory in Fargo, North Dakota. He retired in 1974. Bushland died, aged 84, in Kerrville, Texas, on January 29, 1995.

== Awards and honors ==
Bushland received the 1949 US Typhus Commission Award for his work on typhus. In 1967, he received the USDA's Distinguished Service Award for his work on the sterile insect technique. In 1992, he was awarded the World Food Prize with Knipling.

In 1999, the Knipling-Bushland Southwest Animal Research Foundation was established at Texas A&M University.

In 2016, he and Knipling were posthumously awarded the Golden Goose Award.
