= Edward F. Knipling =

American entomologist

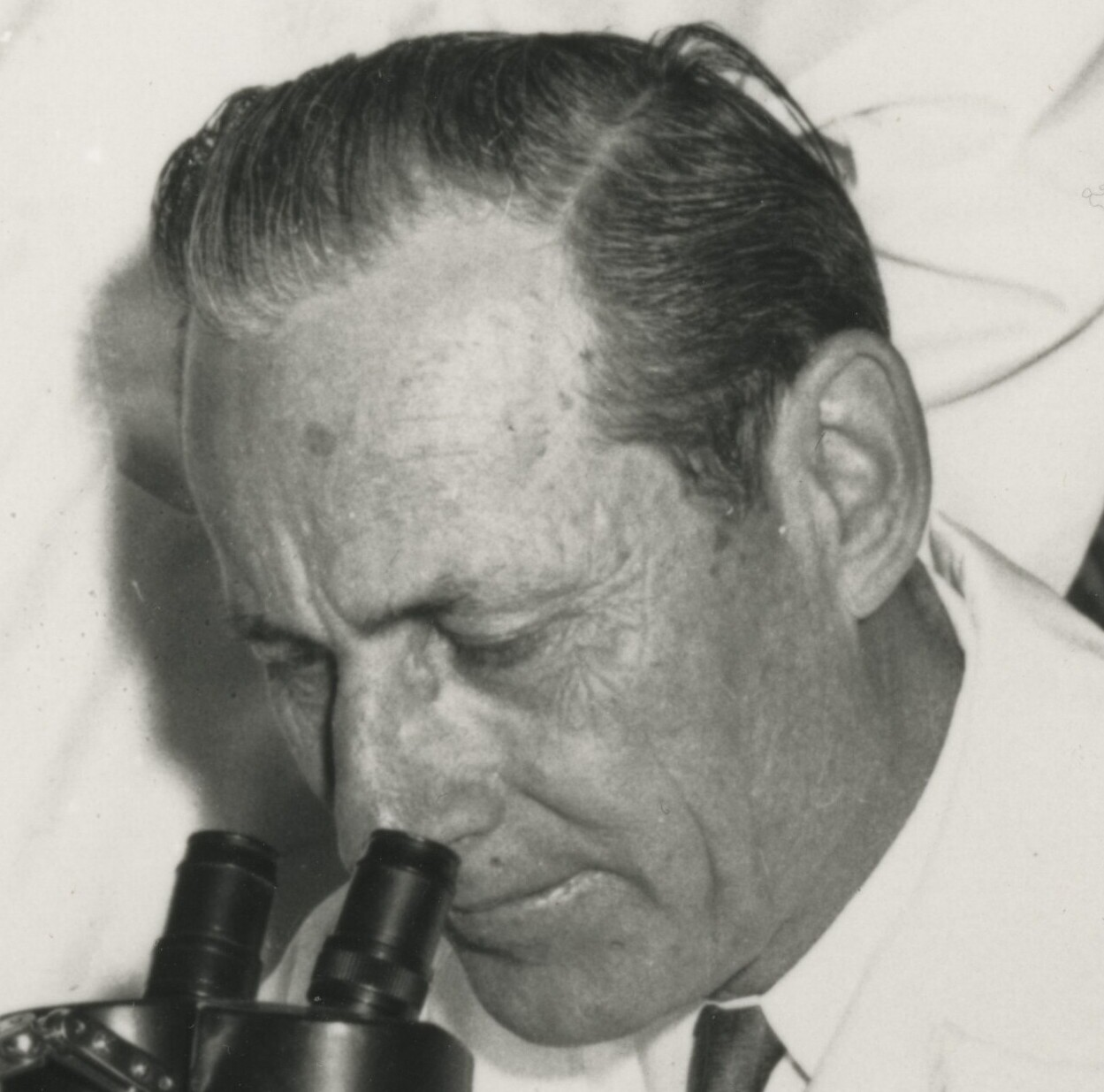
- Knipling in 1950
- Born: March 20, 1909; Victoria, Texas, U.S.
- Died: March 17, 2000 (aged 90); Arlington, Virginia, U.S.
- Education: Texas A&M University; Iowa State University
- Awards: President's Award for Distinguished Federal Civilian Service (1971); National Medal of Science; Japan Prize
- Scientific career
- Fields: Entomology

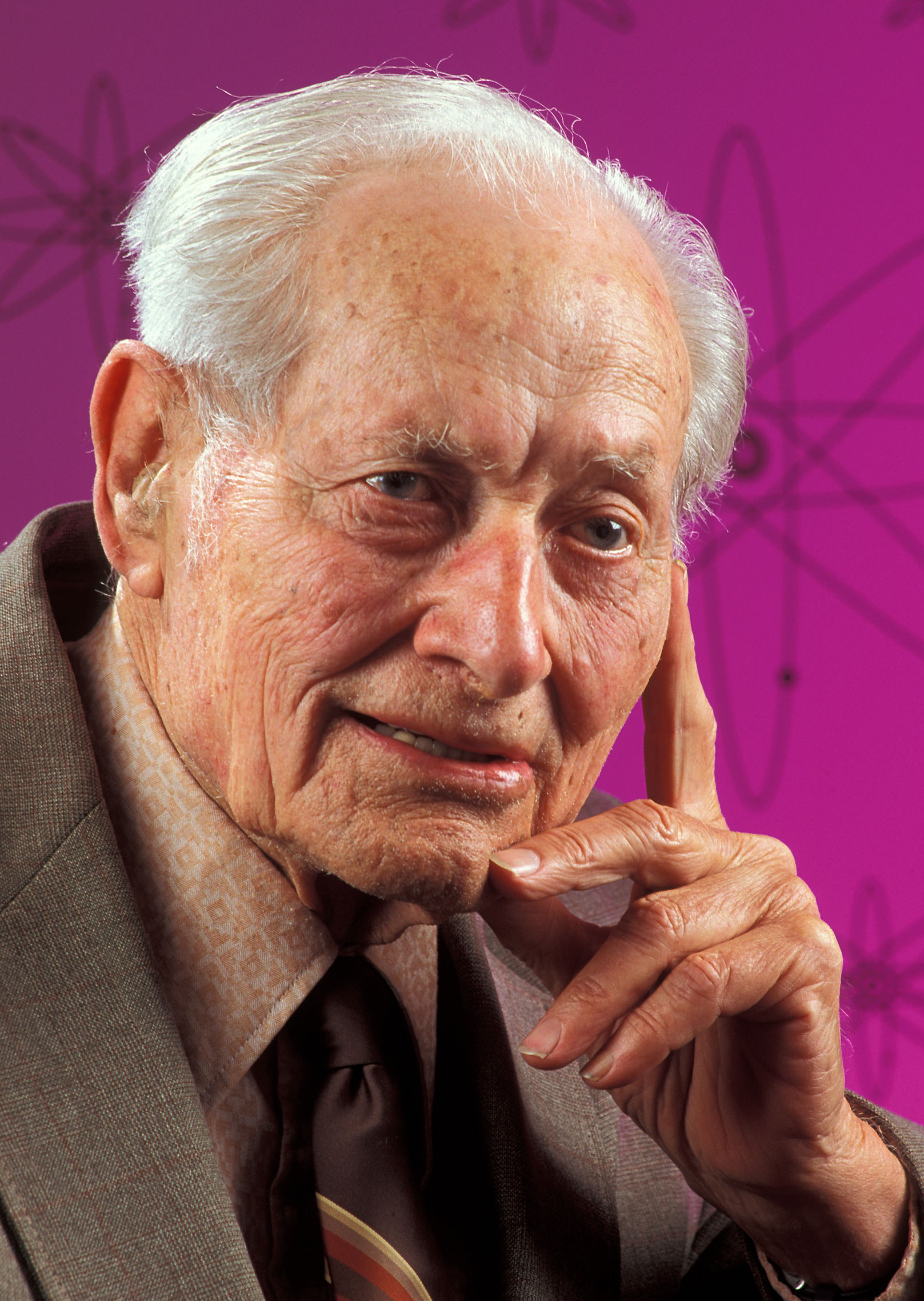
Knipling post-retirement

Edward Fred Knipling (March 20, 1909 – March 17, 2000) was an American entomologist, who along with his longtime colleague Raymond C. Bushland, received the 1992 World Food Prize for their collaborative achievements in developing the sterile insect technique for eradicating or suppressing the threat posed by pests to the livestock and crops that contribute to the world's food supply. Knipling's contributions included the parasitoid augmentation technique, insect control methods involving the medication of the hosts, and various models of total insect population management. Knipling was best known as the inventor of the sterile insect technique (SIT), an autocidal theory of total insect population management. The New York Times Magazine proclaimed on January 11, 1970, that "Knipling...has been credited by some scientists as having come up with 'the single most original thought in the 20th century.'"

== Education and early career ==
Knipling was born on March 20, 1909, in Port Lavaca, Texas. As a youth raising cattle with his father, he saw firsthand the devastation that the screwworm fly and other pests wreaked on cattle herds and cotton crops. Following graduation from Texas A&M University and graduate studies at Iowa State University, Knipling began researching the screwworm fly in 1931 as a U.S. Department of Agriculture entomologist in Texas, where he met Bushland. Together, the men theorized about possibly breaking the pest's lifecycle by inducing genetic defects, but their research was temporarily suspended by the outbreak of World War II.

=== Achievements during World War II ===
During the war, Knipling's research was diverted to support U.S. Army efforts to repel and control insects that threatened Allied troops with diseases including typhus and malaria. Credited with leading the USDA team that developed DDT as an effective control of body lice and weapon against typhus, Knipling won the 1947 U.S. Medal of Merit and the 1948 King's Medal for Service from the United Kingdom for these achievements.

== Development of SIT ==
After the war, Knipling received a Ph.D. in entomology from Iowa State University and moved to Washington, D.C., to lead USDA entomology research. In this capacity, he continued working with Bushland to complete the development of SIT in the early 1950s. Knipling remained at the USDA until 1973, eventually serving as the top entomological researcher in the Agricultural Research Service. For 27 years thereafter, he remained active as a USDA consultant and collaborator, contributing significantly to new principles of pest insect management.

Knipling died on March 17, 2000, in Arlington, Virginia, where his wife of 66 years, Phoebe Hall Knipling, and he had raised their five children and were active members of the community. Phoebe was also a biological scientist and educator. One of his sons, Edward B. Knipling, served as administrator of the USDA Agricultural Research Service from 2004 to 2014.

== Awards and recognition ==
Knipling published over 225 articles in his career, was inducted into the National Academy of Sciences, received the 1966 National Medal of Science and the 1995 Japan Prize for his novel approaches to pest control, and was listed in Life magazine as one of the "100 Most Important People in the World" in 1970. Knipling was posthumously awarded the Golden Goose Award in 2016.

Since 1999, the Knipling-Bushland Southwest Animal Research Foundation at Texas A&M has supported research and education in the area where food producers around the world continue to feel his influence today.

Honorary titles
Preceded by Nevin S. Scrimshaw	World Food Prize; 1992	Succeeded by He Kang
