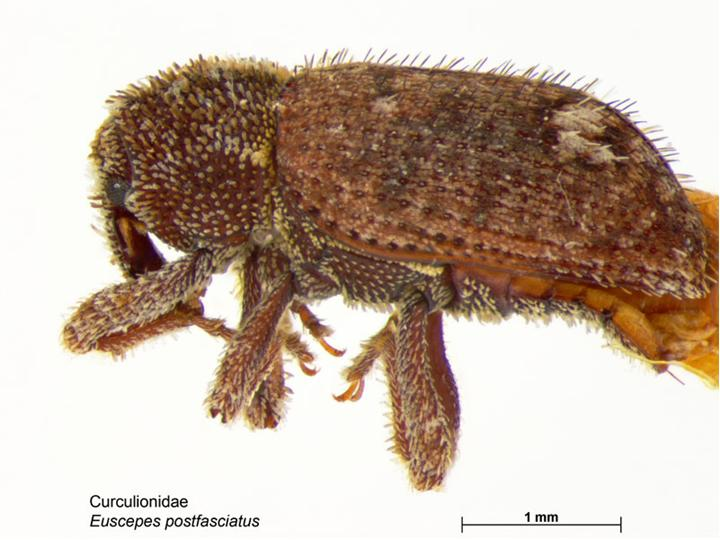

Scientific classification
- Kingdom: Animalia
- Phylum: Arthropoda
- Clade: Pancrustacea
- Class: Insecta
- Order: Coleoptera
- Suborder: Polyphaga
- Infraorder: Cucujiformia
- Family: Curculionidae
- Genus: Euscepes
- Species: E. postfasciatus

Binomial name
- Euscepes postfasciatus (Fairmaire, 1849)

Synonyms
- Cryptorhynchus batatae (Waterhouse, 1849); Euscepes batatae Waterhouse, 1849; Hyperomorpha squamosa Blackburn, 1885

= Euscepes postfasciatus =

Species of beetle

Euscepes postfasciatus, the west Indian sweetpotato weevil, is a species of hidden snout weevil in the family Curculionidae. It is found in North America.
