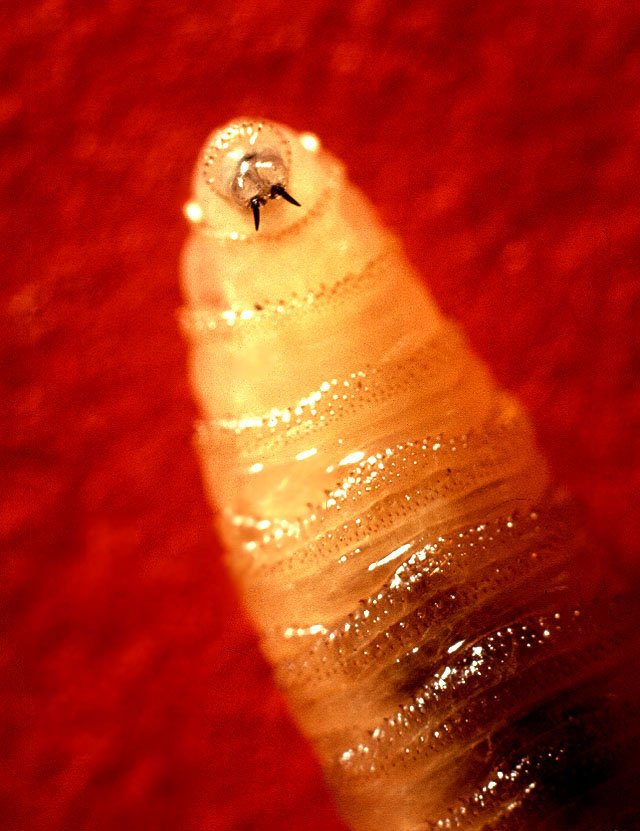
- C. hominivorax larva
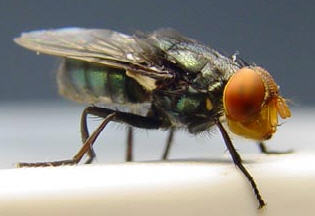
- C. hominivorax adult

Scientific classification
- Kingdom: Animalia
- Phylum: Arthropoda
- Clade: Pancrustacea
- Class: Insecta
- Order: Diptera
- Family: Calliphoridae
- Subfamily: Chrysomyinae
- Genus: Cochliomyia; Townsend, 1915

Type species
- Musca macellaria Fabricius, 1775

= Cochliomyia =

Genus of insects

Cochliomyia is a genus in the family Calliphoridae, known as blowflies, in the order Diptera. Four species are in this genus: C. macellaria, C. hominivorax, C. aldrichi, and C. minima. C. hominivorax is known as the primary screwworm (or "New World screwworm") because its larvae produce myiasis and feed on living tissue. This feeding causes deep, pocket-like lesions in the skin, which can be very damaging to the animal host. C. macellaria is known as the secondary screwworm because its larvae produce myiasis, but feed only on necrotic tissue. Both C. hominivorax and C. macellaria thrive in warm, tropical areas. They are considered an agricultural pest of farm animals and the United States has partnered with Mexico and Central American countries to eradicate the fly via the sterile insect technique (releasing overwhelming numbers of sterilized males into infested areas). It has been suggested that some Cochliomyia may be a suitable target for an extinction gene drive.

== Characteristics ==
=== Adult ===
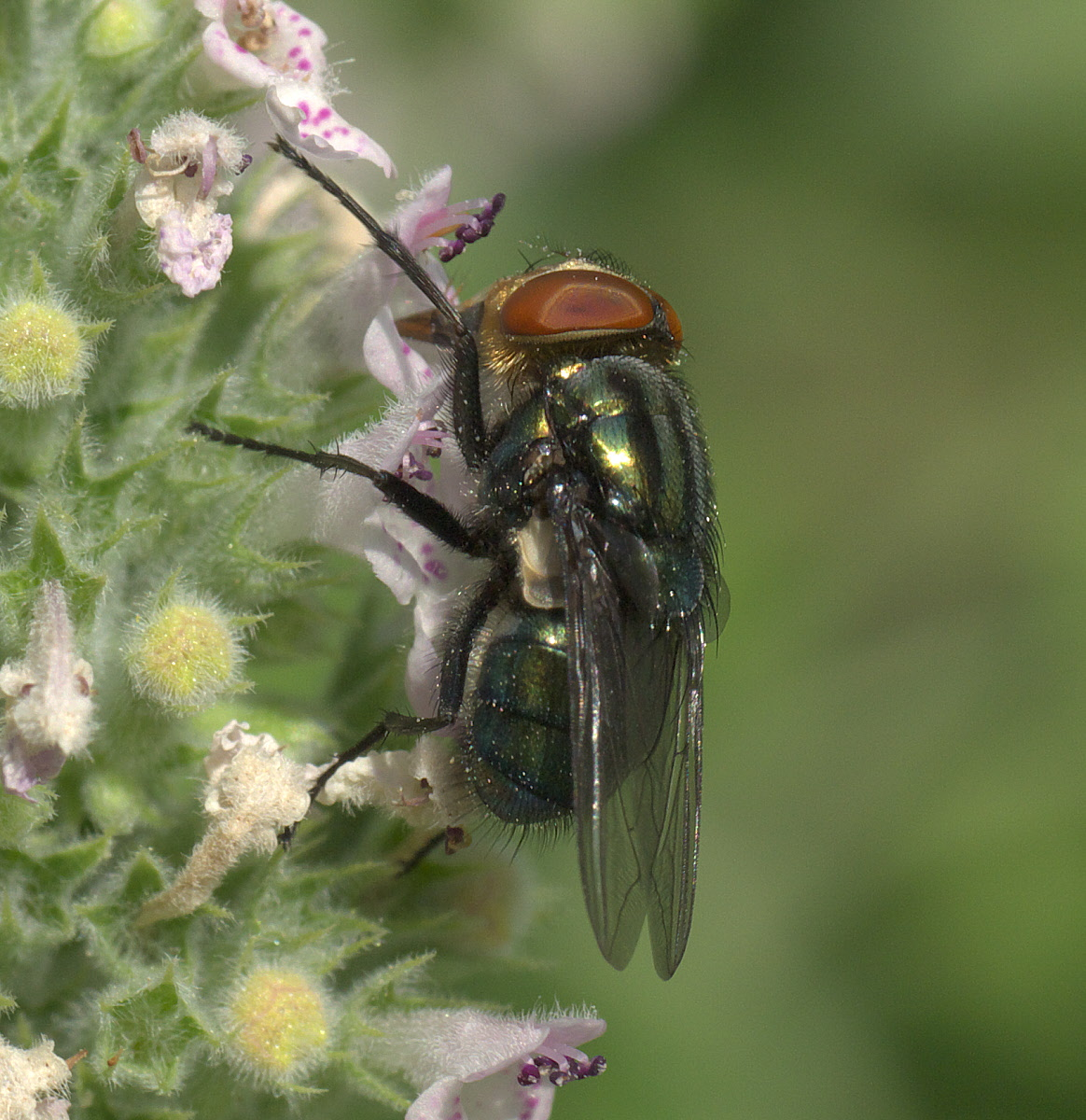
C. macellaria adult

In general, all Diptera have three body regions (head, thorax, and abdomen), three pairs of legs, one pair of forewings used for flight, one pair of halteres which are modified hindwings, and one pair of antennae.

New World screwworm flies share many characteristics with the common house fly. For keying out a dipteran specimen, it is important whether bristles on the meron are present or absent. All species in the family Calliphoridae have bristles on their merones, plumose arista, and well-developed calypters. Both C. macellaria and C. hominivorax are metallic green to bluish green in major coloration, with setae on the dorsal surface of the stem vein, orange gena, pale white anterior spiracles, filiform palps, and three black longitudinal stripes (vittae) on the notum of the thorax. The species C. macellaria has pale setulae on the fronto-orbital plate outside the row of frontal bristles, while C. hominivorax has dark setulae on the fronto-orbital plate outside the row of frontal bristles. The female C. macellaria has a yellowish basicosta, while the female C. hominivorax has a brown basicosta. C. macellaria is 6–9 millimetres (1/4–11/32 inch) in length. C. hominivorax is 8–10 mm (5/16–13/32 in) in length.

=== Larvae ===
The larvae of both C. macellaria and C. hominivorax have cylindrical bodies tapering anteriorly with 10 or more robust spines around the spiracular area, incomplete peritremes, an indistinct or absent button, and bands of small spines on each segment. The C. hominivorax larvae have distinctly pigmented tracheal trunks. C. macellaria larvae do not have pigmented tracheal trunks; they have spines in a V shape on the anal protuberance and no oral sclerite. The mature third instars of both species' larvae can reach a length of 17 mm (21/32 in).

== Life cycle ==
The general life cycle of Cochliomyia is similar to other Diptera in that they are holometabolous. The four stages are egg, larva, pupa, and adult. This entire life cycle lasts an average of 21 days under optimal conditions (preferably a warm, moist environment), and can last as long as three months in colder climates. Females only lay eggs once in a lifetime and can lay 100 to 400 in a clutch. Females usually lay their eggs on the edge of an open wound. Warm and moist conditions are the perfect combination of home and food source. The nasal, oral, or anal areas of a host are especially prone to Cochliomyia oviposition.

Larvae hatch about 12–21 hours after the eggs have been laid, and are cream colored. C. hominivorax larvae dive head-first into whatever food source is nearest, and burrow deeper, eating into live flesh if available. This results in a pocket-like lesion that causes severe pain to the host. C. macellaria larvae only feed on the necrotic tissue of a wound. After five to seven days, the larvae drop and move away from the food source to pupate. The larvae burrow into the topsoil, beneath leaves or garbage, and begin their pupation. The pupa is a dark brown color. This stage can last from seven days at a warm temperature to as long as two months if the weather is much colder. Adults emerge and spend a day or two finishing maturity. Adults of C. hominivorax breed only once in their lifetimes. Sexually mature adults breed 3–4 days after emerging from the pupa. Males mature rapidly and spend their time waiting, eating nearby vegetation, and nectar of flowers. Females, however, are predatory and feed on the fluids from live wounds. Females can fly long distances to find a mate. Adult flies of this species live around two to three weeks.

== Cochliomyia hominivorax ==
=== Biology ===
The primary screwworm, C. hominivorax (also called the New World screwworm), is a parasitic species, whose larvae are renowned for eating and infesting the flesh of living organisms, primarily warm-blooded animals such as cattle and other livestock. Their larvae cause myiasis ("flystrike"), an infestation of maggots in lesions or other wounds and injuries that the host animal may have. Flystrike may occur due to farming processes as branding, castrating, dehorning, and tailing of the host animals. These processes, along with barbed-wire cuts and flea bites, lead to myiasis in the host animal. The navels of newborns can also be the sites of infestation. C. hominivorax tends to reproduce only on the flesh of a living host. Unlike most other maggots, these maggots attack and consume healthy living tissue along with decaying tissue (hominivorax literally translates to "man-eating"). The larvae are responsible for their common name, the screwworm, because they possess small spines on each body segment that resemble a screw's threads. After the larvae hatch, they dive into the wound and burrow deeper, perpendicular to the skin surface, eating into live flesh, again resembling a screw being driven into an object. The larvae then continue to feed on the wound fluids and the animal's tissue.

=== Elimination programs ===
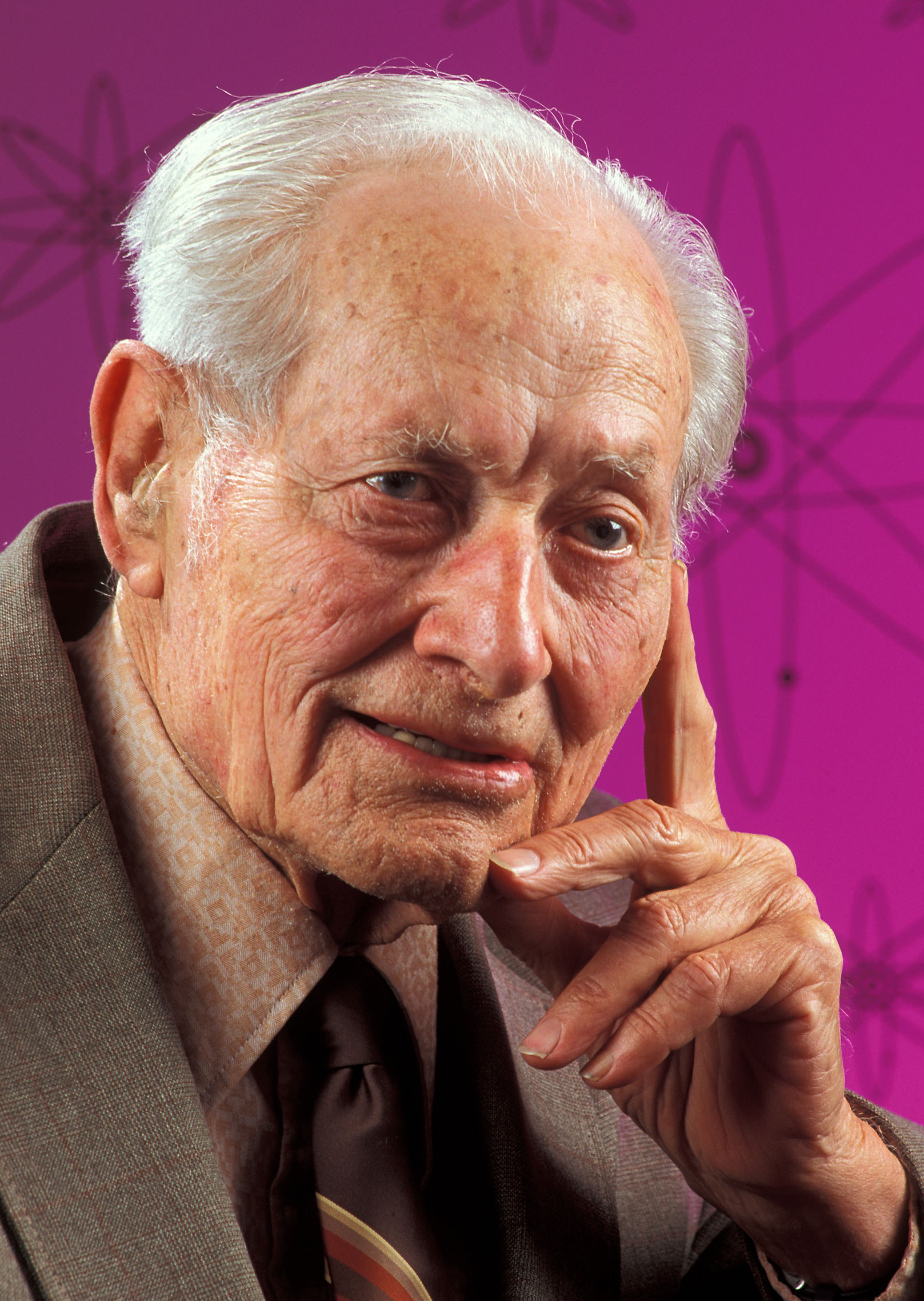
Entomologist Edward F. Knipling proposed the sterile insect technique.

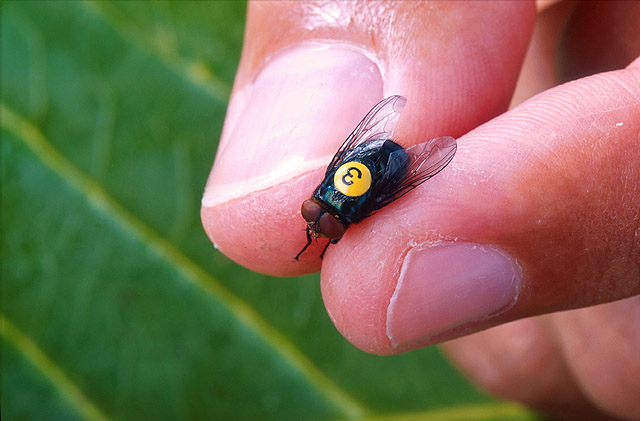
Sterile C. hominivorax male labeled with a number to study the behavior, dispersal, and longevity of the fly

==== North and Central Americas ====
The sterile insect technique was proposed by scientists Edward F. Knipling and Raymond C. Bushland, and was rapidly adopted by the United States Department of Agriculture in 1958. The technique centers on a unique reproductive handicap that prevents female C. hominivorax flies from mating more than once. The scientists reasoned that if it were possible to clinically sterilize and release huge numbers of males as breeding time approached, fertile males might be outcompeted. The majority of female flies would lay sterile eggs. Irradiating the males was used for sterilization.

Because the agricultural industry was losing millions of dollars annually due to treatment and loss of fly-struck animals, this solution was quickly approved for testing. It was first applied on a large scale in Florida in the 1950s, due to the severity of the problem there and the state's unique island-mimicking geography, which allowed for relative isolation of the Florida C. hominivorax population. The eradication of Florida's primary screwworm population was completed in 1959. The program was then applied throughout the southern United States. Eventually, it was adopted throughout much of Mexico in 1972 and parts of Central and South America. The primary screwworm was completely eradicated from the southern United States in 1966, from Mexico in 1991, and from Central America in the early 2000s, down to the Panama-Colombia border. Livestock there continue to be vulnerable, however, and strict laws regarding animal inspection and reporting of suspected infestations remain in place.

A new screwworm infestation in the Florida Keys was first reported in October 2016, which was mostly in the Key deer population, along with five confirmed infestations in domestic animals. In response, the United States Department of Agriculture (USDA) released over 80 million sterile flies from 25 ground release sites on twelve islands and in the town of Marathon.

There is an ongoing program between the USDA and Panama, the Comisión Panamá–Estados Unidos para la Erradicación y Prevención del Gusano Barrenador del Ganado (COPEG) to prevent the return of screwworm to countries where it has been eliminated and further extend prevention efforts into Colombia.

In November 2024, screwworm was detected in farms in Mexico, causing the USDA to halt imports of cattle, horses, and bison from there. Concern about possible further spread led the USDA to announce that it will spend up to $750 million on a new elimination program including an $8.5 million, 300 million fly per week production facility at Moore Air Force Base in Edinburg, Texas, which will likely take 2 to 3 years to build. The USDA is also partnering with Mexico by funding $21 million of a new $51 million, 100 million sterile fly per week production plant in southern Mexico near the Guatemala border projected to open in mid 2026. The only facility currently producing sterile flies is in Panama; that facility produces 100 million per week.

In late May 2026, the United States Department of Agriculture reported a screwworm infestation in a young sheep in northern Mexico 31 miles (50 km) from the United States border. In early June 2026, the U.S. Animal and Plant Health Inspection Service confirmed a case of screwworm infestation in Zavala County, Texas.

==== North Africa ====
The first, and to date the largest, documented infestation of C. hominivorax myiasis outside of the Americas occurred in North Africa from 1989 to 1991. The outbreak was traced to a herd of sheep in Libya's Tripoli region, which began suffering screwworm attacks in July 1989; over the following months, the myiasis spread rapidly, infecting numerous herds across a 25,000 km^{2} area. Eventually, the infested region spanned from the Mediterranean coast to the Sahara Desert, threatening the more than 2.7 million animals susceptible to C. hominivorax that inhabited the area. More than 14,000 cases of large-scale myiasis due to the C. hominivorax species were documented. Traditional control methods using veterinary assessment and treatment of individual animals were insufficient to contain the widely dispersed outbreak, so the United Nations Food and Agriculture Organization launched a program based on the sterile insect technique. About 1.26 billion sterile flies were produced in Mexico, shipped to the infested area, and released to mate with their wild counterparts. Within months, the C. hominivorax population collapsed; by April 1991, the program had succeeded in eradicating C. hominivorax in the Eastern Hemisphere. This effort, which cost under US$100 million, was declared to have been among the most efficient and successful international animal health programs in UN history.

The North African outbreak both provided proof of the sterile male technique's efficacy and led to numerous enhancements in its implementation; after 1991, it entered into use across parts of Central and South America. However, the inaccessibility of some areas that the fly inhabits, language differences, and the need for constant vigilance have slowed the eradication of this species.

=== Current research ===
Research is currently being performed to develop a synthetic odor bait to replace the use of wounded animals as bait for the females of C. hominivorax. This previously used method has fallen out of favor. The synthetic bait is formulated to mimic natural wound fluid from animals. The female flies are attracted to animal wounds to obtain a protein meal and to oviposit. The synthetic bait could be used at research stations that monitor for flies in regions where they are eradicated and to help decrease the screwworm populations in infested regions.

== Cochliomyia macellaria ==
=== General information ===
The secondary screwworm, C. macellaria, is a flesh-eating fly whose larvae consume only necrotic tissue, either that of carrion or of an animal or human host (myiasis). This important distinction between C. macellaria and C. hominivorax was not understood for much of medical history; myiasis of humans and animals was viewed as universally disastrous. However, as medical understanding of the process of tissue breakdown and infection progressed, it was observed that wounds with specific types of maggot infestation actually had a decreased severity and duration of infection. This progressed to the point where C. macellaria larvae were being applied in some cases as surgical maggots. However, the negative connotation surrounding the word “screwworm” has persisted, and the largely harmless secondary screwworms are often blamed for myiasitic attacks for which primary screwworms are actually responsible. This should not be interpreted to mean that C. macellaria is not an avid consumer of flesh; it is routinely among the first colonisers of carrion, and in forensic cases has long had a habit of literally consuming evidence. Secondary screwworms are especially abundant on corpses and carrion in warm, direct sunlit areas. Fortunately, with the recent advent of molecular evidence, C. macellaria maggots removed from a body and boiled to sterility can now provide vital information regarding a victim and determining a post mortem interval. Forensic entomologists can use various extraction methods to test the composition of the alimentary canal of the larvae to determine if victims had any drugs or mind-altering substances in their systems before they were killed. It is important, though, for forensic entomologists to determine whether the Old World screwworm, Chrysomya rufifacies, is present in the maggot masses on the body, because C. rufifacies is usually after C. macellaria in the succession of colonising a body and C. rufifacies second- and third-instar larvae are facultatively predatory. This could result in a post mortem interval being off by a few days at the most if the C. rufifacies were to prey upon all of the C. macellaria larvae.

Secondary screwworms have the stereotypical metallic green body of the genus, and the larvae are extremely similar to those of C. hominivorax. The most effective way to differentiate the two is to note the absence on C. macellaria of the distinctive pigmented tracheal tubes, as well as the presence of a V-shaped pattern of spines on the anal protuberance, and the lack of an oral sclerite.

=== Medical usage ===
Interaction between humans and C. macellaria outside of accidental secondary myiasis has been largely unremarkable, with the notable exception of their early use in surgical maggot therapy. However, given the medical stigma surrounding the screwworm fly, and the slight potential for even C. macellaria to secondarily infest tissue beyond the desired extent of medical use, it has currently fallen out of favor with the medical community, which prefers the predictable Lucilia sericata.

== Human management ==
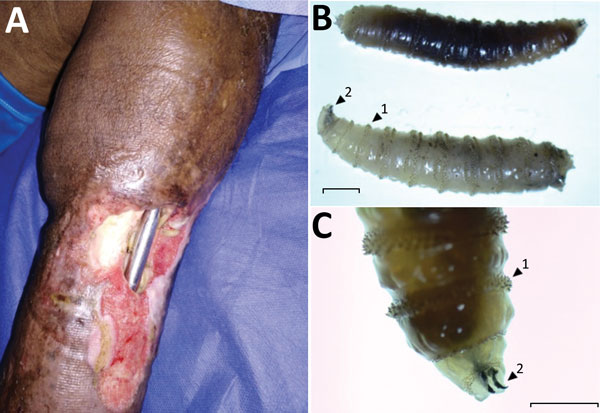
Pin-site myiasis in a 77-year-old man 12 years after tibial osteosynthesis, Colombia. A) Open wound in the man's left leg, showing multiple insect larvae. B, C) Cochliomyia hominivorax screwworm fly larvae extracted from the wound. Arrow 1 indicates the spinose bands; note the spines arranged in 4 rows that separate each segment. Arrow 2 indicates its mouth hooks. Scale bars indicate 2 mm (B) and 1 mm (C).

Primary screwworms are primary, obligate parasites in the larval stage, and as a result are capable, unlike secondary screwworms, of initiating the penetration of the skin barrier to create an entry wound. Despite this, they are most commonly seen as colonisers of previously existing wounds, and frequently are hatched from eggs laid at the perimeter of a wound. Once the infestation commences, a dark brown or reddish-brown discharge begins leaking from the wound, sometimes accompanied by an unpleasant odor as the flesh begins to decay. This is often the first sign in both livestock and human victims that something is amiss, and often initiates consultation with a professional. As the infestation increases, the victim begins to experience escalating tissue irritation, and in the case of domesticated animals, may be observed to become withdrawn, listless, and anorexic.

Once the process of clinical diagnosis begins and myiasis is recognised, the larvae are fairly easy to identify. Their overall body structure resembles the spiraled screw shape on which their common name is based, a shape fairly unusual within parasitic larvae. The cranial end of the larvae has two sharply curved hooks, generally dark in color, and distinctive spiracle patterns are observed at the caudal end. The most identifying features, and the easiest way to differentiate between C. hominivorax and C. macellaria, are the prominent darkened tracheal tubes which are visible in the final third of the larval body of the former, and are often visible both with a microscope and to the naked eye.

Treatment of the victim can be time-consuming and, due to the high incidence of secondary infection, frustrating, but with decisive treatment, a surprisingly positive result is often achieved in all but the worst cases. The obvious first step is the manual removal of the maggots, generally using tweezers or forceps to seize the larva at the posterior end as the spiracles emerge to allow respiration. Once all larvae have been removed, a topical antibiotic smear is applied, often with an oral antibiotic. Necrotic tissue may need to be debrided, which can be a painful process. A loose dressing is essential to allow continued drainage from the wound.

As with many things, prevention is the best cure. Any open wound, even one so small as a blister, is a potential infestation site and should be treated accordingly with approved pesticides. At times of the year when livestock are most vulnerable (castration, birthing, etc.), daily inspections should be conducted when possible. Infestations detected early are quite treatable, but fatalities can and do result from advanced infestation, particularly in sheep and newborn calves.

Secondary screwworms appear only around an existing wound (wound in this case being defined as including the opened cord area of newborn livestock), so practice facultative myiasis. They are attracted most strongly to infected wounds due to the strong odor of the wound's discharge, but even a small blister or abrasion can serve as an infestation site. Flies can also be induced to lay their eggs in hair or wool that is matted thickly and stained with any bodily fluid.

As with C. hominivorax, the first sign of an infestation is often the irritated surface of the wound, producing many of the same symptoms. The larvae can be diagnosed and identified by a trained professional based on larval size, shape (again following the spiraled screw-shape), and ultimately on spiracle pattern. These larvae lack the distinctive pigmented tracheal tubes that mark C. hominivorax.

As the secondary screwworm does not have the biological characteristic of single lifetime breeding as does C. hominivorax, no widespread control methods are currently in place beyond the usual pesticide spraying done for general fly control. However, due to its being associated with facultative myiasis, its impact on livestock in the United States is not nearly as severe. It can also be associated with human infestation in poorly run medical facilities and areas stricken by poverty, so vigilance is essential.

== Distribution ==
Both species thrive in tropical areas that are warm and humid. C. macellaria is the most common species of the two in North America, distributed throughout northern South America, Central America, Caribbean Islands, the United States, and southern Canada.

C. hominivorax was distributed throughout northern South America, Central America, the Caribbean Islands, and the United States before the use of the sterile insect technique, after which it was eliminated from the US and Mexico. However, the bordering Central American countries pose a challenge to keep the species eliminated, since these countries still have populations of this fly. Many of these countries continue to implement elimination programs.
