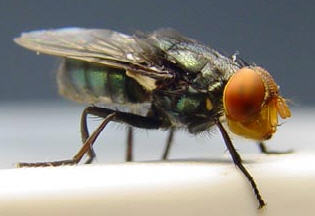

Scientific classification
- Kingdom: Animalia
- Phylum: Arthropoda
- Clade: Pancrustacea
- Class: Insecta
- Order: Diptera
- Family: Calliphoridae
- Genus: Cochliomyia
- Species: C. hominivorax

Binomial name
- Cochliomyia hominivorax (Coquerel, 1858)

= Cochliomyia hominivorax =

Species of fly

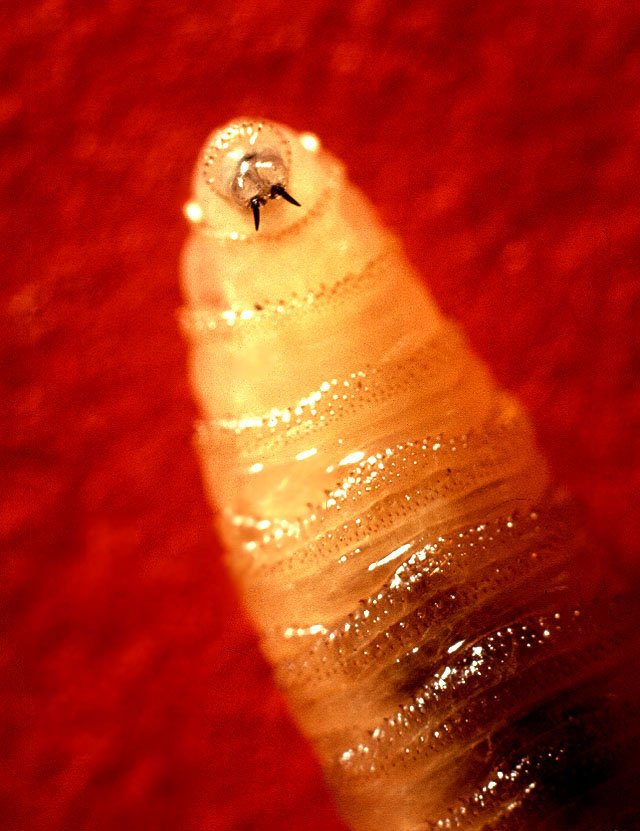
Larva

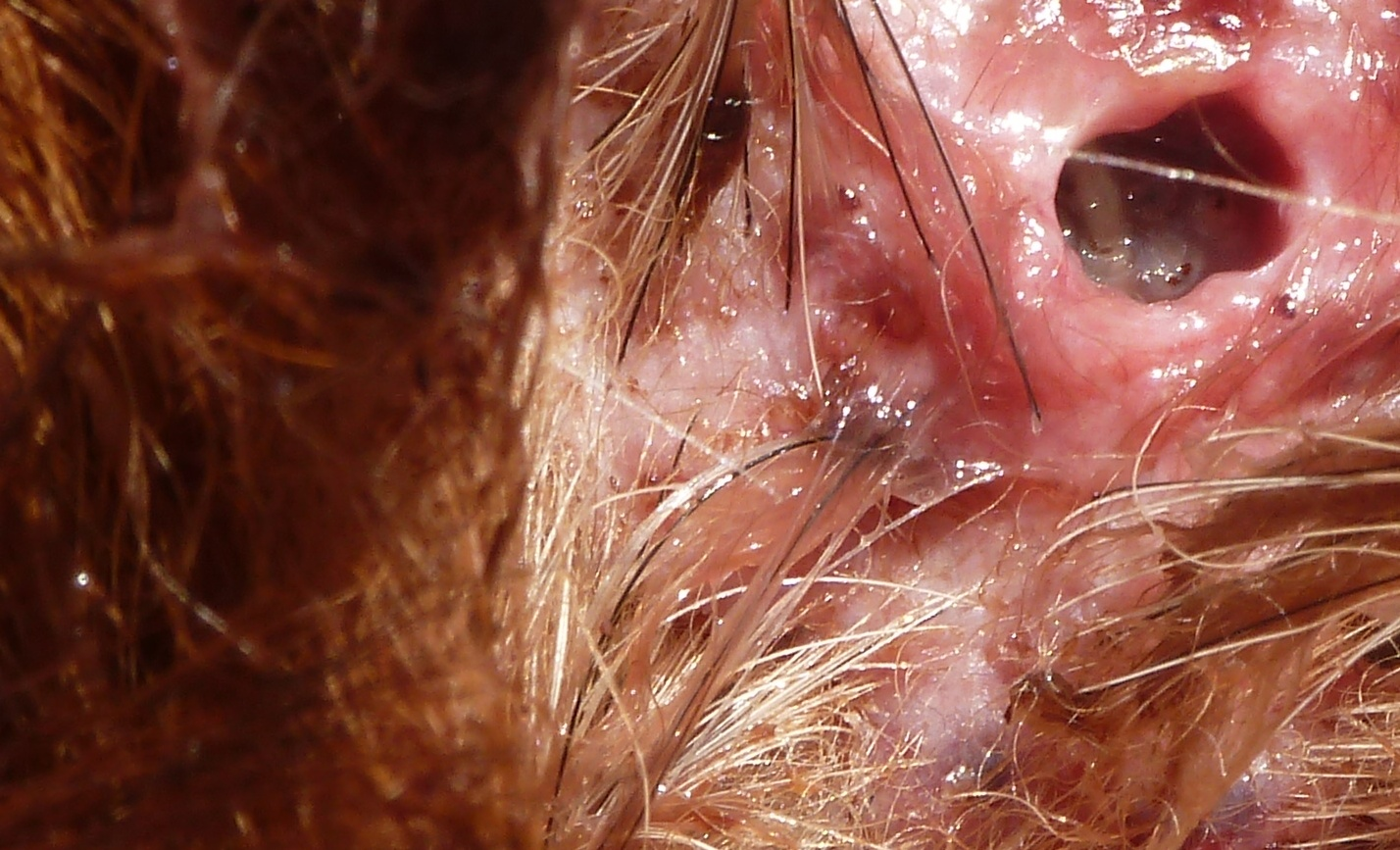
New World screwworm larvae in a Belgian Shepherd dog

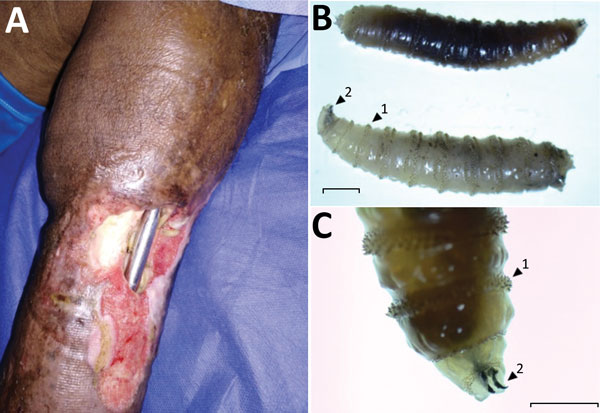
Pin-site myiasis in a 77-year-old man 12 years after tibial osteosynthesis, Colombia. A) Open wound in the man's left leg, showing multiple insect larvae. B, C) Cochliomyia hominivorax screwworm fly larvae extracted from the wound. Arrow 1 indicates the spinose bands; note the spines arranged in 4 rows that separate each segment. Arrow 2 indicates its mouth hooks. Scale bars indicate 2 mm (B) and 1 mm (C).

Cochliomyia hominivorax, (Note: Presumed to be from the Greek kochlias (snail with a spiral shell) + myia (fly) and the Latin hominis (man) + vorax (consuming), Cochliomyia hominivorax, or the New World screwworm fly (formerly Callitroga (Greek kallos, (beautiful), + trogein, (to gnaw), Americana), was first described by French entomologist Charles Coquerel in 1858.) the New World screwworm fly, New World screwworm (NWS) or simply screwworm or screw-worm, is a species of parasitic blowfly whose larvae (maggots) feed on living tissue of warm-blooded animals. It is present in the New World tropics (and also currently found in the United States as of 2026). Of the four species of Cochliomyia, only C. hominivorax is parasitic; a single parasitic species of Old World screwworm fly is placed in a different genus (Chrysomya bezziana). Infestation of a live vertebrate animal by a maggot is scientifically termed myiasis. While the maggots of many fly species eat dead flesh, and may occasionally infest an old and putrid wound, screwworm maggots are unusual because they attack healthy tissue. This increases the chances of infection and the damaged tissue attracts more flies.

The New World screwworm fly was the first species on which the sterile insect technique was tested and then applied in a natural environment, resulting in the control and systematic eradication of this species from the United States, Central America, and parts of the Caribbean beginning in the 1950s. By the early 2000s, it was considered eradicated from North America. However, in 2024 and 2025, the New World screwworm was once again detected in Mexico, and as of 2026 in Texas as well, leading to renewed efforts to prevent its re-emergence as a threat to agriculture. Meanwhile, the fly is still widespread in tropical and subtropical parts of the Caribbean and South America, so animals imported from these areas to non-endemic regions must be inspected or treated to prevent the pest's reintroduction.

== Life cycle ==
New World screwworm flies are obligate parasites, as their larvae require living tissue for food. This lifestyle distinguishes them from other members of the genus, whose larvae primarily feed on necrotic tissue or excrement. These other Cochliomyia flies, such as Cochliomyia macellaria, are facultative parasites, in that they sometimes lay eggs on lesions already infested with C. hominivorax to produce secondary myiasis. Thus they are considered "secondary" screwworm flies, while C. hominivorax is "primary".

The New World screwworm fly prefers to lay its eggs near wounds, such as those caused by dehorning or castration, but also near the navel of newborns or on insect bites. Healthy areas with soft tissue or body orifices can also be infested, such as the inner corner of the eye (medial canthus) or the perineum. The New World screwworm fly infests wild and domestic animals, and less frequently birds and humans. Cold-blooded (poikilothermic) animals or carrion cannot be infested.

Screwworm females lay 250–500 eggs in the exposed flesh of warm-blooded animals. The larvae hatch and burrow into the surrounding tissue as they feed. Should the wound be disturbed during this time, the larvae burrow or "screw" deeper into the flesh, hence the larva's common name. The maggots can cause severe tissue damage or even death to the host. About three to seven days after hatching, the larvae fall to the ground to pupate, emerging as adults about seven days later. Female screwworm flies mate four to five days after hatching.

The entire life cycle is around 20 days. A female can lay up to 3,000 eggs and fly up to 200 km (120 mi) during her life. Males mate up to ten times. They remain relatively isolated and hide in vegetation until they spot a female. Mating occurs on vegetation. Females copulate only once and retain the male's sperm for life, a fact which has been exploited in eradication programs using the sterile insect technique.

== Epidemiology ==
Historically, the original distribution area was the southern states of the United States, Mexico, Central America, and the northern states of South America south to Uruguay and northern Argentina. It was also present on some Caribbean islands, such as Cuba, Trinidad, Hispaniola, Jamaica, and Tobago. Currently, due to eradication programs, the species is distributed exclusively in South and Central America to the Panama Canal and some Caribbean islands. The populations in southern Argentina are dynamic. They depend primarily on temperature; in winter and early spring no infestations are recorded in the southern half of Argentina. While the extreme southern and former northern populations collapse during the winters, they remain stable in the tropics. Before its elimination in the US, the screwworm fly could spread as far as the Canadian border in favorable years. Dispersals occur at a rate of about 80 to 160 km (50 to 99 mi) per generation.

The United States officially eliminated the screwworm in 1982 using the sterile insect technique, although an isolated outbreak occurred in the Florida Keys, Monroe County, Florida, in autumn of 2016. The Florida government instituted control measures including mandatory inspections of all animals leaving the area; the outbreak was declared as neutralized in March 2017. The screwworm was eliminated in Guatemala and Belize in 1994, El Salvador in 1995, and Honduras in 1996. Campaigns against the flies continue in Mexico, Nicaragua, Costa Rica, Panama, and Jamaica with financial assistance from the United States Department of Agriculture (USDA), which is trying to push the parasite south of the narrow Isthmus of Panama. However, in December 2024, the screwworm was reported to have re-emerged in Southern Mexico, indicating that the protective barrier in Panama had been breached. Consequently, the USDA's Animal and Plant Health Inspection Service pledged emergency funding to help prevent the northern migration of this parasitic fly. The US government also stopped livestock imports from Mexico in May 2025 and again in July 2025 to prevent infected animals from entering the US as the movement of wild and domestic animals drives disease dispersion. As of August 23, 2026, 45 confirmed cases of New World screwworm have been reported across 16 counties in southern Texas and 1 confirmed case reported in Lea County, New Mexico.

== Attempts at eradication ==
Range of the New World screwworm

Due to the danger to livestock and to a lesser extent humans, the New World screwworm has been at the forefront of many attempts at elimination within regions. In 1954, the first tests using the sterile insect technique were conducted on Curaçao; the New World screwworm fly was successfully eliminated from the island within four months. From 1958 to 1960, the species was eliminated from the Southeastern and then the Southwestern United States. From 1966 to 2025, the species was considered extirpated from the US, but the species was once again detected in the US in 2026. The US and Mexico bred and released more than 94 billion sterile flies from 1962 to 1975.

Eradication efforts continued in Mexico (1972–1991), the Virgin Islands (1971–1972), Puerto Rico (1975), and Central America from Belize (1988–1992) to Guatemala (1988–1994), El Salvador (1991–1994), Honduras (1991–1996), Nicaragua (1992–1999), Costa Rica (1995–2000), and Panama (1997-2006). Authorities planned for a permanent barrier zone at the Isthmus of Tehuantepec, but it was clear by the mid-1980s that an eradication plan extending to the Darien Gap in Panama would be more beneficial. In 1998, the first sterile flies were released with the goal of creating a permanent barrier zone against New World screwworm fly invasions from South to Central America. In 2003 a screwworm production facility in Panama using the latest rearing techniques and improved strains has become the main facility that maintains the barrier zone at the Darien Gap between Central and South America. This is achieved through weekly sterile New World screwworm fly releases of up to 100 million insects. The insects are bred en masse in factories and sterilized by ionizing radiation.

The bred insects must not suffer any impairment in competition with wild, fertile insects. Researchers are investigating the possibilities and methods for producing genetically sterilized males.

=== United States ===
Screwworm flies were again found in southern Mexico in late 2024, and the United States was preparing to breed billions of sterile flies in Mexico and release them over Mexico and southern Texas in 2026 to protect the country against invasion. The USDA estimated in 2025 that an outbreak in Texas (the biggest cattle-producing US state) could cost US$1.8 billion. In September 2025, a case of New World screwworm was found in Sabinas Hidalgo, located in the state of Nuevo León, less than 70 miles (110 km) from the US-Mexico border. In May 2026, another case of New World screwworm was found in Coahuila, Mexico, this one within 31 miles (50 km) from the US-Mexico border. On June 3, 2026, the USDA confirmed a case of screwworm in Zavala County, Texas. On June 5, 2026, the USDA confirmed a second case in a one-month-old calf in Zavala County, Texas, approximately 5.6 miles away from the first confirmed detection. Three additional cases were confirmed on 8 June 2026. This came after DOGE cut a USAID program monitoring and containing screwworm in Central America, days before re-opening cattle imports from Mexico. Texas Agriculture Commissioner Sid Miller said cattle industry leaders and agriculture officials raised the alarm about these cuts for several months, but were ignored.

In October 2026, a hunter discovered New World screwworm in an elk harvested on a game ranch in Pecos County, Texas. It was the first confirmed case in U.S. wildlife and led to increased monitoring by the USDA and Texas Parks and Wildlife Department. Also in October 2026, the first confirmed case in Arizona was announced in Cochise County, Arizona. The confirmed case was found in a canine by a veterinarian. The Arizona Department of Agriculture (AZDA) is coordinating closely with the USDA to ensure the case is integrated into regional response efforts.
