= List of Bactrocera species =

This is a list of species of fruit flies (Tephritidae) in the genus Bactrocera, as of 2019.

- Bactrocera abbreviata (Hardy, 1974)
- Bactrocera abdofuscata (Drew, 1971)
- Bactrocera abdolonginqua (Drew, 1971)
- Bactrocera abdomininigra Drew, 1989
- Bactrocera abdonigella (Drew, 1866)
- Bactrocera aberrans (Hardy, 1951)
- Bactrocera abscondita (Drew & Hancock, 1981)
- Bactrocera absidata Drew, 1989
- Bactrocera abundans Drew, 1989
- Bactrocera aceraglans White & Evenhuis, 1999
- Bactrocera aceromata White & Evenhuis, 1999
- Bactrocera adamantea Leblanc & Doorenweerd, 2018
- Bactrocera aemula Drew, 1989
- Bactrocera aenigmatica (Malloch, 1931)
- Bactrocera aeroginosa (Drew & Hancock, 1981)
- Bactrocera aethriobasis (Hardy, 1973)
- Bactrocera affinibancroftii Drew & Romig, 2013
- Bactrocera affinidorsalis (Hardy, 1982)
- Bactrocera affinis (Hardy, 1954)
- Bactrocera aglaiae (Hardy, 1951)
- Bactrocera aithogaster Drew, 1989
- Bactrocera albistrigata (Meijere, 1911)
- Bactrocera allwoodi (Drew, 1979)
- Bactrocera alyxiae (May, 1953)
- Bactrocera amarambalensis Drew, 2002
- Bactrocera ampla (Drew, 1971)
- Bactrocera amplexa (Munro, 1984)
- Bactrocera amplexiseta (May, 1962)
- Bactrocera andamanensis (Kapoor, 1971)
- Bactrocera anfracta Drew, 1989
- Bactrocera angusticostata Drew, 1989
- Bactrocera angustifasciata Drew, 1989
- Bactrocera anomala (Drew, 1971)
- Bactrocera anthracina (Drew, 1971)
- Bactrocera antigone (Drew & Hancock, 1981)
- Bactrocera apicofuscans White & Tsuruta, 2001
- Bactrocera apiconigroscutella Drew, 2002
- Bactrocera apicopicta Drew & Romig, 2013
- Bactrocera aquila (Drew, 1989)
- Bactrocera aquilonis (May, 1965)
- Bactrocera arecae (Hardy & Adachi, 1954)
- Bactrocera assita Drew, 1989
- Bactrocera aterrima (Drew, 1972)
- Bactrocera atra (Malloch, 1938)
- Bactrocera atrabifasciata Drew & Romig, 2001
- Bactrocera atramentata (Hering, 1941)
- Bactrocera atrifemur Drew & Hancock, 1994
- Bactrocera atriliniellata Drew, 1989
- Bactrocera aurantiaca (Drew & Hancock, 1981)
- Bactrocera aurea (May, 1952)
- Bactrocera avittata Drew & Romig, 2013
- Bactrocera balagawii Drew, 2011
- Bactrocera bancroftii (Tryon, 1927)
- Bactrocera banneri White, 1999
- Bactrocera barringtoniae (Tryon, 1927)
- Bactrocera batemani Drew, 1989
- Bactrocera beckerae (Hardy, 1982)
- Bactrocera bellisi Drew & Romig, 2013
- Bactrocera bhutaniae Drew & Romig, 2013
- Bactrocera biarcuata (Walker, 1865)
- Bactrocera bidentata (May, 1963)
- Bactrocera bifasciata (Hardy, 1982)
- Bactrocera biguttata (Bezzi, 1922)
- Bactrocera bimaculata Drew & Hancock, 1994
- Bactrocera binhduongiae Drew & Romig, 2013
- Bactrocera bipustulata Bezzi, 1914
- Bactrocera bitungiae Drew & Romig, 2013
- Bactrocera bivittata Lin & Wang, 2005
- Bactrocera blairiae Drew & Romig, 2013
- Bactrocera brachycera (Bezzi, 1916)
- Bactrocera breviaculeus (Hardy, 1951)
- Bactrocera brevistriata (Drew, 1968)
- Bactrocera bruneiae Drew & Romig, 2013
- Bactrocera brunnea (Perkins & May, 1949)
- Bactrocera brunneola White & Tsuruta, 2001
- Bactrocera bryoniae (Tryon, 1927)
- Bactrocera buinensis Drew, 1989
- Bactrocera bullata Drew, 1989
- Bactrocera bullifera (Hardy, 1973)
- Bactrocera buloloensis Drew, 1989
- Bactrocera cacuminata (Hering, 1941)
- Bactrocera caledoniensis Drew, 1989
- Bactrocera caliginosa (Hardy, 1970)
- Bactrocera calophylli (Perkins & May, 1949)
- Bactrocera captiva Drew & Romig, 2013
- Bactrocera carambolae Drew & Hancock, 1994
- Bactrocera carbonaria (Hendel, 1927)
- Bactrocera careofascia Drew & Romig, 2013
- Bactrocera caryeae (Kapoor, 1971)
- Bactrocera ceylanica Tsuruta & White, 2001
- Bactrocera cheesmanae (Perkins, 1939)
- Bactrocera chettalli David & Ranganath, 2016
- Bactrocera cibodasae Drew & Hancock, 1994
- Bactrocera cinnabaria Drew & Romig, 2013
- Bactrocera cinnamea Drew, 1989
- Bactrocera circamusae Drew, 1989
- Bactrocera citima (Hardy, 1973)
- Bactrocera clarifemur Leblanc & Doorenweerd, 2018
- Bactrocera cogani White 2006
- Bactrocera cognata (Hardy & Adachi, 1954)
- Bactrocera collita Drew & Hancock, 1994
- Bactrocera commensurata Drew & Romig, 2013
- Bactrocera commina Drew, 1989
- Bactrocera confluens (Drew, 1971)
- Bactrocera congener Drew, 1989
- Bactrocera connecta Leblanc & Doorenweerd, 2018
- Bactrocera consectorata Drew, 1989
- Bactrocera contermina Drew, 1989
- Bactrocera contigua Drew, 1989
- Bactrocera continua (Bezzi, 1919)
- Bactrocera coracina (Drew, 1971)
- Bactrocera correcta (Bezzi, 1916)
- Bactrocera costalis (Shiraki, 1933)
- Bactrocera curreyi Drew, 1989
- Bactrocera curtivitta Drew & Romig, 2013
- Bactrocera curvifer (Walker, 1864)
- Bactrocera curvipennis (Froggatt, 1909)
- Bactrocera curvosterna Drew & Romig, 2013
- Bactrocera dapsiles Drew, 1989
- Bactrocera daruensis Drew, 1989
- Bactrocera decumana (Drew, 1972)
- Bactrocera decurtans (May, 1965)
- Bactrocera diallagma Drew, 1989
- Bactrocera diaphana (Hering, 1953)
- Bactrocera digressa Radhakrishnan, 1999
- Bactrocera diospyri Drew, 1989
- Bactrocera dispar (Hardy, 1982)
- Bactrocera dongnaiae Drew & Romig, 2013
- Bactrocera dorsalis (Hendel, 1912)
- Bactrocera dorsaloides (Hardy & Adachi, 1954)
- Bactrocera dyscrita (Drew, 1971)
- Bactrocera ebenea (Drew, 1971)
- Bactrocera ektoalangiae Drew & Hancock, 1999
- Bactrocera elongata Drew & Romig, 2013
- Bactrocera endiandrae (Perkins & May, 1949)
- Bactrocera enochra (Drew, 1972)
- Bactrocera epicharis (Hardy, 1970)
- Bactrocera ernesti Leblanc & Doorenweerd, 2018
- Bactrocera erubescentis (Drew & Hancock, 1981)
- Bactrocera eurycosta Drew & Romig, 2013
- Bactrocera exigua (May, 1958)
- Bactrocera eximia Drew, 1989
- Bactrocera expandens (Walker, 1859)
- Bactrocera exspoliata (Hering, 1941)
- Bactrocera facialis (Coquillett, 1909)
- Bactrocera fagraea (Tryon, 1927)
- Bactrocera fastigata Tsuruta & White, 2001
- Bactrocera fergussoniensis Drew, 1989
- Bactrocera fernandoi Tsuruta & White, 2001
- Bactrocera finitima Drew, 1989
- Bactrocera flavinotus (May, 1957)
- Bactrocera flavipennis (Hardy, 1982)
- Bactrocera flavoscutellata Lin & Wang, 2005
- Bactrocera flavosterna Drew & Romig, 2013
- Bactrocera floresiae Drew & Hancock, 1994
- Bactrocera frauenfeldi (Schiner, 1868)
- Bactrocera froggatti (Bezzi, 1928)
- Bactrocera fuliginus (Drew & Hancock, 1981)
- Bactrocera fulvicauda (Perkins, 1939)
- Bactrocera fulvifacies (Perkins, 1939)
- Bactrocera fulvifemur Drew & Hancock, 1994
- Bactrocera fulvoabdominalis White & Evenhuis, 1999
- Bactrocera fulvosterna Drew & Romig 2013
- Bactrocera furcata David & Hancock 2017
- Bactrocera furfurosa Drew, 1989
- Bactrocera furvescens Drew, 1989
- Bactrocera furvilineata Drew, 1989
- Bactrocera fuscalata Drew, 1989
- Bactrocera fuscitibia Drew & Hancock, 1994
- Bactrocera fuscoformosa Drew & Romig, 2013
- Bactrocera fuscohumeralis White & Evenhuis, 1999
- Bactrocera fuscolobata Drew & Romig, 2013
- Bactrocera fuscoptera Drew & Romig, 2013
- Bactrocera garciniae Bezzi, 1913
- Bactrocera gnetum Drew & Hancock, 1995
- Bactrocera gombokensis Drew & Hancock, 1994
- Bactrocera grandifasciata White & Evenhuis, 1999
- Bactrocera grandistylus Drew & Hancock, 1995
- Bactrocera halfordiae (Tryon, 1927)
- Bactrocera halmaherae Drew & Romig, 2013
- Bactrocera hantanae Tsuruta & White, 2001
- Bactrocera harrietensis Ramani & David, 2016
- Bactrocera hastigerina (Hardy, 1954)
- Bactrocera hispidula (May, 1958)
- Bactrocera hollingsworthi Drew & Romig, 2001
- Bactrocera holtmanni (Hardy, 1974)
- Bactrocera humilis (Drew & Hancock, 1981)
- Bactrocera hyalina (Shiraki, 1933)
- Bactrocera hypomelaina Drew, 1989
- Bactrocera icelus (Hardy, 1974)
- Bactrocera illusioscutellaris Drew & Romig, 2013
- Bactrocera impunctata (de Mejeire, 1914)
- Bactrocera incompta Drew & Romig, 2013
- Bactrocera inconspicua Drew & Romig, 2013
- Bactrocera inconstans Drew, 1989
- Bactrocera indecora (Drew, 1971)
- Bactrocera indonesiae Drew & Hancock, 1994
- Bactrocera infulata Drew & Hancock, 1994
- Bactrocera invisitata Drew, 1989
- Bactrocera involuta (Hardy, 1982)
- Bactrocera irvingiae Drew & Hancock, 1994
- Bactrocera ismayi Drew, 1989
- Bactrocera jaceobancroftii Drew & Romig 2013
- Bactrocera jarvisi (Tryon, 1927)
- Bactrocera kalimantaniae Drew & Romig, 2013
- Bactrocera kanchanaburi Drew & Hancock, 1994
- Bactrocera kandiensis (Drew & Hancock, 1994)
- Bactrocera kelaena Drew, 1989
- Bactrocera kinabalu Drew & Hancock, 1994
- Bactrocera kirki (Froggatt, 1910)
- Bactrocera kohkongiae Leblanc, 2015
- Bactrocera kraussi (Hardy, 1951)
- Bactrocera kuniyoshii (Shiraki, 1968)
- Bactrocera laithieuiae Drew & Romig, 2013
- Bactrocera lampabilis (Drew, 1971)
- Bactrocera lata (Perkins, 1938)
- Bactrocera lateritaenia Drew & Hancock, 1994
- Bactrocera laticaudus (Hardy 1950)
- Bactrocera laticosta Drew, 1989
- Bactrocera latifrons (Hendel, 1915) - In 2016 found in Burundi, quickly investigated across the country, and found to have already spread to the entire country and possibly soon its neighbors.
- Bactrocera latilineata Drew, 1989
- Bactrocera latilineola Drew & Hancock, 1994
- Bactrocera latissima Drew, 1989
- Bactrocera limbifera (Bezzi, 1919)
- Bactrocera linduensis Drew & Romig, 2013
- Bactrocera lineata (Perkins, 1939)
- Bactrocera lombokensis Drew & Hancock, 1994
- Bactrocera longicornis Macquart, 1835
- Bactrocera lucida (Munro, 1939)
- Bactrocera luteola (Malloch, 1931)
- Bactrocera maculigera Doleschall, 1858
- Bactrocera makilingensis Drew & Hancock, 1994
- Bactrocera malaysiensis Drew & Hancock, 1994
- Bactrocera mamaliae Drew & Romig, 2013
- Bactrocera manskii (Perkins & May, 1949)
- Bactrocera matsumurai (Shiraki, 1933)
- Bactrocera mayi (Hardy, 1951)
- Bactrocera mcgregori (Bezzi, 1919)
- Bactrocera mediorufula Drew & Romig, 2013
- Bactrocera megaspilus (Hardy, 1982)
- Bactrocera melania (Hardy & Adachi, 1954)
- Bactrocera melanogaster Drew, 1989
- Bactrocera melanoscutata Drew, 1989
- Bactrocera melanothoracica Drew, 1989
- Bactrocera melanotus (Coquillett, 1909)
- Bactrocera melas (Perkins & May, 1949)
- Bactrocera melastomatos Drew & Hancock, 1994
- Bactrocera memnonia (Drew, 1989)
- Bactrocera menanus (Munro, 1984)
- Bactrocera mendosa (May, 1958)
- Bactrocera merapiensis Drew & Hancock, 1994
- Bactrocera mesomelas (Bezzi, 1908)
- Bactrocera mesonotochra Drew, 1989
- Bactrocera mimulus Drew, 1989
- Bactrocera minax (Enderlein, 1920)
- Bactrocera miniscula Drew & Hancock, 1994
- Bactrocera minuta (Drew, 1971)
- Bactrocera moluccensis (Perkins, 1939)
- Bactrocera montyanus (Munro, 1984)
- Bactrocera morobiensis Drew, 1989
- Bactrocera morula Drew, 1989
- Bactrocera mucronis (Drew, 1971)
- Bactrocera muiri (Hardy & Adachi, 1954)
- Bactrocera munroi (White, 1957)
- Bactrocera murrayi (Perkins, 1939)
- Bactrocera musae (Tryon, 1909)
- Bactrocera mutabilis (May, 1952)
- Bactrocera nanoarcuata Drew & Romig, 2013
- Bactrocera nationigrotibialis Drew & Romig, 2013
- Bactrocera naucleae Drew & Romig, 2001
- Bactrocera neoarecae Drew, 2002
- Bactrocera neocheesmanae Drew, 1989
- Bactrocera neocongnata Drew & Hancock, 1994
- Bactrocera neofulvicauda Drew & Romig, 2013
- Bactrocera neohumeralis (Hardy, 1951)
- Bactrocera neonigrita (Drew, 1989)
- Bactrocera neonigrotibialis Drew 2002
- Bactrocera neopropinqua Drew & Hancock, 1994
- Bactrocera neoritsemai Drew & Romig 2013
- Bactrocera neoxanthodes Drew & Romig, 2001
- Bactrocera nesiotes (Munro, 1984)
- Bactrocera nigella (Drew, 1968)
- Bactrocera nigra (Tryon, 1927)
- Bactrocera nigrescens (Drew, 1968)
- Bactrocera nigrescentis (Drew, 1971)
- Bactrocera nigricula (Drew, 1989)
- Bactrocera nigrifacia Zhang Ji & Chen, 2011
- Bactrocera nigrifemorata Li & Wang, 2011
- Bactrocera nigrita (Hardy, 1955)
- Bactrocera nigrivenata (Munro, 1937)
- Bactrocera nigrofemoralis White & Tsuruta, 2001
- Bactrocera nigroscutata White & Evenhuis, 1999
- Bactrocera nigrotibialis (Perkins, 1938)
- Bactrocera nigrovittata Drew, 1989
- Bactrocera notatagena (May, 1953)
- Bactrocera nothaphoebe Drew & Romig, 2013
- Bactrocera obfuscata Drew, 1989
- Bactrocera oblineata Drew, 1989
- Bactrocera obliqua (Malloch, 1939)
- Bactrocera obliquivenosa Drew & Romig, 2001
- Bactrocera obscura (Malloch, 1931)
- Bactrocera obscurata (de Mejeire, 1911)
- Bactrocera obscurivitta Drew & Romig, 2013
- Bactrocera occipitalis (Bezzi, 1919)
- Bactrocera ochracea Drew, 1989
- Bactrocera ochroma Drew & Romig, 2013
- Bactrocera ochromarginis (Drew, 1971)
- Bactrocera ochrosiae (Malloch, 1942)
- Bactrocera ochroventer Drew & Romig, 2013
- Bactrocera oleae (Rossi, 1790)
- Bactrocera opacovitta Drew & Romig, 2013
- Bactrocera opiliae (Drew & Hardy, 1981)
- Bactrocera osbeckiae Drew & Hancock, 1994
- Bactrocera pacificae Drew & Romig, 2001
- Bactrocera pagdeni (Malloch, 1939)
- Bactrocera pallescentis (Hardy, 1955)
- Bactrocera pallida (Perkins & May, 1949)
- Bactrocera paraarecae Drew & Romig, 2013
- Bactrocera parabancroftii Drew, 2011
- Bactrocera parabarringtoniae Drew & Hancock, 1999
- Bactrocera paradiospyri Chen Zhou & Li, 2011
- Bactrocera parafrauenfeldi Drew, 1989
- Bactrocera parafroggatti Drew & Romig, 2001
- Bactrocera paralatissima Drew & Romig, 2013
- Bactrocera paralimbifera Drew & Romig, 2013
- Bactrocera paramusae Drew, 1989
- Bactrocera paranigrita Drew & Romig, 2013
- Bactrocera paraosbeckiae Drew 2002
- Bactrocera paraverbascifoliae Drew, 2002
- Bactrocera paraxanthodes Drew & Hancock, 1995
- Bactrocera parvula (Hendel, 1912)
- Bactrocera passiflorae (Froggatt, 1910)
- Bactrocera patula Drew & Romig, 2013
- Bactrocera pectoralis (Walker, 1859)
- Bactrocera pedestris (Bezzi, 1913)
- Bactrocera pendleburyi (Perkins, 1938)
- Bactrocera peneallwoodi Drew & Romig, 2013
- Bactrocera penebeckerae Drew & Romig, 2013
- Bactrocera penecognata Drew & Hancock, 1994
- Bactrocera penecorrecta Drew, 2002
- Bactrocera penecostalis Drew & Romig, 2013
- Bactrocera penefurva Drew, 1989
- Bactrocera peneobscura Drew & Romig, 2001
- Bactrocera penephaea Drew & Romig, 2013
- Bactrocera peninsularis (Drew & Hancock, 1981)
- Bactrocera pepisalae (Froggatt, 1910)
- Bactrocera perfusca (Aubertin, 1929)
- Bactrocera perigrapha White & Tsuruta, 2001
- Bactrocera perkinsi (Drew & Hancock, 1981)
- Bactrocera pernigra Ito, 1983
- Bactrocera peterseni (Hardy, 1970)
- Bactrocera petila Drew, 1989
- Bactrocera phaea (Drew, 1971)
- Bactrocera phaleriae (May, 1956)
- Bactrocera picea (Drew, 1972)
- Bactrocera pictipennis Lin & Zeng 2011
- Bactrocera pisinna Drew, 1989
- Bactrocera popondettiensis Drew, 1989
- Bactrocera profunda Tsuruta & White, 2001
- Bactrocera prolixa Drew, 1989
- Bactrocera propedistincta Drew, 1989
- Bactrocera propinqua (Hardy & Adachi, 1954)
- Bactrocera pruniae Drew & Romig, 2013
- Bactrocera pseudobeckerae Drew & Romig, 2013
- Bactrocera pseudocucurbitae (White, 1999)
- Bactrocera pseudodistincta (Drew, 1971)
- Bactrocera pseudoversicolor Drew, 2002
- Bactrocera psidii (Froggatt, 1899)
- Bactrocera pulchra Tryon, 1927
- Bactrocera pusilla (Hardy, 1983)
- Bactrocera pyrifoliae Drew & Hancock, 1994
- Bactrocera quadrata (May, 1963)
- Bactrocera quadrisetosa (Bezzi, 1928)
- Bactrocera quasiinfulata Drew & Romig, 2013
- Bactrocera quasineonigrita Drew & Romig, 2013
- Bactrocera quasipropinqua Drew & Hancock, 1994
- Bactrocera quasisilvicola Drew, 1989
- Bactrocera raiensis Drew & Hancock, 1994
- Bactrocera ramuensis Drew, 2011
- Bactrocera ranganathi Drew & Romig, 2013
- Bactrocera reclinata Drew, 1989
- Bactrocera recurrens (Hering, 1941)
- Bactrocera redunca (Drew, 1971)
- Bactrocera repanda Drew, 1989
- Bactrocera resima (Drew, 1971)
- Bactrocera retrorsa Drew, 1989
- Bactrocera rhabdota Drew, 1989
- Bactrocera ritsemai (Weyenbergh, 1869)
- Bactrocera robertsi Drew, 1989
- Bactrocera robiginosa (May, 1958)
- Bactrocera romigae (Drew & Hancock, 1981)
- Bactrocera rubigina (Wang & Zhao, 1989)
- Bactrocera rufescens (May, 1967)
- Bactrocera rufivitta Drew 2011
- Bactrocera rufofuscula (Drew & Hancock, 1981)
- Bactrocera russeola (Drew & Hancock, 1981)
- Bactrocera rutengiae Drew & Romig, 2013
- Bactrocera rutila (Hering, 1941)
- Bactrocera samoae Drew, 1989
- Bactrocera sapaensis Drew & Romig, 2013
- Bactrocera satanellus (Hering, 1941)
- Bactrocera seguyi (Hering, 1939)
- Bactrocera selenophora Tsuruta & White, 2001
- Bactrocera sembaliensis Drew & Hancock, 1994
- Bactrocera setinervis (Malloch, 1938)
- Bactrocera silvicola (May, 1962)
- Bactrocera simulata (Malloch, 1939)
- Bactrocera speculifer (Walker, 1865)
- Bactrocera speewahensis Fay & Hancock, 2006
- Bactrocera splendida (Perkins, 1938)
- Bactrocera strigata (Perkins, 1934)
- Bactrocera sulawesiae Drew & Hancock, 1994
- Bactrocera suliae Drew & Romig, 2013
- Bactrocera sumbawaensis Drew & Hancock, 1994
- Bactrocera superba Drew & Romig, 2013
- Bactrocera symplocos Drew & Romig, 2013
- Bactrocera syzygii White & Tsuruta, 2001
- Bactrocera ttapahensis Drew & Romig, 2013
- Bactrocera tenuifascia (May, 1965)
- Bactrocera terminaliae Drew, 1989
- Bactrocera terminifer (Walker, 1860)
- Bactrocera ternatiae Drew & Romig, 2013
- Bactrocera tetrachaeta (Bezzi, 1919)
- Bactrocera thailandica Drew & Hancock, 1994
- Bactrocera thistletoni Drew, 1989
- Bactrocera tigrina (May, 1953)
- Bactrocera tillyardi (Perkins, 1938)
- Bactrocera tinomiscii Drew, 1989
- Bactrocera torresiae Huxam & Hancock, 2006
- Bactrocera tortuosa White & Evenhuis, 1999
- Bactrocera toxopeusi (Hering, 1953)
- Bactrocera trifaria (Drew, 1971)
- Bactrocera trifasciata (Hardy, 1982)
- Bactrocera trilineola Drew, 1989
- Bactrocera trilobata Drew & Hancock, 2016
- Bactrocera trivialis (Drew, 1971)
- Bactrocera truncata Drew & Romig, 2013
- Bactrocera tryoni (Froggatt, 1897)
- Bactrocera tsuneonis (Miyake, 1919)
- Bactrocera tuberculata (Bezzi, 1916)
- Bactrocera turneri Drew, 1989
- Bactrocera umbrosa (Fabricius, 1805)
- Bactrocera unifasciata (Malloch, 1939)
- Bactrocera unilineata Drew, 1989
- Bactrocera unimacula Drew & Hancock, 1994
- Bactrocera unipunctata (Malloch, 1939)
- Bactrocera unistriata (Drew, 1971)
- Bactrocera unitaeniola Drew & Romig, 2001
- Bactrocera usitata Drew & Hancock, 1994
- Bactrocera ustulata Drew, 1989
- Bactrocera uvariae Drew, 2011
- Bactrocera venefica (Hering, 1938)
- Bactrocera verbascifoliae Drew & Hancock, 1994
- Bactrocera versicolor (Bezzi, 1916)
- Bactrocera visenda (Hardy, 1951)
- Bactrocera vishnu Drew & Hancock, 1994
- Bactrocera vulgaris (Drew, 1971)
- Bactrocera waaiae Drew & Romig, 2013
- Bactrocera wanangiae Drew & Hancock, 2016
- Bactrocera warisensis White & Evenhuis, 1999
- Bactrocera wuzhishana Li & Wang, 2006
- Bactrocera xanthodes (Broun, 1904)
- Bactrocera yayeyamana (Matsumara, 1916)
- Bactrocera yorkensis Drew & Hancock, 1999
- Bactrocera zonata (Saunders, 1842)
