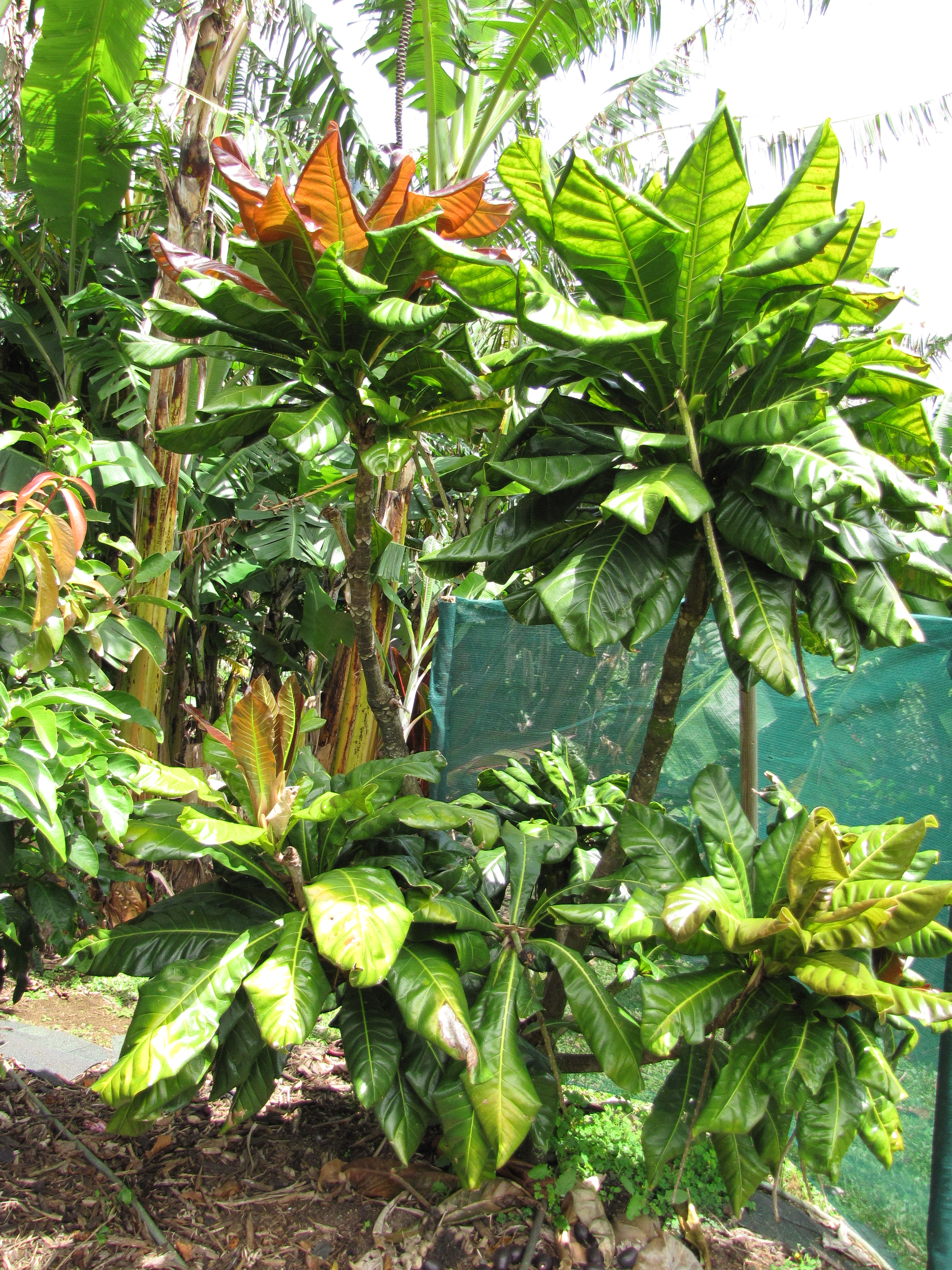

Scientific classification
- Kingdom: Plantae
- Clade: Tracheophytes
- Clade: Angiosperms
- Clade: Eudicots
- Clade: Asterids
- Order: Ericales
- Family: Lecythidaceae
- Genus: Barringtonia
- Species: B. edulis

Binomial name
- Barringtonia edulis Seem., 1866

Synonyms
- Butonica edulis (Seem.) Miers; Huttum edule (Seem.) Britten

= Barringtonia edulis =

Species of plant

Barringtonia edulis is a species of tree with edible fruits from the southwestern Pacific region, being found on Fiji and Vanuatu. Common names include cut nut, pao nut, boxfruit tree, heart tree, and yum-yum tree. It was first described in 1866 by Berthold Carl Seeman.

In Fiji, it is known as vutu (term also used for Barringtonia asiatica), vutukala, kutuvala and vana.

== Description ==
Barringtonia edulis is a little-branched evergreen tree growing to a height of about 18 m (60 ft). The trunk is up to 40 cm (16 in) in diameter and has smooth, greyish-brown bark. The large, glossy green leaves grow in clusters at the ends of the branches. They have short petioles and are up to 45 cm (18 in) long and 18 cm (7 in) broad. The leaf blades are simple, oblong-elliptical and entire, with slightly undulating margins, prominent veins and acute apexes.

The inflorescence is a terminal, dangling raceme up to 80 cm (30 in) long. The central rachis bears a spiral arrangement of small, closely-packed tubular flowers with globose, reddish-brown calyces tipped by two to four red lobes, four squarish white petals, a projecting boss of stamens and a single, long style. The fruits are oblong berries with persistent calyces, up to 10 cm (4 in) long, with densely matted short hairs, greyish-green, becoming reddish or purplish as they ripen.

== Distribution and habitat ==
Barringtonia edulis is endemic to Fiji and Vanuatu. It grows in humid forests near the coast, at altitudes below 400 m (1,300 ft). It also occurs beside roads and footpaths and near habitations, and is cultivated in gardens for its attractive glossy foliage and edible fruits.

== Ecology ==
The flowers of Barringtonia edulis are pollinated by moths and bats. The tree is host to several species of fruit fly including the oriental fruit fly (Bactrocera dorsalis), the Pacific fruit fly (Bactrocera xanthodes), and the Fijian fruit fly (Bactrocera passiflorae).

== Uses ==
The fruits are eaten, raw or cooked, but are said to be insipid. The seeds are also edible, the flavour resembling peanuts. The bark is used in traditional medicine, to treat stomach problems and gonorrhoea, and to induce an abortion. The wood is light and makes fast-burning firewood. The timber is used for light construction, casing and for making canoe paddles.

== Images ==
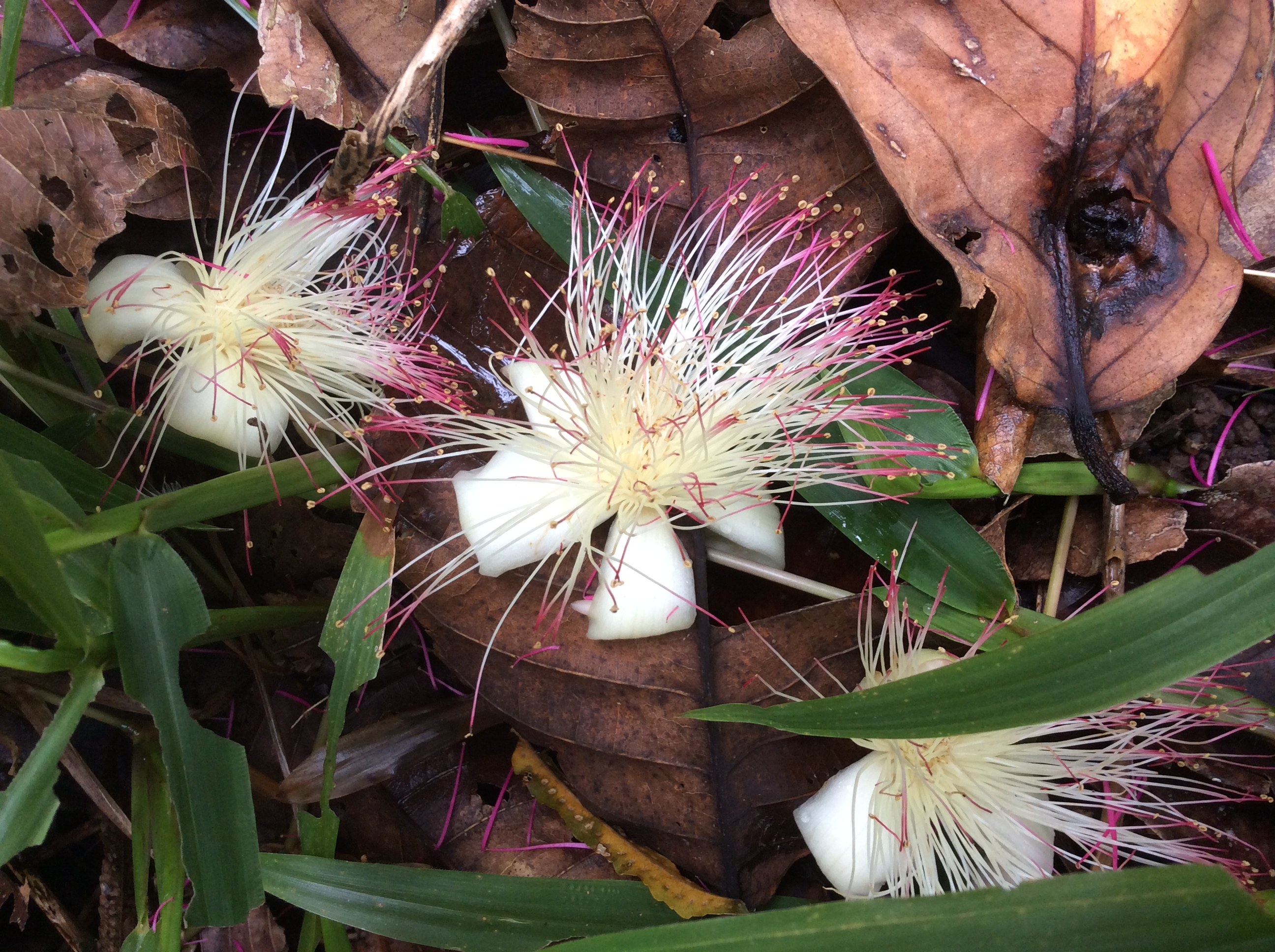

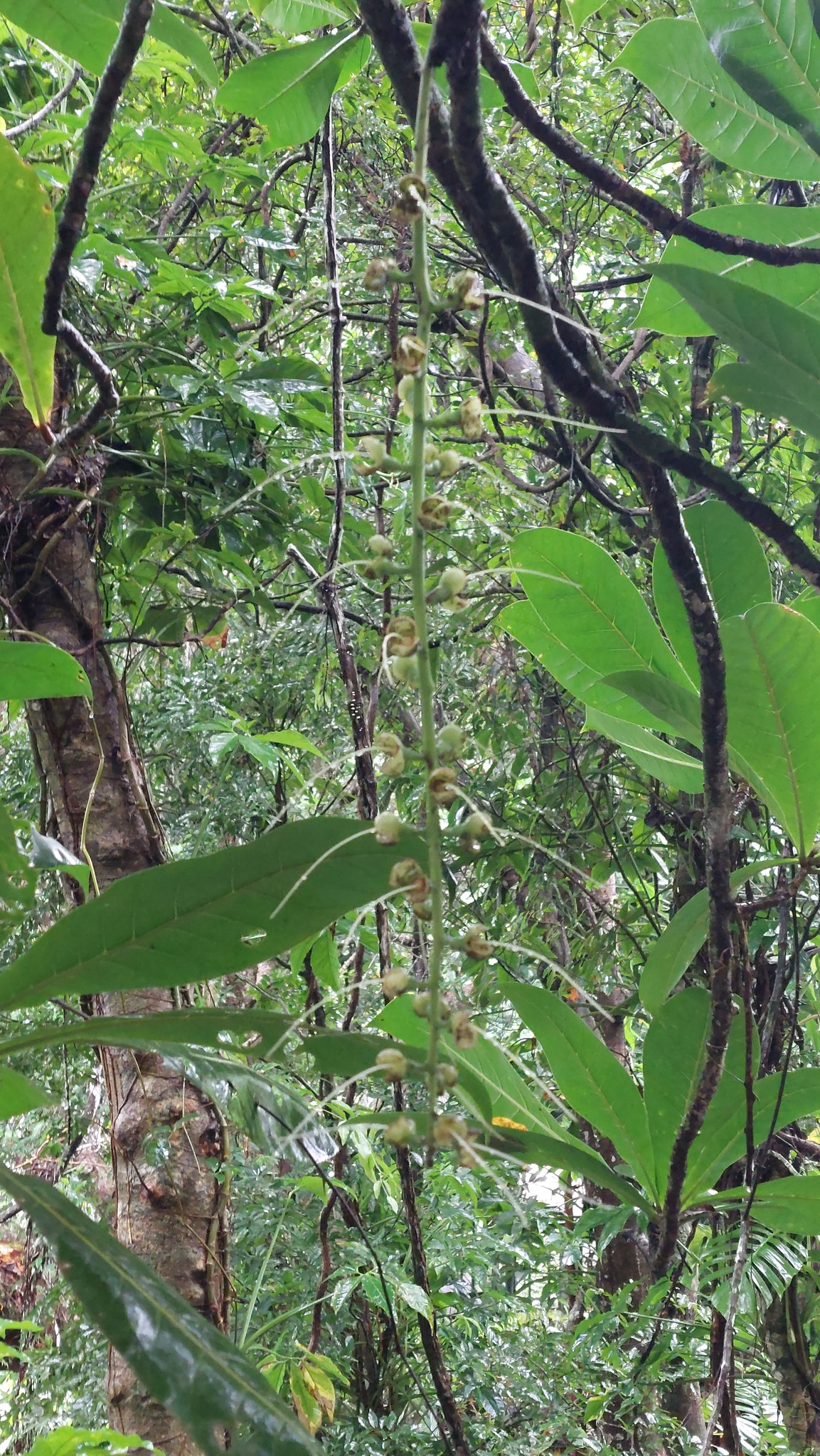

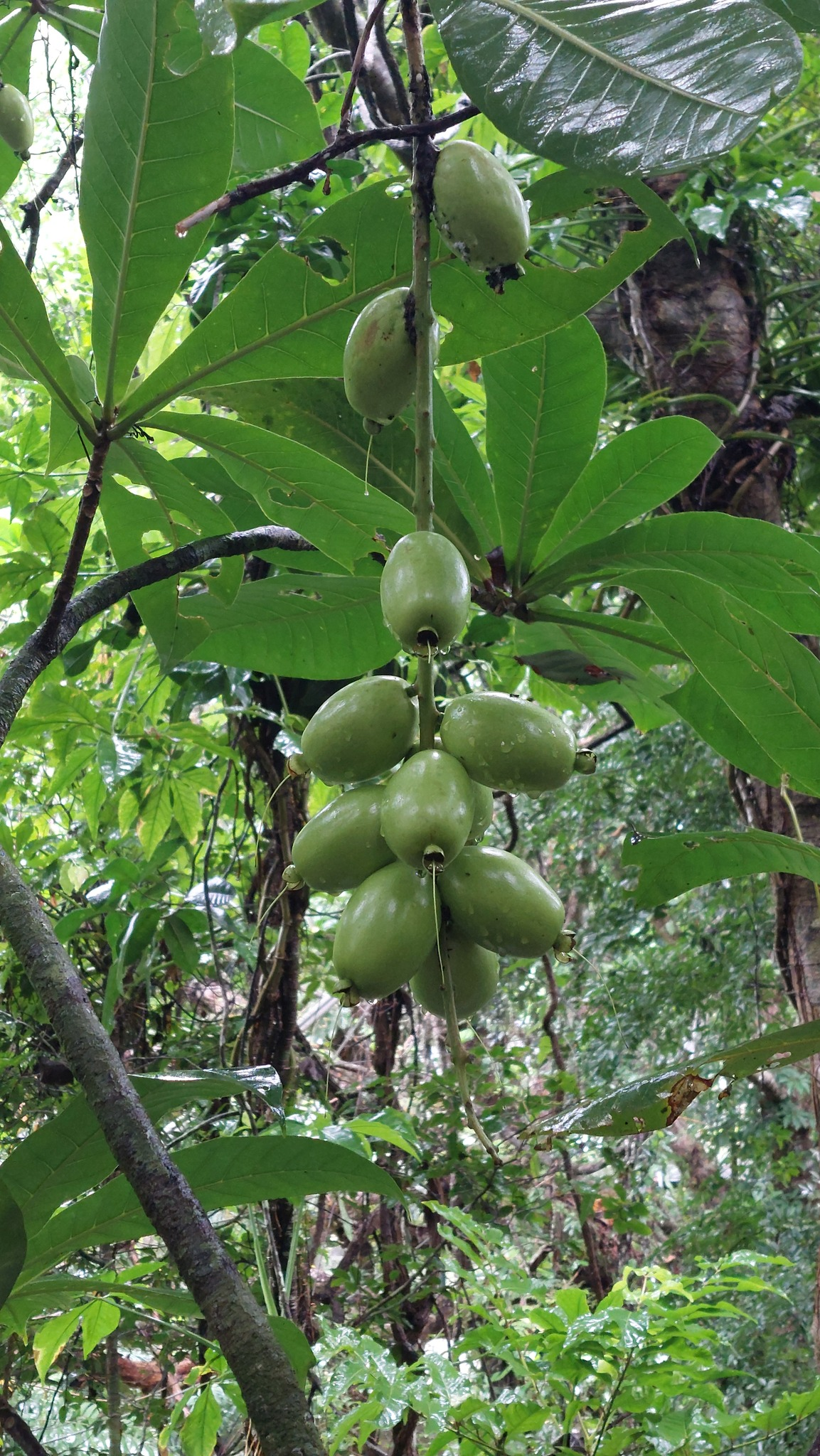
