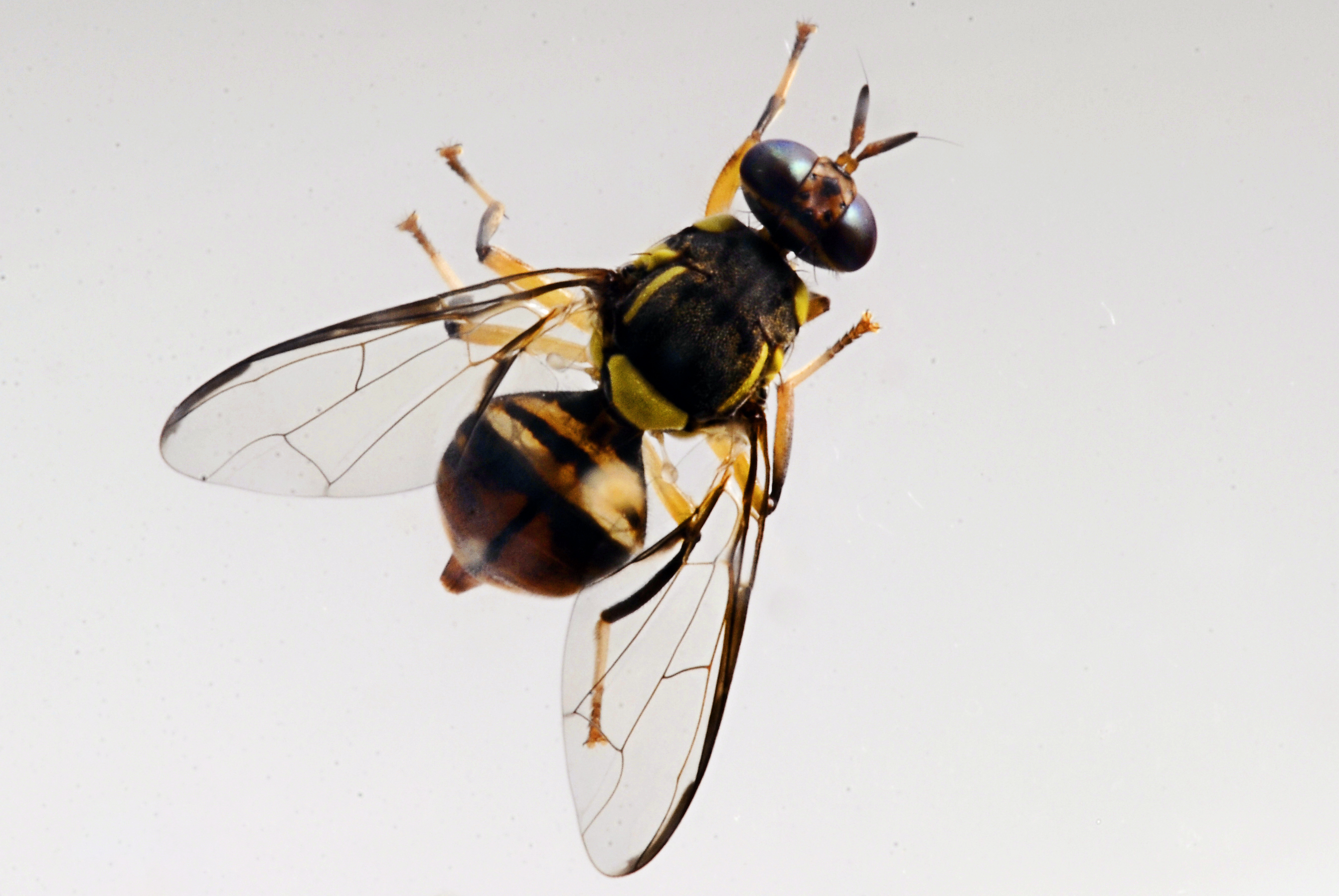

Scientific classification
- Kingdom: Animalia
- Phylum: Arthropoda
- Clade: Pancrustacea
- Class: Insecta
- Order: Diptera
- Family: Tephritidae
- Genus: Bactrocera
- Species: B. carambolae

Binomial name
- Bactrocera carambolae Drew & Hancock, 1994

= Bactrocera carambolae =

Carambola fruit fly

Species of fly

Bactrocera carambolae, also known as the carambola fruit fly, is a fruit fly species in the family Tephritidae, and is native to Asia. This species was described by Drew and Hancock in 1994.

Bactrocera carambolae are specifically native to Malaysia, southern Thailand and western Indonesia. In past years, this species has invaded South America via the trade of fruits from Indonesia. This species is known as a major exotic pest, labelled as high priority in the Tropical Fruit Industry Biosecurity Plan and a quarantine pest in Brazil.

== Identification ==
=== Phylogeny ===
Bactrocera carambolae is a member of the Oriental fruit fly Bactrocera dorsalis species complex and are genetically similar except for slight differences in nuclear and mitochondrial DNA. From DNA analyses it was determined that B. carambolae forms a reciprocally monophyletic sister group to a larger clade containing the B. dorsalis species complex.

=== Morphology ===
Bactrocera carambolae can be difficult to distinguish from other B. dorsalis complex species. This species is generally characterized by a predominantly black thorax, while featuring abdominal segments with brown lateral posterior markings and a medial longitudinal black band over all three tergum. This species also features a yellow scutellum; triangle shaped portion of exoskeleton located between the base of the wings. In addition to other Diptera, this species has one pair of membranous wings, with hind wings reduced to knob-like structures. The head of this species is reddish brown with one pair of oval, black compound eyes, and sucking/piercing mouthparts. This species can reach a length of 6 to 8 mm (0.6 cm to 0.8 cm).

Female B. carambolae can be differentiated from male B. carambolae by observation of longer abdomens, and an ovipositor on the posterior end of the abdominal segments, where as males have shorter abdomens and a more rounded tip of their abdominal segments. Compared to other members of the B. dorsalis complex, B. carambolae have shorter male reproductive organs, known as aedeagi, and broader costal bands on their wings.

== Lifecycle ==
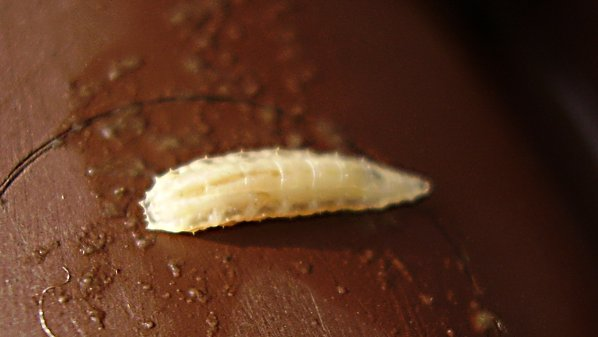
Larva

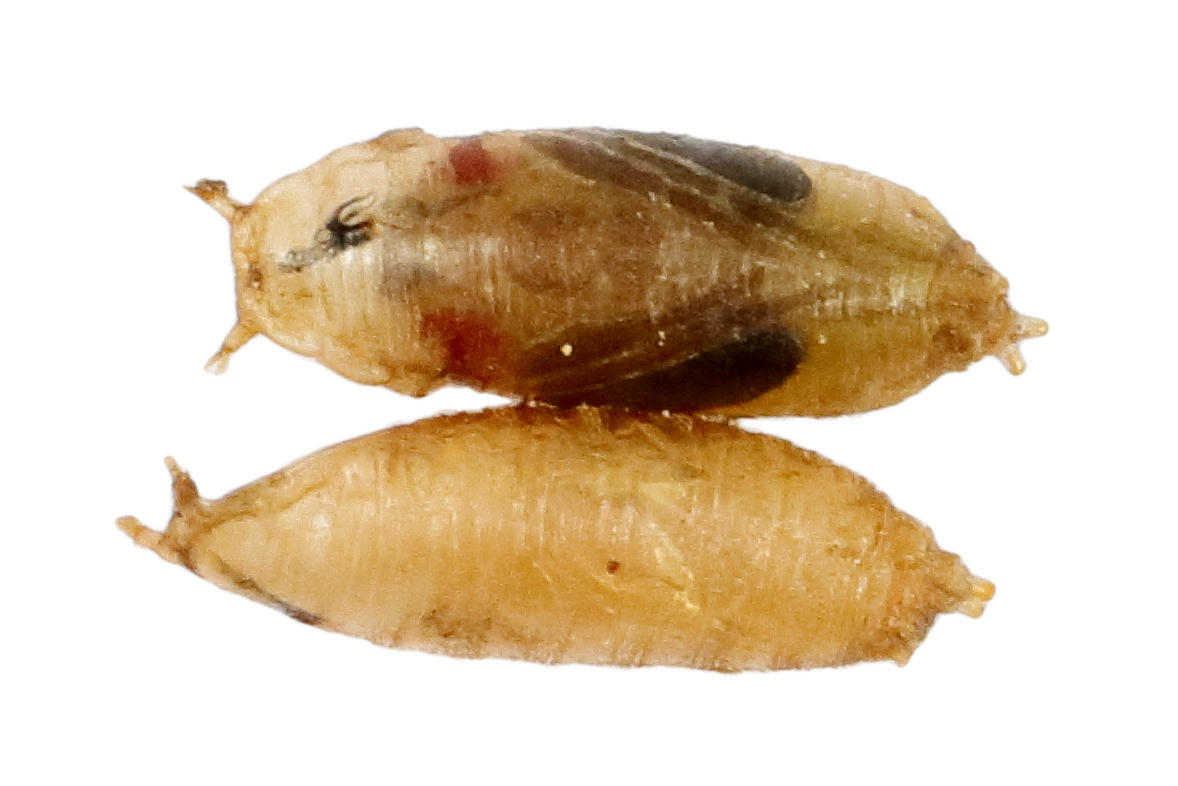
Pupae

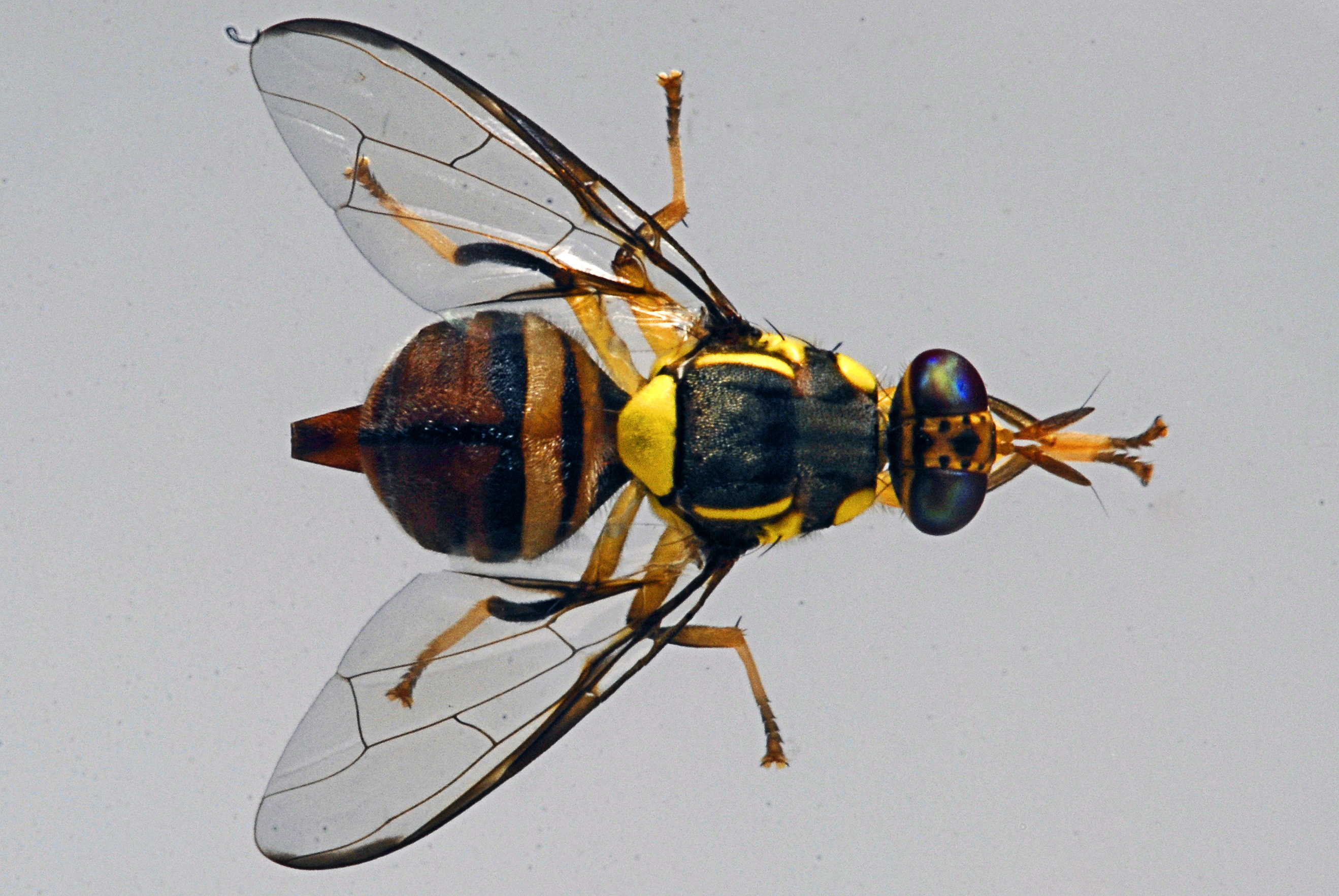
Adult

Bactrocera carambolae are a polyphagous species which infects over 100 different host plants, including avocado, guava, mango, papaya and orange, among several others. The adult female B. carambolae lays her eggs under the skin of host fruits, which take a maximum of two days to hatch. Once the larvae hatch, they immediately begin feeding on the fruit. Following seven to ten days, the fruit matures and falls to the ground below, where the larvae pupates into the soil; emerging approximately one week later. The adult flies take approximately three weeks to fully mature, making the full life cycle last roughly 35 days. The development rate of immature stages of B. carambolae increases with increased temperature.

=== Symbiotic relationships ===
Different bacterial communities are associated with different developmental stages of B. carambolae, and includes four major phyla; Actinomycetota, Bacteroidota, Bacillota and Pseudomonadota. Proteobacteria are dominantly present in every life stage, and Bacteroidetes are at largest in the larval and pupal stages. The large abundance of Proteobacteria are essential in the act of courtship and reproduction of not only B. carambolae, but Bactrocera fruit flies in general.

== Behaviour ==
=== Feeding ===
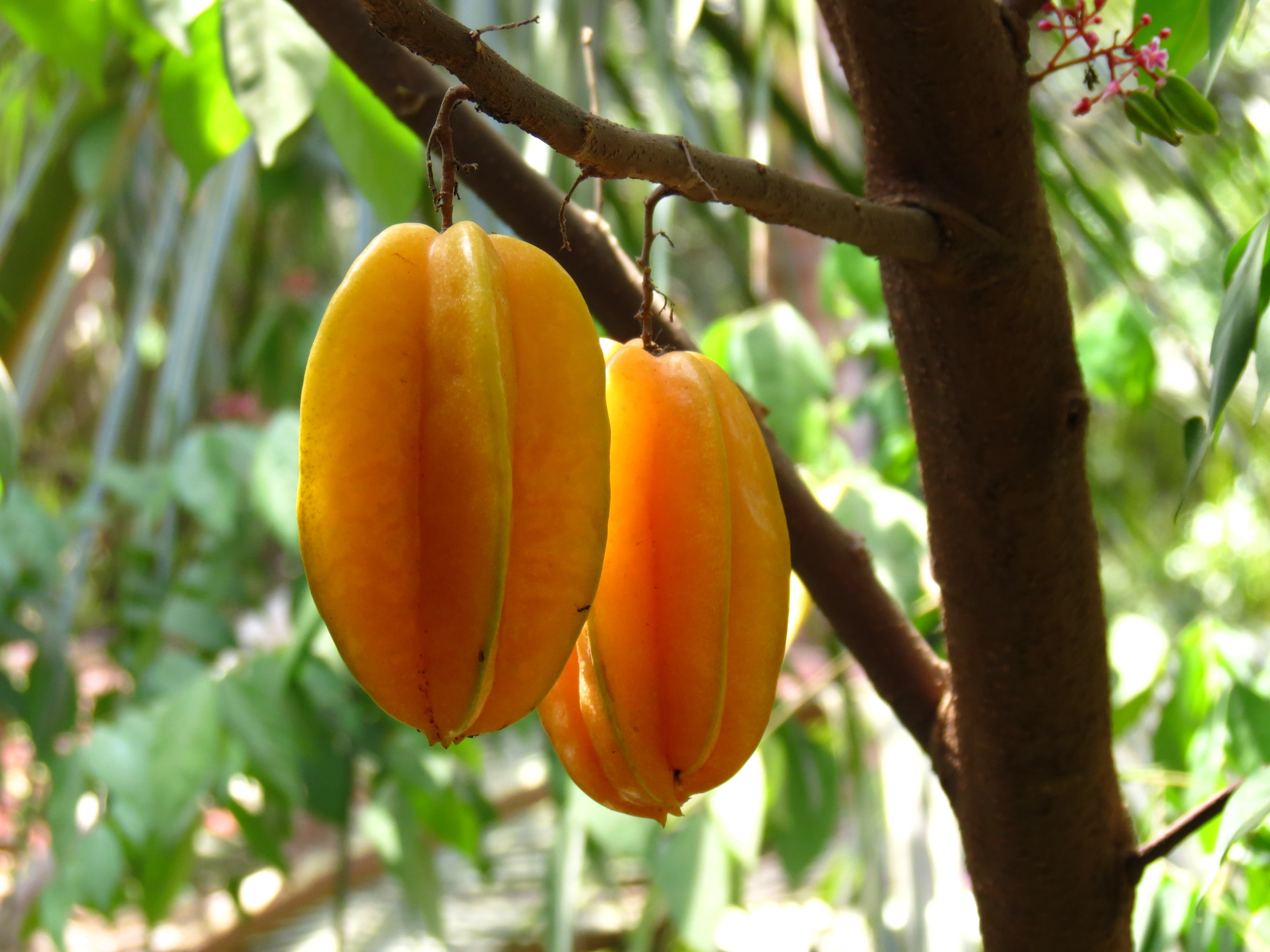
Carambola fruit without infestation

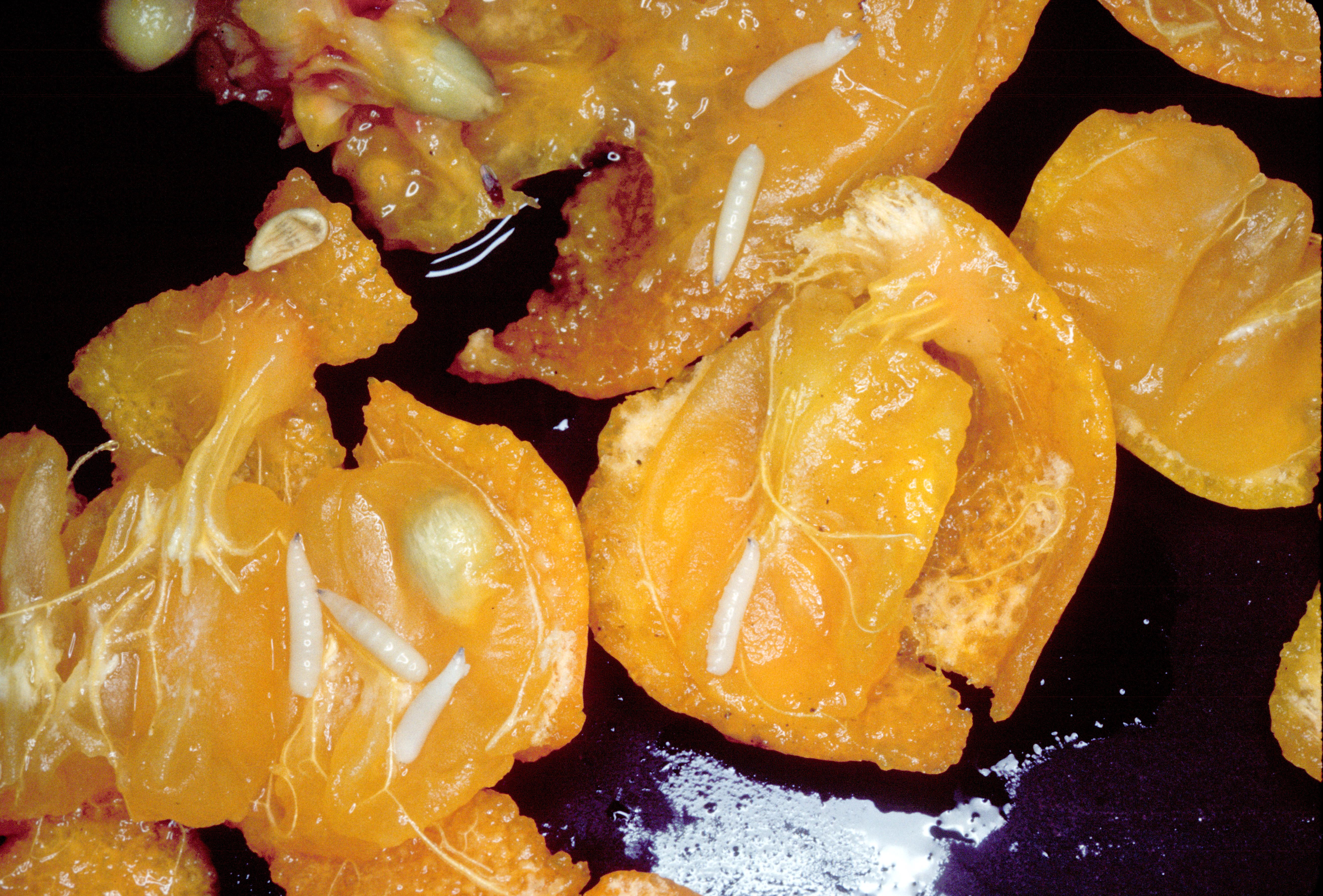
Fruit following infestation at larval stage

Bactrocera carambolae often feed prior to depositing eggs under the skin of a fruit, therefore you can characterize a fruit that has been fed on by the likelihood of dark spots, or imperfections. Dark spots on the skin of fruits are induced by the female carambola fruit fly laying her eggs. Sometimes there may be no symptoms of infestation on the outside of the fruit following feeding, however dark spots are seen especially on carambola, cherry and guava fruits. Carambola fruit flies prefer to feed on tropical fruits, such as mangos, papayas, and oranges, using their proboscis to pierce the skin and suck liquids from the underlying flesh.

=== Mating and pheromones ===
Only adult B. carambolae are capable of mating through sexual reproduction, although the larval stage is capable of producing pheromones to a certain degree. Male B. carambolae are strongly attracted to methyl eugenol (ME), which is a secondary plant compound found worldwide. As they feed on this compound, they convert it into a phenylpropanoid known as (E)-coniferyl alcohol (ECF). This new compound is stored in the rectal gland of the male, ready to be released as a sex pheromone during courtship. Endogenous production of major compound 6-oxo-1-nonanol, and minor compound N-3-methylbutyl acetamide, also contribute to courtship and reproduction. They are stored in the male rectal gland, and when released into the air they create upwind flight via zigzag movement, attracting a significant number of female B. carambolae for courtship. The production of all three endogenous compounds increase with age, reaching its maximum at sexual maturity. The mating period of this species correlates with the time of dusk.

=== Predators ===
The endogenous volatile, 6-oxo-1-nonanol, produced by male B. carambolae is also used a deterrent for predators, such as several species of gecko. The production of this endogenous compound is age-related. The gecko is an avid consumer of immature carambola larvae, however their consumption greatly decreases when it comes to sexually mature male B. carambolae. This effect is also seen on female B. carambolae, who do not naturally create 6-oxo-1-nonanol, when extracted male volatiles are topically applied to the thorax.

== Impact ==
Bactrocera carambolae threaten the economy, diversity, food security, and human health. Total crop failure is common in regions that have been hit with intense fruit fly invasions. The economic losses through invasions by the carambola fruit fly, and those alike, raise a major concern for farmers and government agencies. The plant hosts that are most commonly affected, such as papaya, mango, avocado, are of economic importance. Along with carambola fruit fly invasion comes the risk of increased pesticide and how those chemicals have negative consequences for the environment. In Brazil B. carambolae has been found in 21 host fruits, and is at great risk for dispersal of these pests due to the year-round high temperatures and being a major sector for fruit farming.

== Prevention and control ==
Amazonian isolates of Metarhizium, entomopathogenic fungi, are an effective tool in the control of B. carambolae. In both non-sterile and sterile soil treated with Metarhizium, B. carambolae larvae and pupae perish, and those that do not perish, but grow into adults, decease within five days of emergence from the soil. It is important to consider that carambola fruit flies are highly fertile and long-lived when considering prevention and control techniques.

Wrapping fruit in newspaper, brown paper bag, or a sleeve, is one of the most effective control methods. Wrapping provides a physical barrier to the skin of the fruit, inhibiting the deposition of eggs. This method becomes even more effective when the fruit is wrapped before ripening, as most B. carambolae attack following ripening.

Bait sprays are more environmentally acceptable variants of chemical control compared to cover sprays, and consist of an insecticide and a protein bait. B. carambolae are attracted to the scent of ammonia present in the insecticide, therefore it can be applied to only a small amount of spots in a crop and remain effective.
