= Bactrocera brunnea =

Scientific classification
- Domain: Eukaryota
- Kingdom: Animalia
- Phylum: Arthropoda
- Class: Insecta
- Order: Diptera
- Family: Tephritidae
- Genus: Bactrocera
- Species: B. brunnea

Binomial name
- Bactrocera brunnea Perkins & May, 1949

Species of fly

Bactrocera brunnea is a species of Tephritidae fruit fly.
