= Bactrocera continua =

Scientific classification
- Kingdom: Animalia
- Phylum: Arthropoda
- Clade: Pancrustacea
- Class: Insecta
- Order: Diptera
- Family: Tephritidae
- Genus: Bactrocera
- Species: B. continua

Binomial name
- Bactrocera continua (Bezzi, 1919)

Species of fly

Bactrocera continua is a species of Tephritidae fruit fly.
