= Afrodacus =

Scientific classification
- Kingdom: Animalia
- Phylum: Arthropoda
- Clade: Pancrustacea
- Class: Insecta
- Order: Diptera
- Family: Tephritidae
- Genus: Bactrocera
- Subgenus: Afrodacus; Bezzi, 1924

Subgenus of flies

Afrodacus is a subgenus of tephritid or fruit flies in the family Tephritidae.
