= Bactrocera passiflorae =

Scientific classification
- Kingdom: Animalia
- Phylum: Arthropoda
- Class: Insecta
- Order: Diptera
- Family: Tephritidae
- Genus: Bactrocera
- Species: B. passiflorae

Binomial name
- Bactrocera passiflorae Froggatt, 1910

Synonyms
- Chaetodacus passiflorae (Froggatt); Dacus passiflorae Froggatt; Strumeta passiflorae (Froggatt)

Species of insect (Fijian fruit fly)

Bactrocera passiflorae, the Fijian fruit fly, is a species of fly in the family Tephritidae in the insect order Diptera. It is native to several tropical and subtropical islands in the Pacific Ocean and is a pest of fruit crops.

== Description ==
The adult Bactrocera passiflorae is similar in appearance to and slightly smaller than a housefly. It is black apart from yellow markings on the sides of the thorax and a triangular patch of yellow on the dorsal part of the hind part of the thorax. The wings are transparent with the exception of the dusky leading edge.

== Distribution and habitat ==
Bactrocera passiflorae occurs on Fiji but not on Rotuma, on Niue, on Tonga and on Wallis and Futuna. It can be found where there is ripening fruit, in gardens, orchards, villages, towns and coastal locations, but not in dense forests. Its hosts include such fruits as passion fruit, guava, Indian almond, rose apple, cashew, breadfruit, pawpaw, kumquat, orange, mandarin, pomelo, mango, Malay apple, Pacific lychee, Ochrosia oppositifolia, Cerbera manghas, Barringtonia edulis, and Tahitian chestnut.

== Ecology ==
Bactrocera passiflorae feeds on fruit juices, nectar, honeydew, bird droppings and bacteria. The fruit flies are attracted to fruit by their shape and colour, and by the smell of the fruit and foliage. The female fly punctures the skin of the fruit with its ovipositor and lays a batch of eggs under the surface; this process introduces bacteria into the fruit which starts to rot. The eggs hatch after about two days and the larvae start to eat the rotting flesh. When the rotten fruit falls to the ground, the larvae move into the soil and pupate. After metamorphosis, the adult flies emerge, with the newly emerged females needing additional supplies of protein-rich food before they became sexually mature. The whole life cycle from egg to adult takes some 18 to 20 days.

Where this fly occurs it can be very damaging, occurring in up to 100% of the fruit. The insects are killed if the picked or fallen fruits are eaten by vertebrates; parasitoids attack the larvae and the pupae suffer heavy mortality in the soil. Classical biological pest control has not been successful at controlling the fruit flies but may cause a decrease in their numbers.
