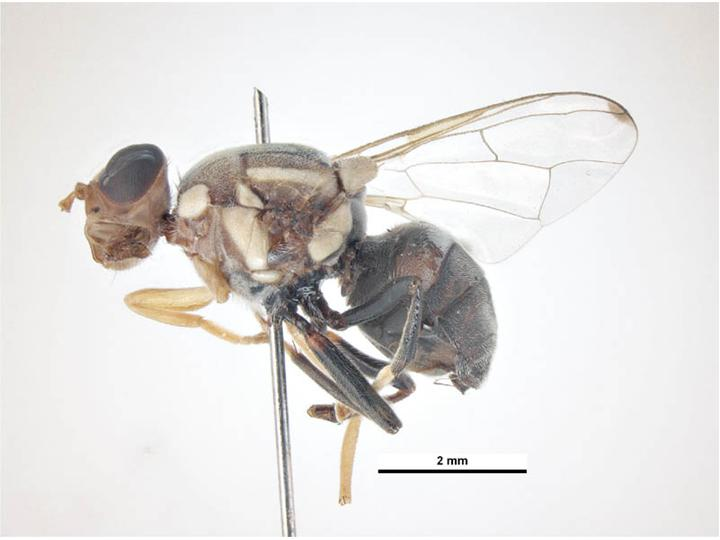

Scientific classification
- Kingdom: Animalia
- Phylum: Arthropoda
- Clade: Pancrustacea
- Class: Insecta
- Order: Diptera
- Family: Tephritidae
- Genus: Bactrocera
- Species: B. correcta

Binomial name
- Bactrocera correcta (Bezzi, 1916)

Synonyms
- Chaetodacus correctus

= Bactrocera correcta =

Species of fly

Bactrocera correcta is a species of tephritid fruit flies that is widely distributed in Southeast Asia. It is a serious pest species with a broad host range and has caused major infestations in Vietnam and Thailand.

== Similar species ==
It is similar to B. dorsalis in color pattern, but has transverse facial spots and an incomplete costal band. It also resembles B. penecorrecta.
