= Methyl eugenol =

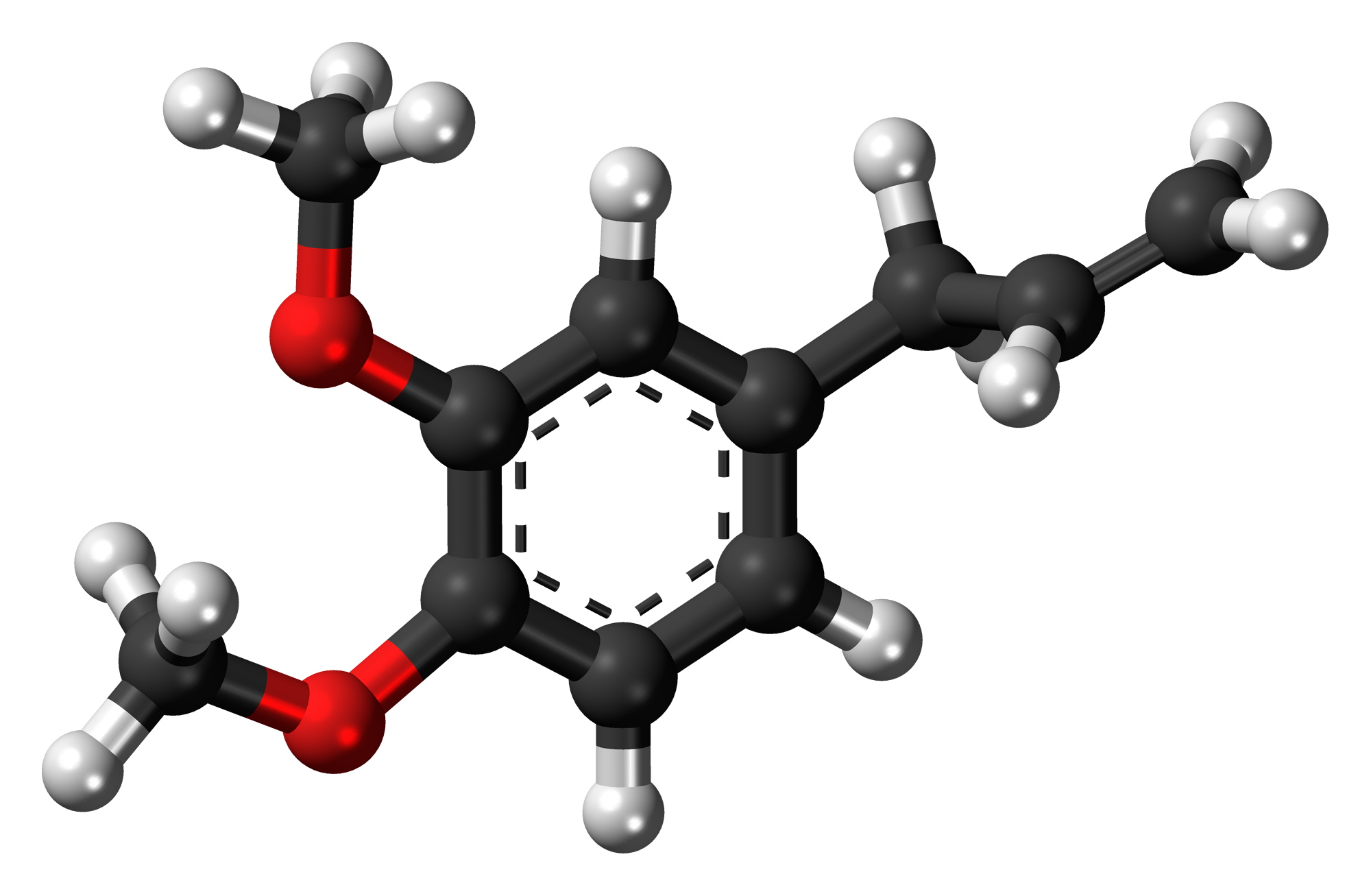

Names
- Preferred IUPAC name 1,2-Dimethoxy-4-(prop-2-enyl)benzene
- Other names 4-Allyl-1,2-dimethoxybenzene; Allylveratrol; 4-Allylveratrol; Eugenol methyl ether Methyleugenol

Identifiers
CAS Number	93-15-2
3D model (JSmol)	Interactive image
ChEBI	CHEBI:4918
ChEMBL	ChEMBL108861
ChemSpider	21106140
ECHA InfoCard	100.002.022
EC Number	202-223-0
KEGG	C10454
PubChem CID	7127
UNII	29T9VA6R7M
CompTox Dashboard (EPA)	DTXSID5025607
- InChI: InChI=1S/C11H14O2/c1-4-5-9-6-7-10(12-2)11(8-9)13-3/h4,6-8H,1,5H2,2-3H3
- SMILES: COc1cc(ccc1OC)CC=C

Properties
Chemical formula	C_{11}H_{14}O_{2}
Molar mass	178.231 g·mol^{−1}
Density	0.98 g/cm^{3}
Melting point	-2 °C
Boiling point	254.7 °C
- Except where otherwise noted, data are given for materials in their standard state (at 25 °C [77 °F], 100 kPa). Infobox references

Methyl eugenol (allylveratrol) is a natural chemical compound classified as a phenylpropene, a type of phenylpropanoid. It is the methyl ether of eugenol and is important to insect behavior and pollination. It is found in various essential oils.

Methyl eugenol is found in a number of plants (over 450 species from 80 families including both angiosperm and gymnosperm families) and has a role in attracting pollinators. About 350 plant species have them as a component of floral fragrance. Their ability to attract insects, particularly Bactrocera fruit flies (particularly, Bactrocera dorsalis male flies) was first noticed in 1915 by F. M. Howlett. The compound may have evolved in response to pathogens, as methyl eugenol has some antifungal activity. It also repels many insects.

As of October 2018, the US FDA withdrew authorization for the use of methyl eugenol as a synthetic flavoring substance for use in food because petitioners (including the Natural Resources Defense Council, the Center for Food Safety, and the Center for Science in the Public Interest) provided data demonstrating that these additives induce cancer in laboratory animals. FDA noted the action was despite its continuing stance that this substance does not pose a risk to public health under the conditions of its intended use.

In European Union member states, starting in 2021, any product that contains more than 0.01% of Methyl Eugenol must contain a label to this effect this as per the CLP regulation (Regulation (EC) No 1272/2008)

== See also ==
- Methyl isoeugenol
- PiHKAL § Essential amphetamines
