= Bactrocera fulvoabdominalis =

Scientific classification
- Kingdom: Animalia
- Phylum: Arthropoda
- Class: Insecta
- Order: Diptera
- Family: Tephritidae
- Genus: Bactrocera
- Species: B. fulvoabdominalis

Binomial name
- Bactrocera fulvoabdominalis White & Evenhuis 1999

Species of fly

Bactrocera fulvoabdominalis is a species of tephritid or fruit flies in the genus Bactrocera of the family Tephritidae.
