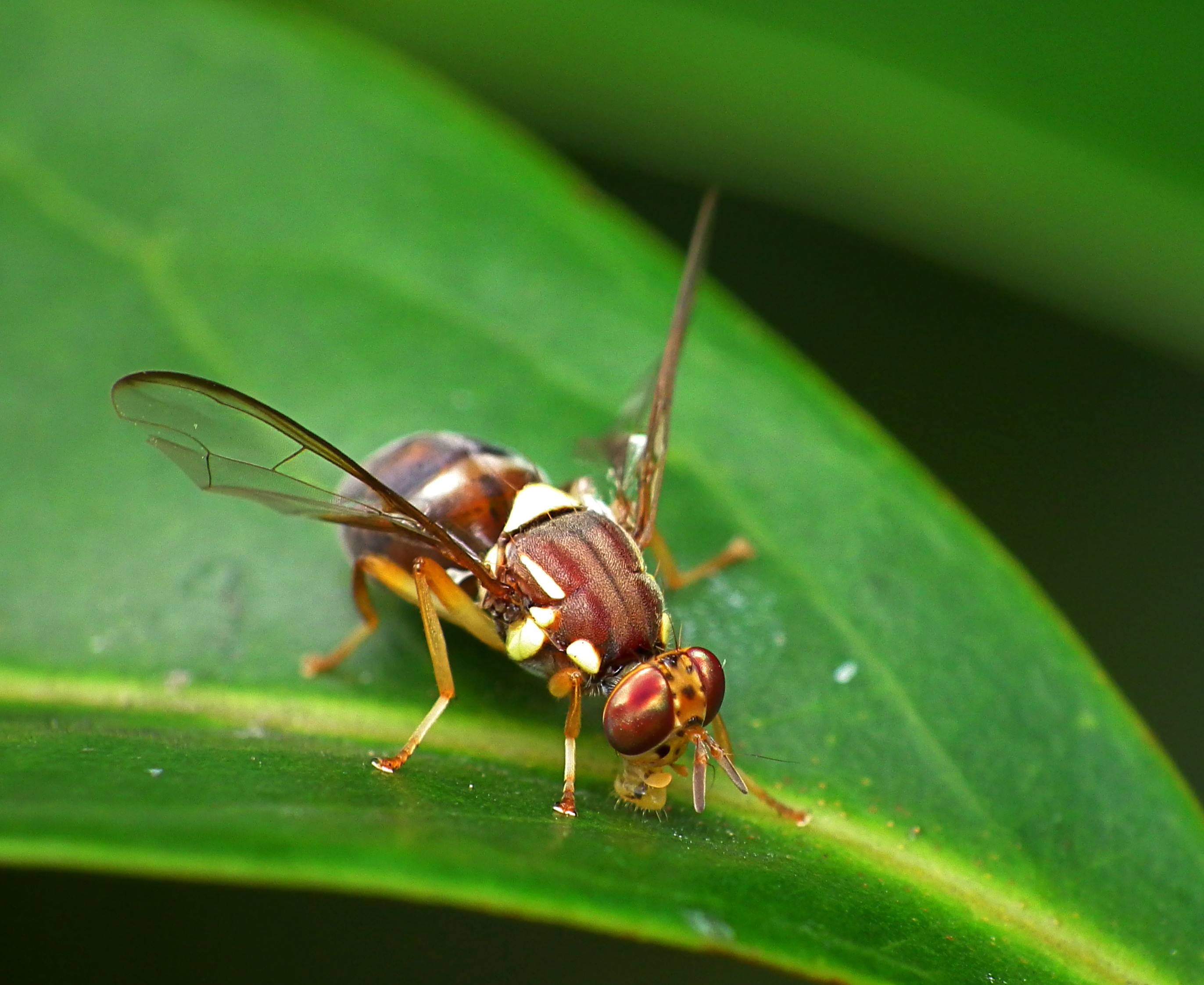

Scientific classification
- Kingdom: Animalia
- Phylum: Arthropoda
- Clade: Pancrustacea
- Class: Insecta
- Order: Diptera
- Family: Tephritidae
- Genus: Bactrocera
- Species: B. tryoni

Binomial name
- Bactrocera tryoni (Froggatt, 1897)

Synonyms
- Chaetodacus tryoni var. juglandis; Chaetodacus tryoni var. sarcocephali; Dacus tryoni; Tephritis tryoni

= Bactrocera tryoni =

Species of fly

Bactrocera tryoni, the Queensland fruit fly, is a species of fly in the family Tephritidae in the insect order Diptera. B. tryoni is native to subtropical coastal Queensland and northern New South Wales. They are active during the day, but mate at night. B. tryoni lay their eggs in fruit. The larvae then hatch and proceed to consume the fruit, causing the fruit to decay and drop prematurely. B. tryoni are responsible for an estimated $28.5 million a year in damage to Australian crops and are the most costly horticultural pest in Australia. Up to 100% of exposed fruit can be destroyed due to an infestation of this fly species. Previously, pesticides were used to eliminate B. tryoni from damaging crops. However, these chemicals are now banned. Thus, experts devoted to B. tryoni control have transitioned to studying this pests' behaviors to determine a new method of elimination.

== Identification ==
Adult B. tryoni flies are reddish brown in color, have distinct yellow markings and are typically 5–8 mm in length. Adults hold their wings horizontally when walking and flick them in a specific, characteristic manner. The wingspan of B. tryoni ranges from 4.8 to 6.3 mm. B. tryoni may be mistaken for wasps as they appear wasp-like.

=== Complex and sister species ===
They are part of a species complex, or a group of morphologically similar but biologically distinct species. These are called sibling species. B. tryoni has three sibling species: B. neohumeralis, B. aquilonis, and B. melas. All of these flies are sympatric, meaning that they inhabit the same territory, except B. aquilonas, which inhabits a different geographical area in northwest Australia. Genetic data has suggested that B. aquilonas is simply an allopatric population of B. tryoni. Additionally, B. tryoni mate at night, while B. neohumeralis mate during the day. More pertinently, B. neohumeralis are not pests; they do not destroy crops. Despite this behavioral difference, B. neohumeralis and B. tryoni are nearly genetically identical: the two species are only differentiable based on newly developed microsatellite technology. The evolutionary relationship between the species within the B. tryoni complex is unknown.

== Distribution and habitat ==
B. tryoni prefer humid and warm climates. Thus, they are most widespread in eastern Australia, as well as New Caledonia, French Polynesia, the Pitcairn Islands, and the Cook Islands. Commercial fruit production has increased in Australia, increasing the geographical area in which B. tryoni can reside, extending as far inland as central Queensland and New South Wales. Occasionally, there are outbreaks of B. tryoni in southern and western Australia; however, the coastal areas of Australia are relatively isolated from one another due to harsh, dry weather conditions in intervening regions that are unsuitable for B. tryoni. Therefore, other regions of Australia typically remain free of this pest as long as infested fruit is not transported between regions.

== Life cycle ==
=== Egg ===
After passing through a two-week pre-oviposition stage following emergence from the pupae, adult females deposit around seven eggs in a fruit puncture, and may deposit up to 100 eggs per day. Fruit punctures are holes in the skin of the fruit that allow the females to access the nutrient-rich interior. Females often oviposit in punctures made by other fruit flies, such as the Mediterranean fruit fly (Ceratitis capitata), which results in many eggs occurring in a single cavity. Additionally, B. tryoni females can create their own puncture to oviposit in the fruit, called a "sting".

=== Maggot (larva) ===
Eggs hatch into white larvae in 2–4 days under favorable weather conditions. These larvae, or maggots, eat toward the center of the fruit with their cutting jaws, causing it to rot. The maggots may reach up to 9 mm in length; larval development is completed in 10-31 days. At this point, the fruit has likely fallen to the ground. Up to 40 larvae can be reared from a single piece of fruit.

=== Pupal ===
The maggot chews its way out of the remaining fruit and enters the soil, where it enters the pupal stage of development. Pupal development requires various temperature ranges from one week in warmer weather to one month in cooler conditions. The flexible amount of time needed for pupal development has resulted in B. tryoni relative adaptiveness to different environments.

=== Adult ===
After the pupal stage is complete, adults emerge from the soil. This typically occurs near the end of the summer season. Unlike other fly pests, B. tryoni does not breed continuously, but spends the winter in the adult stage. Adult females live many months, and up to four or five overlapping generations may occur annually. Adults may live for a year or longer.

== Behavior ==
=== Host selection ===
B. tryoni have been found to infect almost all commercial fruit crops as hosts, including abiu, apple, avocado, babaco, capsicum, carambola, casimiroa, cherry, citrus, custard apple, granadilla, grape, guava, kiwifruit, mango, nectarine, papaya, passionfruit, peach, pear, persimmon, plum, pomegranate, prune, quince, loquat, santol, sapodilla, tamarillo, tomato, and wax jambu, with the exception of pineapples. B. tryoni strongly prefer to oviposit into rotting fruit, although some evidence suggests that they will oviposit into under-ripe fruit as well. B. tryoni prefer to select fruits that have an outer layer that is able to be punctured or has already been lesioned. The majority of research on B. tryoni host selection has included just a few, economically important crops.

=== Adult feeding behavior ===
Larvae feed only on the flesh of fruit until they mature into adulthood. Adult flies, however, rely on leaf surface bacteria as a major source of protein. There is some evidence suggesting that the bacteria and flies co-evolved, but other data suggest that this symbiosis does not occur as the presence of protein-providing bacteria is not consistent throughout B. tryoni populations. Due to this dependence on protein originating from bacteria, it is possible to control the population by providing flies with artificial protein mixed with insecticide.

=== Mating behavior ===
B. tryoni flies mate at dusk. This is pertinent to control efforts because it is one of the few characteristics that distinguish it from sister species, B. neohumeralis, which are not a highly destructive species, even though the two are very closely related genetically and evolutionarily.

=== Cue-lure in males ===
B. tryoni males exhibit behavior termed cue-lure, meaning that they are strongly attracted to a specific scent. While this scent is artificially made, it is closely related to compounds occurring in nature. Male B. tryoni respond most greatly to the lure in the morning, likely because this is their peak of foraging time; however, an evolutionary reason for the cue-lure is not fully known. Cue-lure is only exhibited in sexually mature males, indicating that mate finding is related to the cue-lure behavior. However, other Bactrocera species have been identified as means of enhancing male competitiveness, or to afford protection from predation.

=== Ovipositional behavior ===
B. tryoni lay their eggs in fruit. Females prefer to lay their eggs in fruit that is sweet, juicy, and not acidic. The presence of other female flies in pre- or post- oviposition on a piece of fruit was found to have no bearing on another female's likeliness to land on the fruit; however, female flies were more likely to bore into a piece of fruit that other female flies were currently ovipositing into, therefore increasing the density of larvae within a single piece of fruit. This is an example of reciprocal altruism as larvae are at an advantage at higher densities.

=== Movement and dispersal ===
B. tryoni have evolved to disperse widely, which was greatly influenced their ability to cause damage to farms. When fruit is available, the flies often do not disperse far distances (only a few hundred meters to a kilometer), but they have been found to travel large distances in the absence of fruit. In addition to lack of resources, adult flies may also move to locate overwintering sites or avoid dry or cold weather.

== Genomic studies ==
The genome of B. tryoni has been sequenced and published by a group at the University of New South Wales, Australia. While the coding regions are mostly completely sequenced, about one-third of the genome appears to consist of highly repetitive sequences.

== Control efforts ==
B. tryoni has been the subject of extensive control regimens. One of these regimens is a Fruit Fly Exclusion Zone (FFEZ), where transporting fruit into certain regions of Australia and Polynesia is illegal. In May 2012, January 2013, February 2015, February 2019 and January 2026, the fly was found in Auckland, posing a risk to horticulture and leading to a quarantine (see Biosecurity in New Zealand).

=== Lure-and-kill tactics ===
Farmers in effected regions are encouraged to use a lure and kill tactic to combat the presence of B. tryoni. Lure and kill tactics include the use of some sort of bait that attracts the pest, or a lure. This can include semiochemical lures such as pheromones, food attractants, host mimics, or color attractants. The killing mechanism often involves pesticides, liquid traps in which the pest drowns, or sticky traps that the pest cannot escape from. At low densities of B. tryoni, lure and kill tactics are most effective as a mechanism to monitor the frequency of B. tryoni; at high densities, they effectively combat the pest via population reduction. Two of the most common lure and kill approaches for B. tryoni are the male annihilation technique (MAT) and the protein-bait spray (PBS).

==== Protein-bait spray ====
Both male and female B. tryoni require proteins produced by bacteria found on the leaves of plants in order to reach sexual maturity. The protein-bait spray takes advantage of this behavior by combining necessary proteins normally acquired from leaf bacteria with deadly insecticides. The combination of protein and insecticide attracts B. tryoni of both sexes, resulting in elimination of adult flies. Neither the effectiveness of this technique, nor the scientific underpinnings of what protein exactly attracts B. tryoni to the spray, are well investigated.

==== Male annihilation technique ====
B. tryoni sexually mature males are strongly responsive to specific scents that may be associated with mating, or a cue-lure. A specific cue-lure, Willson's lure, was found to be incredibly effective at attracting sexually mature B. tryoni males. When combined with insecticides, artificially developed cue lures may be an effective elimination method of sexually mature males. While extensive research has suggested this is an effective strategy in other fly species, very few controlled experiments have been conducted to determine the effectiveness of the male annihilation technique in B. tryoni.

=== Pesticides ===
Control efforts include submerging post-harvest fruit and treating fields of fruit trees with the chemicals dimethoate and fenthion. As of October 2011, the use of these chemicals was under review by the Australian Pesticides and Veterinary Medicines Authority. As a result, dimethoate was suspended from use. As of 2014, fenthion was no longer commercially available in Australia.

=== Sterile insect technique (SIT) ===
Containment efforts have included irradiating pupae in order to induce sterility. A study testing the viability of this technique found that sterility was dose independent, meaning that a single ionizing event was enough to render the male sperm sterile. Additionally, it was found that emergence and flight ability remained unaffected by the ionizing event. This indicates that males sterilized via a low dosage of radiation were equally as competitive as males that were not irradiated.

=== The white locus ===
A popular method for controlling populations of invasive or destructive species of flies involves producing a strain of fly that is incapable of reproducing. If this can be accomplished, this strain can be mass-produced and released into the wild without necessitating repeated exposure to irradiation as required in methods such as the sterile insect technique (SIT).If they have the same sexual competitiveness as wild type males, then the species' overall population will presumably decrease. In order to accomplish developing such a strain in B. tryoni, molecular tools capable of genetically transforming B. tryoni must be implemented. One such strain of a genetically compatible fly has been developed in Drosophila melanogaster. The phenotypic marker for the presence of an efficient vector for gene transfer is white eye color. Development of a genetically engineered B. tryoni strain that is compatible with gene transfer was successful; however, scientists have yet to develop a sterile strain that can be released into the wild.

== Climate change ==
While this species is native to northeastern Australia, rising temperatures due to climate change has allowed the species to spread to other regions of Australia and Polynesia. B. tryoni are able to tolerate extremely high temperatures but have a minimum necessary temperature to breed; therefore, global warming has fostered their spread across Australia and Polynesia. Although B. tryoni have a minimum temperature requirement for survival, extreme plasticity and adaptation has been observed in adult B. tryoni. This adaptation has allowed them to survive in cooler temperatures and at higher altitudes. This behavior, combined with global warming, indicates that damage due to these insects will continue to increase as the temperatures continue to rise. One study predicted that farm damage due to Queensland fruit flies will increase by $3.1, $4.7, and $12.0 million with temperature increases of 0.5, 1 and 2 °C, respectively.

=== Simulations of climate change ===
Rising CO_{2} levels may influence the distribution of B. tryoni. Based upon recent studies which utilize computer programs to simulate B. tryoni distribution in the event of rising temperatures, it was predicted that there will be an overall increase in Queensland fruit fly damage, but the fruit flies will re-localize to more southerly locations as northern and central Queensland will begin to exceed the maximum habitable temperature of B. tryoni. However, these simulations may not accurately predict the future distributions of B. tryoni as they have exhibited an immense capability to adapt to various conditions. The prediction is also complicated by the uncertainty of how the relative humidity will change in regions across Australia as temperature increases, and B. tryoni survival is heavily dependent upon a humid climate.
