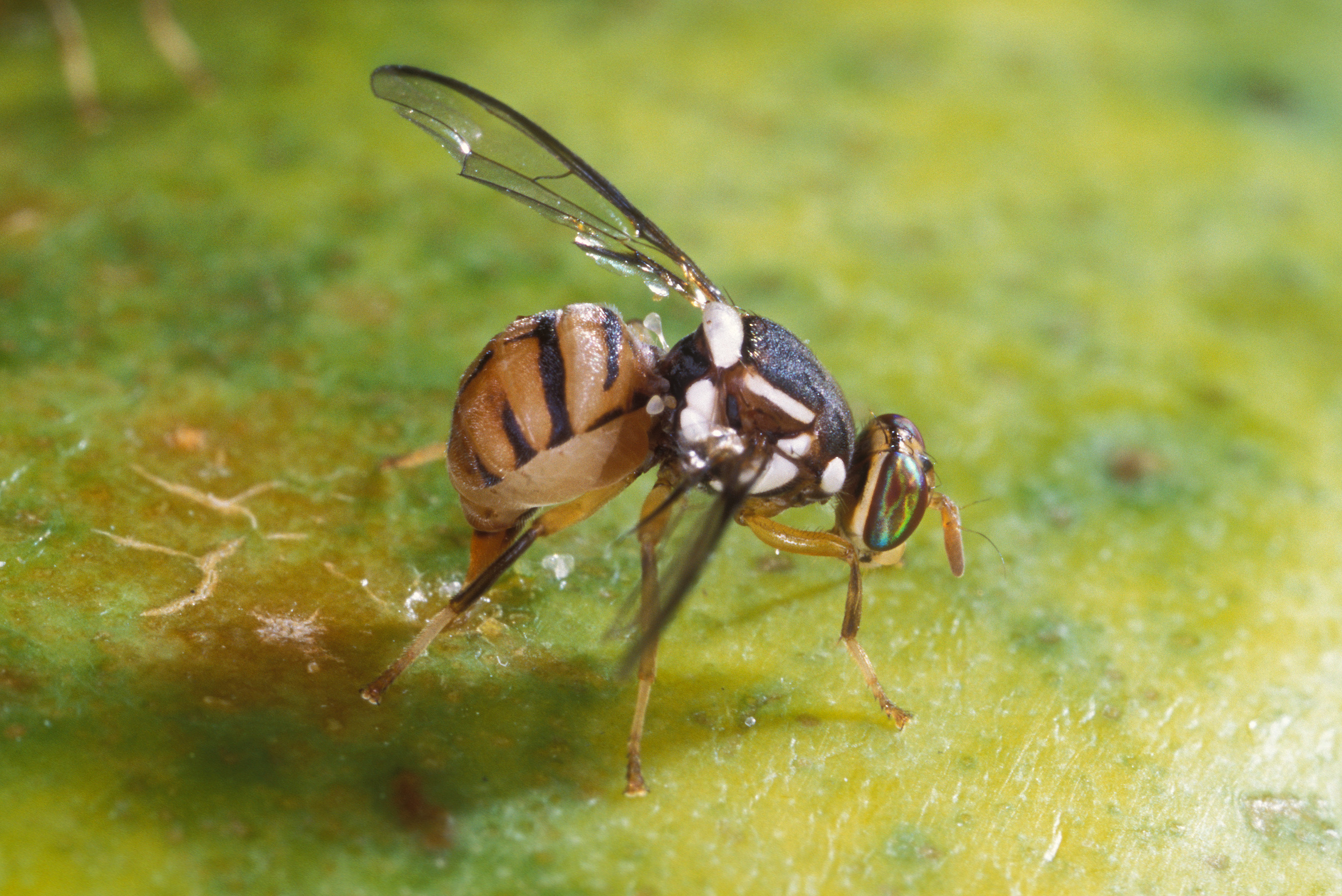

Scientific classification
- Kingdom: Animalia
- Phylum: Arthropoda
- Clade: Pancrustacea
- Class: Insecta
- Order: Diptera
- Family: Tephritidae
- Genus: Bactrocera
- Species: B. dorsalis

Binomial name
- Bactrocera dorsalis (Hendel, 1912)
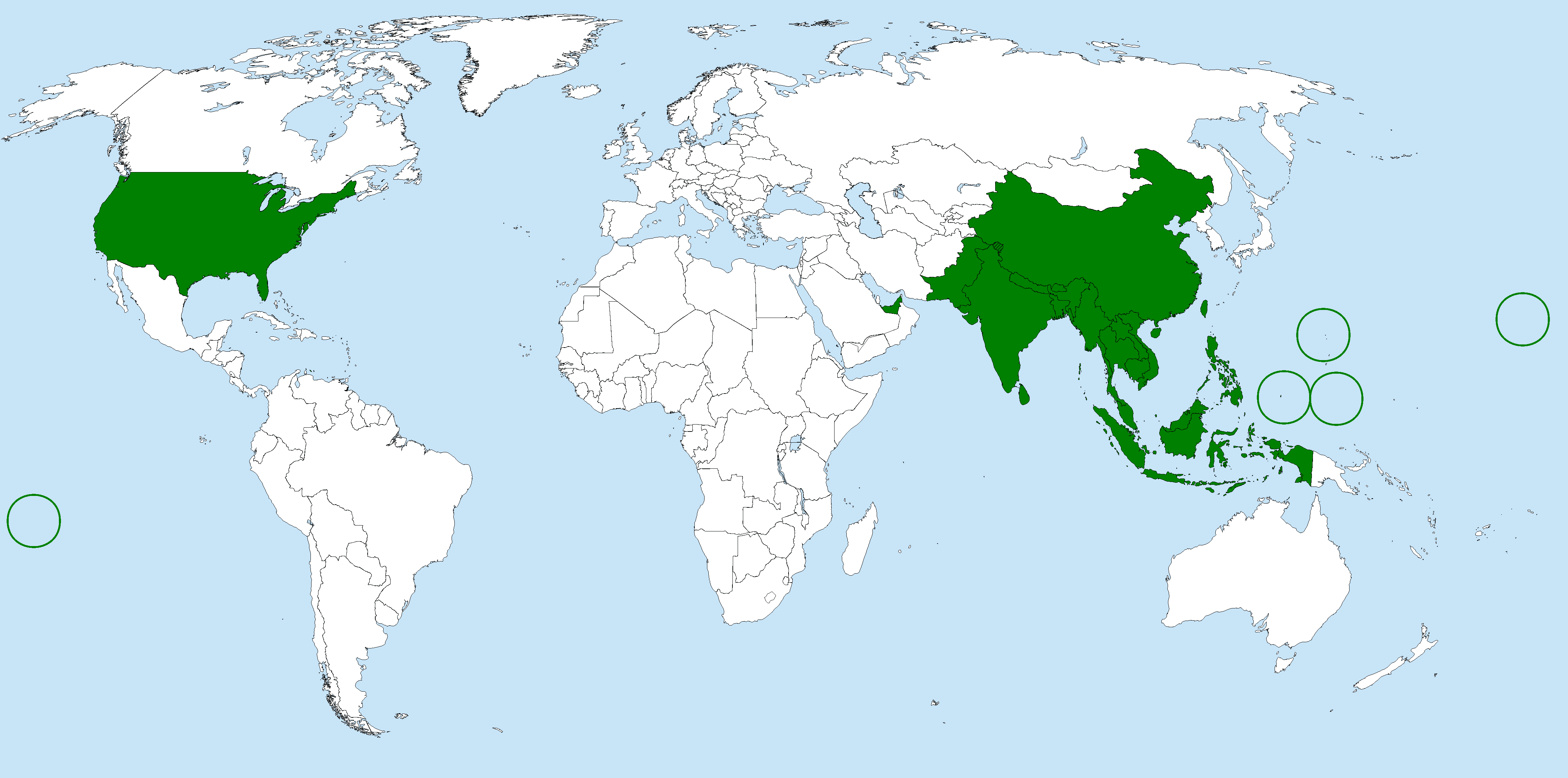
- Bactrocera dorsalis range (by country)

Synonyms
- Dacus dorsalis

= Bactrocera dorsalis =

Species of insect

Bactrocera dorsalis, previously known as Dacus dorsalis and commonly referred to as the oriental fruit fly, is a species of tephritid fruit fly that is originally from to Southeast Asia. It is one of the major pest species in the genus Bactrocera with a broad host range of cultivated and wild fruits. Male B. dorsalis respond strongly to methyl eugenol, which is used to monitor and estimate populations, as well as to annihilate males as a form of pest control. They are also important pollinators and visitors of wild orchids, Bulbophyllum cheiri and Bulbophyllum vinaceum in Southeast Asia, which lure the flies using methyl eugenol.

The fly is similar to the closely related species B. carambolae and B. occipitalis. The species name B. dorsalis is identical to other synonyms B. papayae, B. invadens and B. philippinensis.

== Description ==
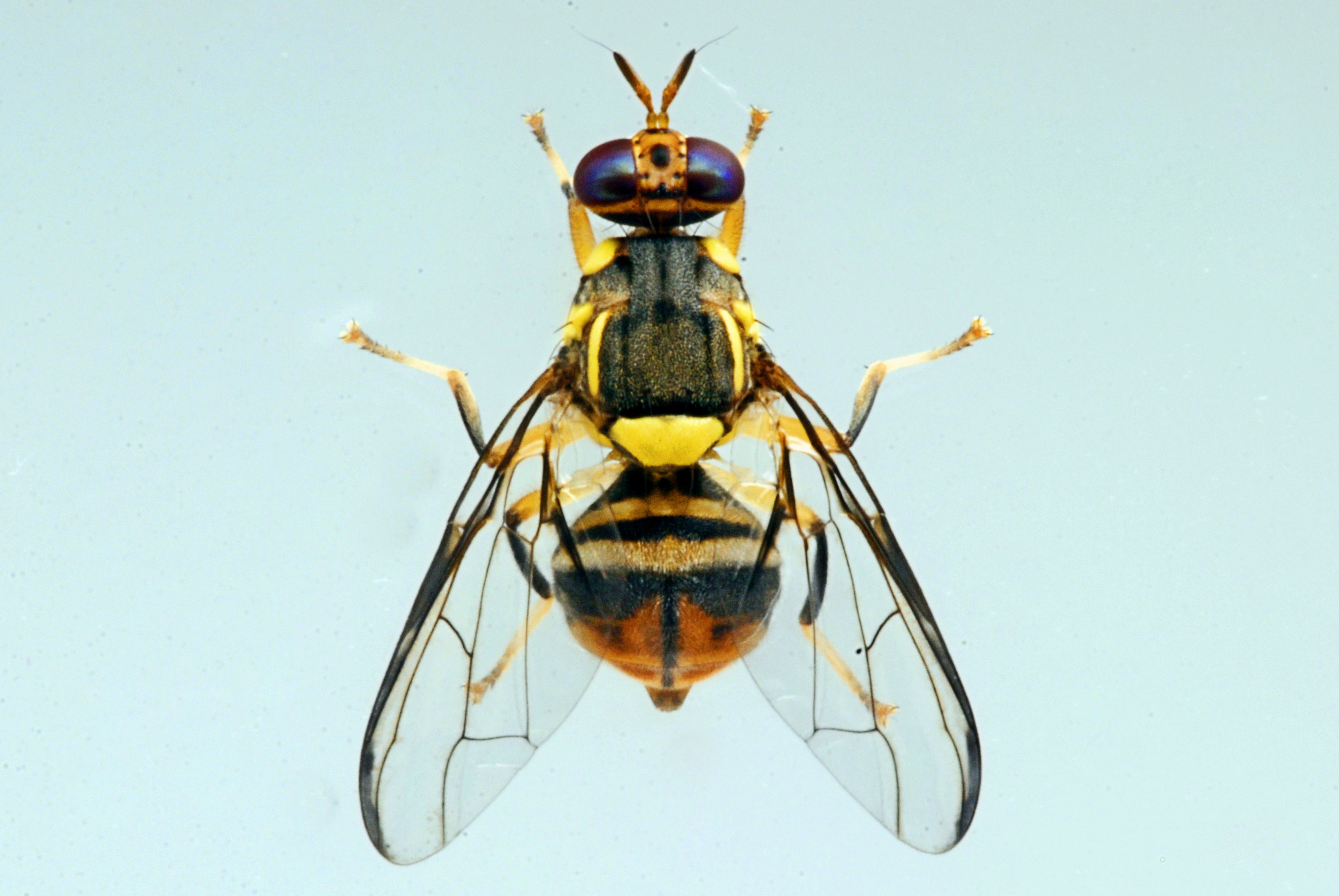
B. dorsalis thorax and abdomen

B. dorsalis is a species of tephritid fruit fly. Flies that belong to this family are usually small to medium-sized with colorful markings. In particular, B. dorsalis belongs to a complex of physically similar flies called the Bactrocera dorsalis complex, whose defining characteristics include a mostly black thorax and dark T-shaped marking on the fly's abdominal segment. The T-shape marking consists of a dark medial and transverse band along the fly's abdomen.

The B. dorsalis species has distinctive yellow and black markings on its thorax and abdomen, which may vary between flies. Two vertical yellow markings on the thorax and the dark T-shaped marking on the abdomen differentiate this species of fly from its close relatives. The wings are clear with a continuous costal band. The adult body is around 8.0 mm in length, with wings approximately 7.3 mm in length. The female adult has a tapered ovipositor for depositing eggs in host fruits, while in male adults this ovipositor is notably absent.

== Distribution ==
B. dorsalis is found in tropical and subtropical areas and is endemic to Southeast Asia. It is a highly invasive pest species. From 1910 to 1990, the fly species was only observed in 5 countries; however, in the last three decades, the rate of spread by B. dorsalis has sharply increased, with the species invading an additional 70 countries. It now has a presence in at least 65 countries. They can be found in the USA, China, the UAE, the rest of Southeast Asia, India, Brunei, Malaysia, the Philippines, The Mariana Islands, Timor Leste, Pakistan, Taiwan and the rest of South Asia. It has also been introduced to Hawaii, the Mariana Islands, and Tahiti. The fly is also found in most countries of sub-Saharan Africa. Individuals have been found and eradicated in New Zealand.

B. dorsalis has been spotted in California and Florida. These appearances then trigger a cascade of eradication efforts. Four major oriental fruit fly eradication efforts occurred in response to infestations in California between 1960 and 1997. Two additional infestations were eradicated in 2006 and 2007, occurring within 3–4 years of reports of these infestations. In July 2010, flies were discovered in traps in the Sacramento and Placer counties of California. A quarantine was established, and eradication efforts followed. These sightings in the mainland United States are generally quarantined infestations that have been eradicated.

CLIMEX, a modeling software, has been used to map the future trajectory for the fruit fly in terms of opportunities for increasing its distribution. This was tested both under current and future predicted climate conditions, given the current research on climate change. Under current conditions, the fly's projected distribution includes much of the tropics and subtropics and extends into areas like Mediterranean Europe. The model predicts optimal climate conditions in the southeast United States. Under climate change conditions, the spread overall increases as the fly is less limited by cold weather. However, its distribution does possibly decrease in areas where precipitation decreases.

== Habitat ==
B. dorsalis prefers to pupate in shaded rather than brightly lit areas, moist over dry soil, and in soil with larger particles (particle size greater than or equal to 2.5 mm) than in soil with smaller particles.

== Life history ==
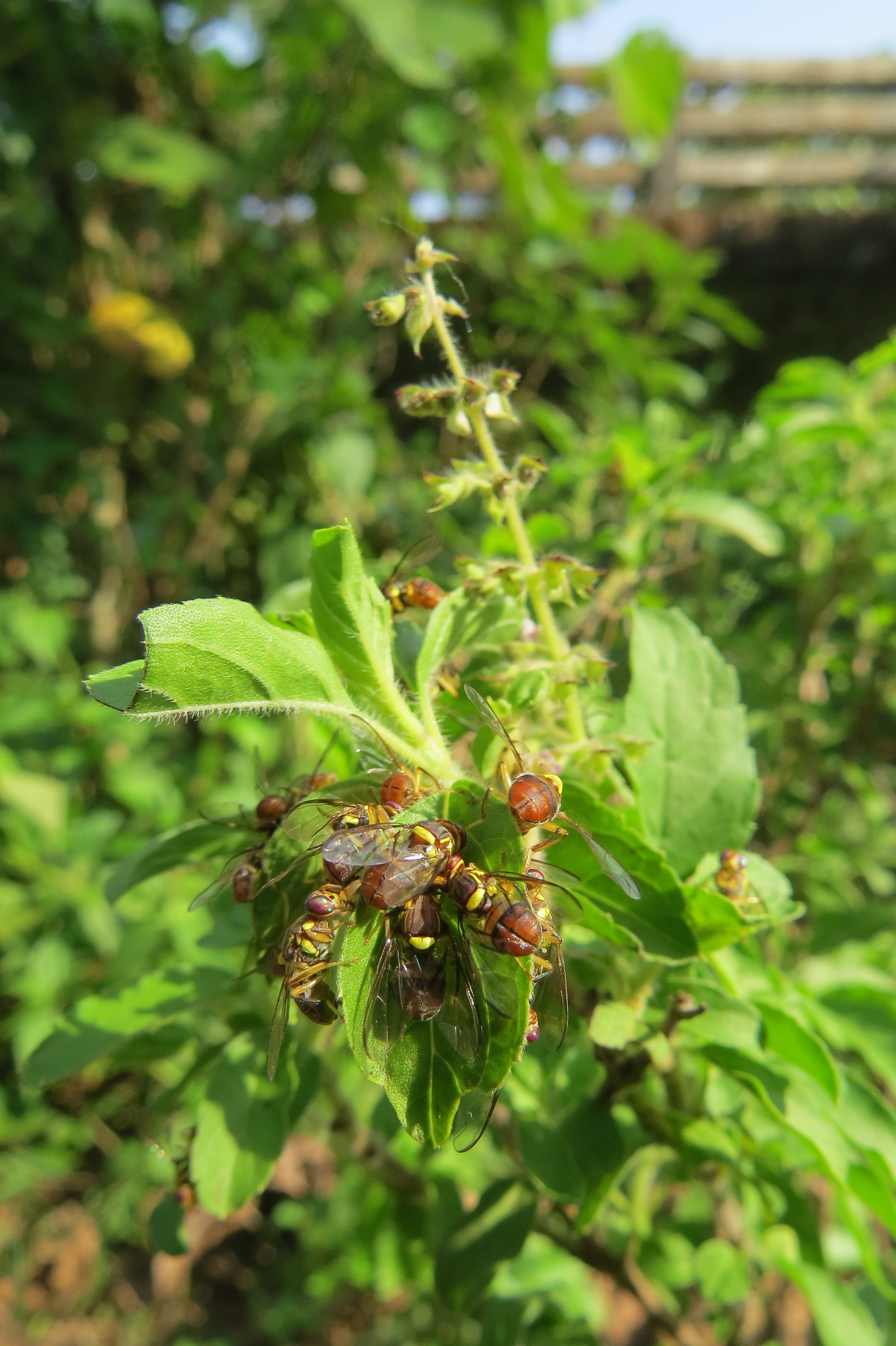
B. dorsalis

Under summer conditions, development from egg to adult requires 16 days. Several stages can be delayed in cooler conditions. B. dorsalis eggs may take up to 20 days to hatch under cool conditions, extended from the usual single day. Pupariation occurs in the soil under the host plant and is normally completed within 10–12 days, but can be delayed up to 90 days under cool conditions. Flies typically live from 1–3 months, but this can be extended to up to 12 months under cool conditions.

Mated female B. dorsalis puncture the skin of mature fruit and deposit eggs in a few batches of 3–30 eggs underneath a fruit's skin via ovipositor, depending on the quality and ripeness of the fruit. Eggs usually hatch within a day, although the hatching process can be delayed in cool conditions. Females are capable of laying over 3,000 eggs during their lifetime under optimal conditions, but in field conditions, reports a typical range from about 1,200 to 1,500 eggs laid per female.

Eggs hatch to larvae and moult twice (there are three larval instars) while feeding on the flesh of the fruit for about 6–35 days. Larvae are creamy white in color with a maggot-like appearance and are about 10 mm in length.

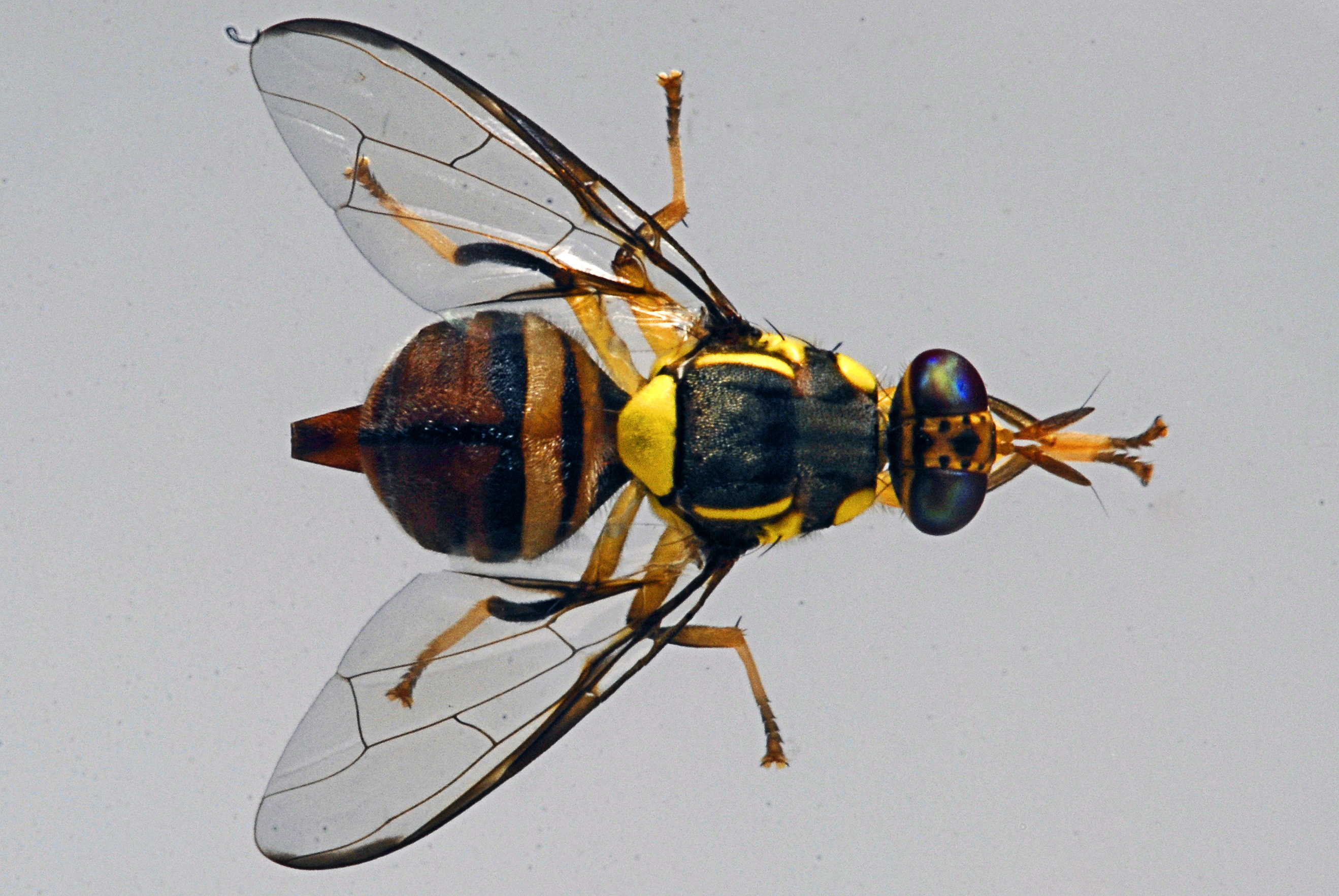
B. dorsalis adult

The third instar larvae exit the fruit and burrow into the soil under the host plant to pupate. Larvae generally pupate in the upper 4 cm of the soil. Pupation can take approximately 10–12 days, but depending on the season, this process can be delayed in cooler conditions.

In 1–2 weeks, the adult emerges from the pupae and matures. Most adults emerge from the soil between 7:00 AM and 10:00 AM. Once sexual maturity is reached (which takes approximately 9 days), adults engage in the mating process and the life cycle repeats. The adult lifespan for B. dorsalis is about 90 days, and the flies have been reported to travel up to 30 miles in search of new egg laying sites and food, such as decaying fruit and plant nectar. Adult females prefer to lay eggs in old egg deposit sites on fruits.

== Food resources ==
B. dorsalis has been seen in more than 200 kinds of fruit and nut plants, but the species lay eggs in mango, papaya, and avocado fruits most often. Adult flies feed on decaying fruit, plant nectar, and other substances during their lifetime and prefer to feed in the morning.

== Social behavior ==
=== Mating ===
Polyandry has been observed in B. dorsalis. For females, there is typically a re-mating refractory period. The length of this period does not vary based on whether the female is mating with a virgin or non-virgin male. However, when there was a refractory period, females lay more eggs. Females who were exposed to two males continuously without a refractory period in between lay fewer eggs, but still lay more eggs than females with only one male. Therefore, there appears to be a reproductive benefit for females with polyandry.

Reproductive senescence does appear to be present in this species, as male and female age correlates negatively with the rate of fertilization.

=== Flying ===
The flight capacity of B. dorsalis adult females at various life stages has been observed in order to better understand and prevent their spread. Past research has shown that the species can spread extensively following fruit harvests, with a dispersal radius up to 37 km observed in Hawaii. Transmission electron microscopy was employed to view changes in flight muscle ultrastructures. Researchers observed that flight speed and distance changed with the age of the fruit fly, reaching its maximum capacity at 15 days of age.

B. dorsalis has been observed to be capable of long-distance flight. One study investigated the relationship between flight muscle structure and the flies' flight capacity: as the number of mitochondria increased, myofibril diameter increased, and sarcomere length decreased, the researchers found the fly's flight capacity to be maximized. This particular muscle structure was evident in 15-day-old female adult B. dorsalis flies.

=== Symbiotic relationships ===
B. dorsalis has symbiotic relationships with many bacteria. Different bacteria dominate at different developmental stages of the fruit fly. Pseudomonadota are most often present in immature stages, whereas Bacillota are most often present in the adult stages. Overall, the most abundant families are Enterococcaceae and Comamondaceae. Meanwhile, Comamonas are extremely abundant in pupae, but disappear entirely by adulthood.

Researchers have also tested the relationship between certain gut symbiotic bacteria and fly foraging behavior and nutrient ingestion. Suppression of the fly's microbiome resulted in changes in the foraging behavior in both male and female flies. Aposymbiotic flies responded faster to diets in experimental conditions and fed more, for longer periods of time.

== Interactions with humans ==
Human activities are mainly responsible for causing the spread of the species from one region to another. The primary risk comes from import of fruit that may contain larvae, either in passenger cargo, or through the smuggling of fruit in passenger baggage or mail. In New Zealand, researchers recorded 7–33 interceptions of fruit flies per year in cargo. Researchers also recorded an additional 10–28 interceptions in passenger baggage.

=== Agricultural pest ===
B. dorsalis is not only a highly invasive species, accidentally introduced to Hawaii from Taiwan during the 1940s in World War II, but also very destructive to crop yield for farmers of various fruits, vegetables, and nuts across the world. The larval stage of the life cycle is the most damaging to fruits because of larval feeding on the soft flesh of fruits. After ovipositing occurs by a female fly, the larvae develop under the skin of the fruit or soft tissues of the plant and begin to feed on the fruit or plant's flesh. Once feeding occurs, other microorganisms can invade the site of larval feeding and cause the fruit to decay faster. Although ripe fruits are believed to be preferred for ovipositing, unripe fruits have served as hosts for eggs as well.

==== Conventional pest treatment ====
B. dorsalis has created many agricultural issues for humans, especially in the areas where it is endemic. In the Pacific Islands, the fly has restricted the development of a diverse tropical fruit and vegetable industry, necessitated that commercial fruits go through quarantine treatment before shipment, and provided an avenue for their introduction to countries not previously exposed to the fly species. The Miami-Dade County in Florida had to perform the quarantine technique when the insect was detected in fruits there in August 2015; they were eliminated from the area in February 2016.

To resolve these concerns, several techniques have been implemented, including sterile insect technique, protein bait sprays, and male annihilation. Male annihilation technique is effective because methyl eugenol attracts male flies prior to the beginning of their sexual maturation, to an extent of 40 to 50 percent of the flies.

One of the most experimentally effective control techniques has been the wrapping of fruit, often in a paper or polythene sleeve. This physical barrier prevents oviposition from occurring. The caveat with this method is that it must be implemented far in advance of the fruit fly's presence. Alternatively, fruits can be harvested earlier in the season than the flies anticipate; this has proven effective with the mango fruit.

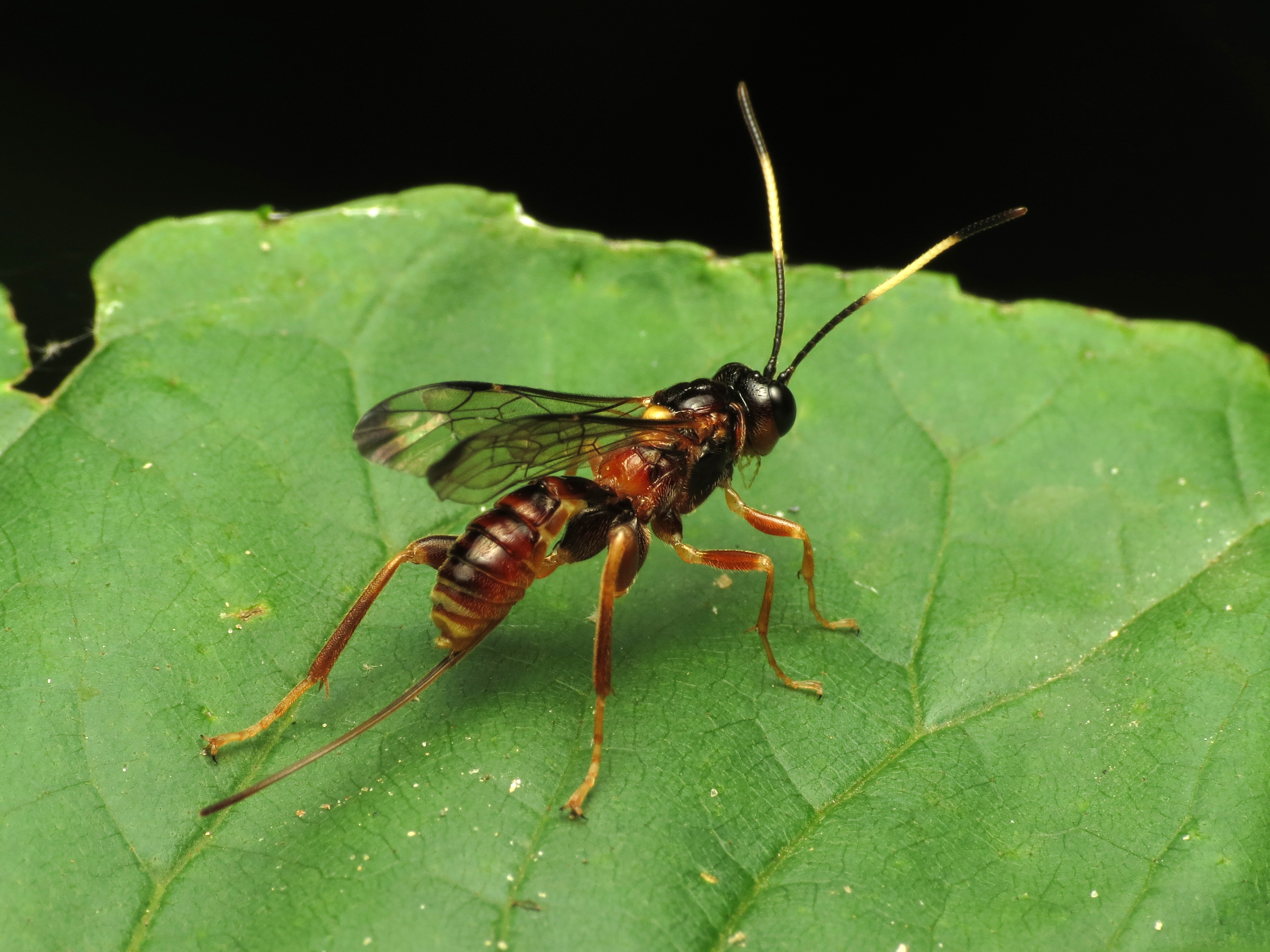
Parasitoid wasp

==== Parasitoid wasps ====
In addition to these, Hawaii has developed methods to suppress Bactrocera species using parasitoid wasps, including Fopius arisanus. The parasitic wasp oviposits its own eggs into B. dorsalis eggs, the parasitoids are reared in the host, and the developed parasitoids emerge in the pupal stage. F. arisanus has been observed to be the most successful example of parasitoid control of B. dorsalis, and researchers are looking to introduce its model of suppression from Hawaii to other areas of the world that the fly affects.

==== Field sanitation ====
One simple, but effective technique called field sanitation, through which all unmarketable fruits get removed from the fields and disposed as soon as they are observed, so that re-infestation does not occur.

=== Insecticide resistance ===
Many organophosphorus insecticides target the enzyme acetylcholinesterase (AChE); mutations in the acetylcholinesterase gene of B. dorsalis have been found to be associated to resistance to such insecticides. Researchers have identified three point mutations in B. dorsalis' gene encoding AChE that generate nonsynonymous changes in the produced amino acid sequence. Two of the point mutations are identical in site to mutations identified in other Bactrocera species, but one of the mutations is specific to B. dorsalis. Widespread use of such insecticides could result in rapid resistance acquisition in populations of B. dorsalis.
