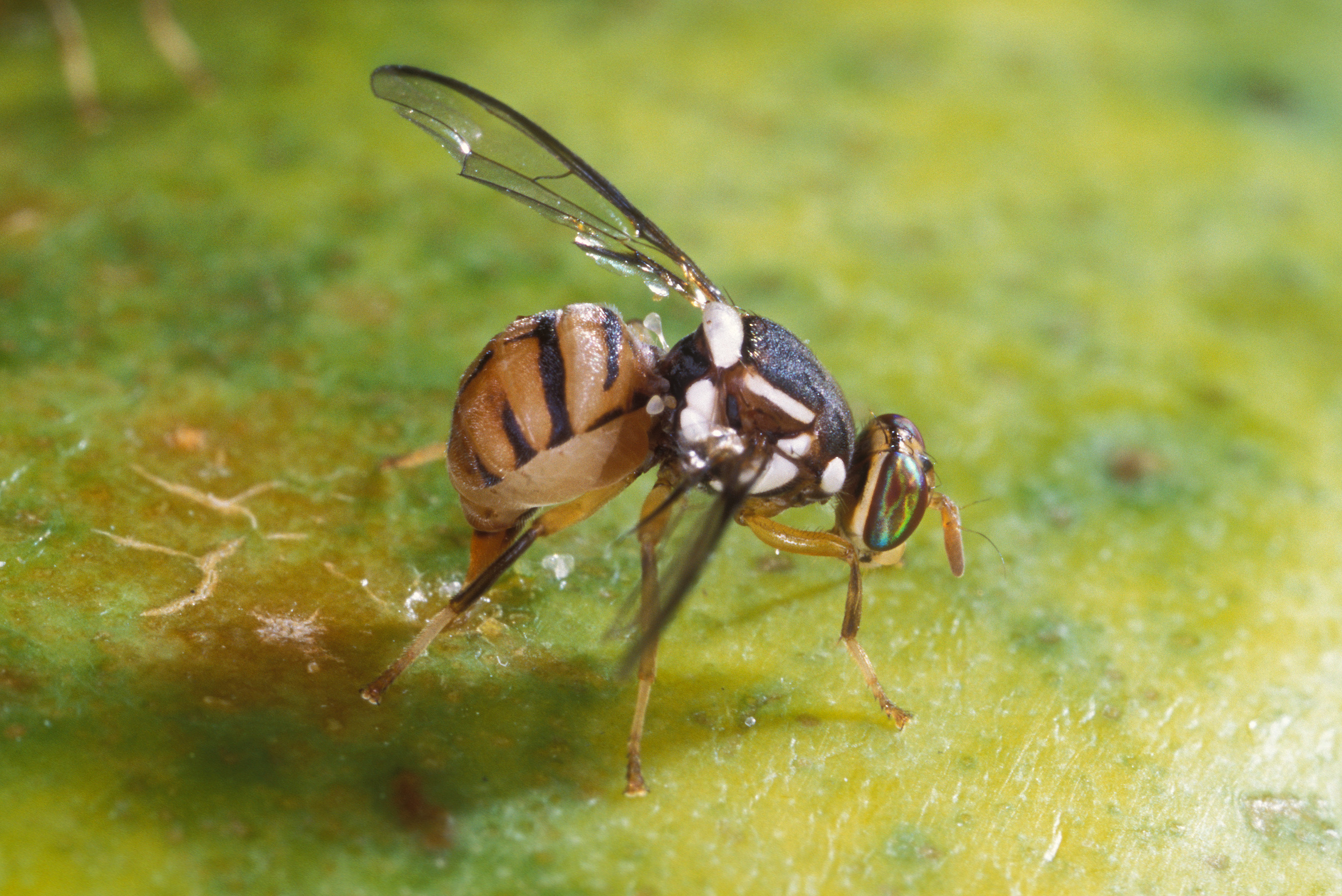
- Bactrocera dorsalis

Scientific classification
- Kingdom: Animalia
- Phylum: Arthropoda
- Class: Insecta
- Order: Diptera
- Family: Tephritidae
- Subfamily: Dacinae
- Tribe: Dacini
- Genus: Bactrocera; Macquart, 1835

Type species
- Bactrocera longicornis Macquart, 1835

Species
- B. correcta B. dorsalis B. oleae B. tryoni B. zonata B. divenderi Hundreds more

Diversity
- 464 species

Synonyms
- Aglaodacus Munro, 1984; Apodacus Perkins, 1939; Chaetodacus Bezzi, 1913; Dasyneura Saunders, 1842; Hemigymnodacus Hardy, 1973; Marquesadacus Malloch, 1932; Mauritidacus Munro, 1984; Strumeta Walker, 1856

= Bactrocera =

Genus of flies

Bactrocera is a large genus of tephritid fruit flies, with close to 500 species currently described and accepted.

== Name ==
The genus name is derived from Ancient Greek bakter "rod" and kera "horn".

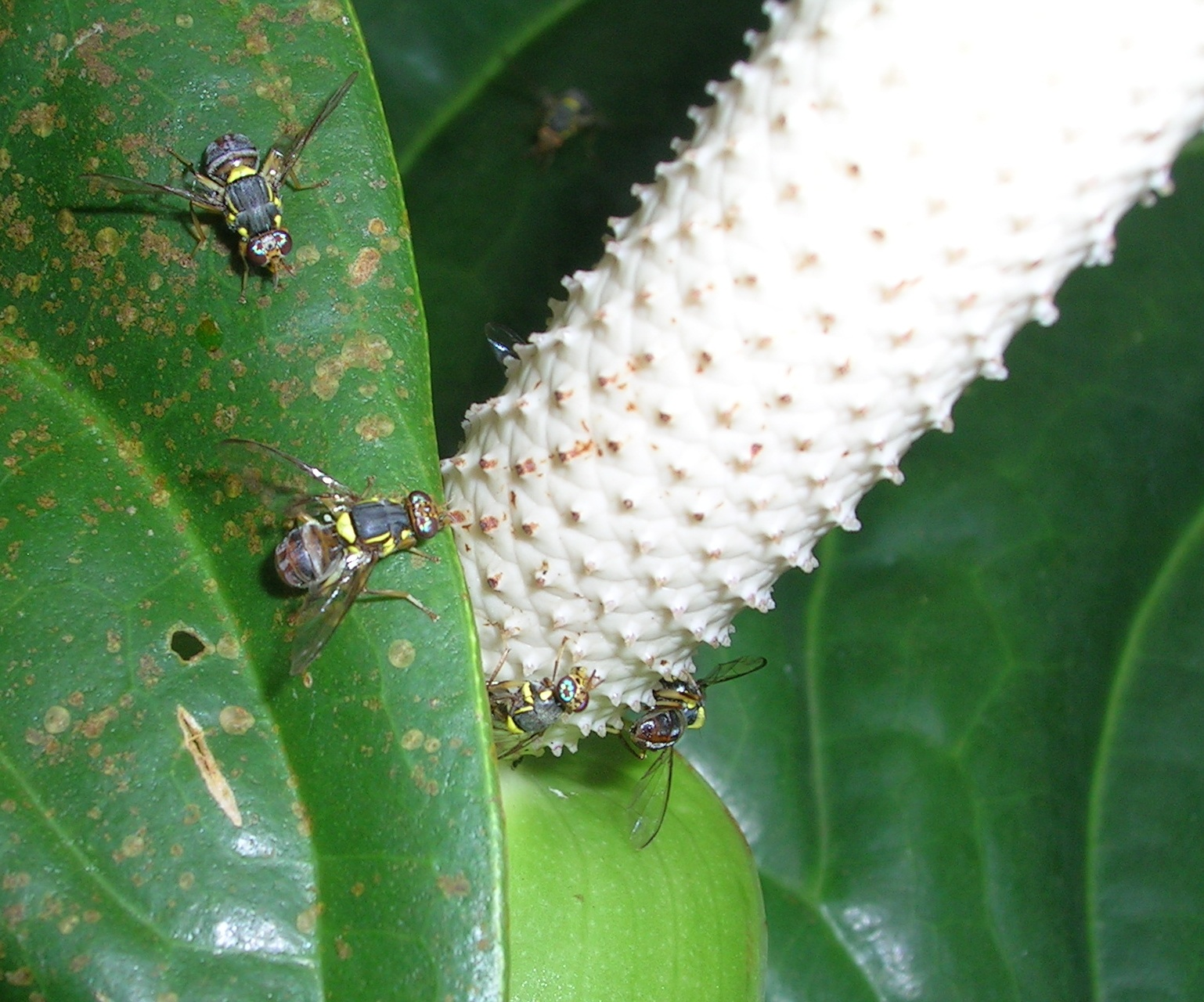
Bactrocera sp. flies on an Anthurium inflorescence smelling of methyl eugenol

== Systematics ==
Prior to the 1990s, almost all Dacini species were described in the genera Dacus or Strumeta. Bactrocera became the main genus for the tribe after Bactrocera and Dacus were split, but Bactrocera was further divided into Zeugodacus and Bactrocera in 2015. The subgeneric treatments have only partly adopted this latest change, but are indicated here to reflect the most modern – DNA based – insights.

Many subgenera are defined within this genus:

- Afrodacus
- Aglaodacus
- Apodacus
- Asiadacus
- Austrodacus
- Bactrocera
- Bulladacus
- Calodacus
- Daculus
- Diplodacus
- Gymnodacus
- Hemigymnodacus
- Heminotodacus
- Hemiparatridacus
- Hemisurstylus
- Hemizeugodacus
- Javadacus
- Melanodacus
- Neozeugodacus
- Nesodacus
- Niuginidacus
- Notodacus
- Papuodacus
- Paradacus
- Paratridacus
- Parazeugodacus
- Perkinsidacus
- Queenslandacus
- Semicallantra
- Sinodacus
- Tetradacus
- Trypetidacus

== See also ==
- List of Bactrocera species
