= Breeder (disambiguation) =

Breeder may refer to:

- Breeder, a person who practices the vocation of mating carefully selected specimens of the same breed
- Breeder (animal), an individual animal used for selective breeding
- Breeder reactor, a type of fast neutron reactor that produces more fissile material than it consumes
- Breeder (slang), a pejorative term used against heterosexuals, especially those who have many children
- Breeder (cellular automaton), a pattern in a cellular automaton which grows quadratically
- Breeder (film), a 2026 horror thriller film

Breeders may also refer to:

- The Breeders, an American rock band
- "Breeders", a song by Juliana Hatfield from the album Juliana's Pony: Total System Failure
- Breeders' Cup, an annual series of thoroughbred horse races
- Breeders (1986 film), an American science-fiction erotic horror film
- Breeders (1997 film), a British science fiction erotic horror film, a loose remake of the 1986 film
- Breeders (TV series), an American-British comedy series created by and starring Martin Freeman
- The Breeders, an alleged ecoterrorist organization, see 1989 California medfly attack

== See also ==
- Breed (disambiguation)
