= Breed (disambiguation) =

A breed is a group of domestic animals with a homogeneous appearance, behavior, and other characteristics that distinguish it from other animals of the same species.

Breed may also refer to:

- Breed (surname)
- "Breed" (song), a song by Nirvana on the album Nevermind
- Breed (video game), by Brat Designs
- Breed (comics), the title of two limited series of comic books, written and drawn by Jim Starlin
- Breed Motorcycle Club, an outlaw motorcycle club
- Half-breed, a White/Native American person
- In gay slang, anorectal ejaculation

== Places ==
- Breed, Wisconsin, United States, a town
  - Breed (community), Wisconsin, an unincorporated community
- Breeds, Essex, England

== See also ==
- Breeder (disambiguation)
- Breeding (disambiguation)
- The Breed (disambiguation)
