= Breed (surname) =

Breed is a surname. Notable people with the surname include:

- Alice Ives Breed (1853–1933), American social leader and clubwoman
- Andrews Breed (1794–1881), American businessman and politician
- Arthur H. Breed Sr. (1865–1953), American politician
- Charles B. Breed (1876–1958), American civil engineer and professor
- Clara Breed (1906–1994), American librarian
- Colin Breed (1947–2024), English politician
- Florence Breed (1875–1950), American political hostess and Bahá'í
- George Breed (1876–1956), American fencer
- Hiram N. Breed (1809– 1893), American cordwainer and politician
- Josh Breed (born 1999), South African cricketer
- Lawrence M. Breed (1940–2021), American computer scientist
- Levi Newton Breed (1831–1908), American politician
- London Breed (born 1974), American politician
- Mary Bidwell Breed (1870–1949), American chemist
- Michael Breed (born 1962), American golfer
- Mildred Breed (born 1947), American bridge player
- Robert Stanley Breed (1877–1956), American biologist
- Urban Breed (born 1970), Swedish singer
- William J. Breed (1928–2013), American geologist, paleontologist, naturalist and writer
