= 1962 in television =

The year 1962 involved some significant events in television. Below is a list of notable events of that year.

== Events ==
- January 1
  - The 1962 Rose Bowl game on NBC is the first coast-to-coast color television broadcast of a college football game in the United States.
  - NBC introduces the Laramie Peacock before a midnight showing of Laramie.
- February 14 – First Lady of the United States Jacqueline Kennedy takes television viewers on a tour of the White House.
- March 18 – "Un premier amour", sung by Isabelle Aubret, wins the Eurovision Song Contest 1962 (staged in Luxembourg) for France.
- March 24 – Benny Paret vs. Emile Griffith III: Boxer Benny Kid Paret falls unconscious at the hands of fellow boxer Emile Griffith during a boxing match telecast as ABC's Fight of the Week from Madison Square Garden (New York), officiated by Ruby Goldstein. Paret dies ten days later.
- April 16 – Walter Cronkite succeeds Douglas Edwards as anchorman of the CBS Evening News in the United States; he will remain so for the next 19 years.
- May 2 – Teledoce goes on air in Uruguay.
- May 27 – General Electric Theater airs its last episode on CBS.
- June 14 – BBC Television in the UK broadcasts the first episode of the sitcom Steptoe and Son, written by Galton and Simpson and starring Wilfrid Brambell and Harry H. Corbett, an unusual use at this time of "straight" actors in a sitcom. It will be remade for several international audiences.
- June 26 – Alfred Hitchcock Presents airs its last half-hour episode on NBC, before expanding to one hour on September 20 as The Alfred Hitchcock Hour on CBS.
- July 6 – Gay Byrne presents the first edition of The Late Late Show on RTÉ in Ireland. Byrne would present the show for 37 years, the longest period through which any individual has hosted a televised talk show anywhere in the world, and the show itself becomes the world's second longest-running talk show.
- July 11 (01:00 GMT) – First live transatlantic television transmission, via AT&T's Telstar 1 communications satellite (launched into orbit the previous day) and Goonhilly Satellite Earth Station, is received in the UK and broadcast by the BBC. An error at the ground station causes the initial images to be of poor quality. A full public broadcast is made on 23 July.
- July – DZTM-TV Channel 5, the seventh television station in the Philippines owned by Associated Broadcasting Corporation (modern-day TV5 Network) Filipino businessman and newspaper publisher Chino Roces, owner of The Manila Times, is launched after the success of radio station DZMT.
- August 5 – First broadcast of Saturday variety show Sábados Alegres in Chile; the program later becomes Sábado Gigante.
- August 24 – Indonesia begins the first television broadcast with the newly inaugurated TVRI, broadcast the opening ceremony of 1962 Asian Games. TVRI is the first national television network in Indonesia before 1989. The establishment of TVRI is marked as National Television Day.
- September 1 – Channel Television, the ITV franchise for the Channel Islands, goes on air.
- September 9 – WNYS-TV (later WSYR-TV) signs-on the air, giving Syracuse, New York, its first full-time ABC affiliate.
- September 14 – Wales West and North Television (Teledu Cymru) goes on air to the North and West Wales region, extending ITV to the whole of the UK.
- September 16 – WOKR-TV (later WHAM-TV) signs-on the air as an ABC-affiliate in Rochester, New York.
- September 26 – Malta Television (MTV) goes on the air as the first TV station in Malta.
- October 1 – Johnny Carson takes over as permanent host of NBC's The Tonight Show in the United States, a post he will hold for 30 years.
- October 22 – Cuban Missile Crisis: In a televised address, President of the United States John F. Kennedy announces the presence of Soviet missiles in Cuba and the U.S. naval blockade of the island.
- November 24 – The first episode of influential satire show That Was The Week That Was is broadcast live on BBC Television in the UK, presented by David Frost and produced by Ned Sherrin.
- Cigarette adverts are banned from children's programmes in the UK. Actors in these adverts now have to be over 21, and connection to social success is no longer allowed. The tobacco companies also start a policy of not advertising before 9pm.
- The U.S. All-Channel Receiver Act requires UHF tuners to be on all consumer sets (channels 14 through 83), as well as VHF.
- Zenith markets its first color TV, a 21" round screen set.

== Programs/programmes ==
- American Bandstand (1952–1989)
- Armchair Theatre (UK) (1956–1968)
- As the World Turns (1956–2010)
- Ben Casey (1961–1966)
- Blue Peter (UK) (1958–present)
- Bonanza (1959–1973)
- Bozo the Clown (1949–present)
- Candid Camera (1948–present)
- Captain Kangaroo (1955–1984)
- Car 54, Where Are You? (1961–1963)
- Come Dancing (UK) (1949–1995)
- Coronation Street (UK) (1960–present)
- Dennis the Menace (1959–1963)
- Dixon of Dock Green (UK) (1955–1976)
- Face the Nation (1954–present)
- Four Corners (Australia) (1961–present)
- Grandstand (UK) (1958–2007)
- Gunsmoke (1955–1975)
- Hallmark Hall of Fame (1951–present)
- Hawaiian Eye (1959–1963)
- Hazel (1961–1966)
- It's Academic (1961–present)
- Juke Box Jury (1959–1967, 1979, 1989–1990)
- Leave It to Beaver (1957–1963)
- Love of Life (1951–1980)
- Meet the Press (1947–present)
- Mister Ed (1961–1966)
- My Three Sons (1960–1972)
- Naked City (1958–1963)
- Opportunity Knocks (UK) (1956–1978)
- Panorama (UK) (1953–present)
- Perry Mason (1957–1966)
- Route 66 (1960–1964)
- Search for Tomorrow (1951–1986)
- The Adventures of Ozzie and Harriet (1952–1966)
- The Andy Griffith Show (1960–1968)
- The Avengers (UK) (1961–1969)
- The Bell Telephone Hour (1959–1968)
- The Dick Van Dyke Show (1961–1966)
- The Donna Reed Show (1958–1966)
- The Ed Sullivan Show (1948–1971)
- The Edge of Night (1956–1984)
- The Flintstones (1960–1966)
- The Fulton Sheen Program (1961–1968)
- The Good Old Days (UK) (1953–1983)
- The Guiding Light (1952–2009)
- The Jack Benny Show (1950–1965)
- The Lawrence Welk Show (1955–1982)
- The Lucy Show (1962–1968) (CBS)
- The Mike Douglas Show (1961–1981)
- The Milton Berle Show (1954–1967)
- The Price Is Right (1956–1965)
- The Real McCoys (1957–1963)
- The Secret Storm (1954–1974)
- The Sky at Night (UK) (1957–present)
- The Today Show (1952–present)
- The Tonight Show (1954–present)
- The Twilight Zone (1959–1964)
- The Untouchables (1959–1963)
- The Voice of Firestone (1949–1963)
- This Is Your Life (UK) (1955–2003)
- Truth or Consequences (1950–1988)
- Wagon Train (1957-1965)
- Walt Disney's Wonderful World of Color (1961–1969)
- What the Papers Say (UK) (1956–2008)
- What's My Line (1950–1967)
- Zoo Quest (UK) (1954–1964)

=== Debuts ===
- January 2 – Z-Cars (UK) on BBC Television (1962–1978)
- March 8 – Oh! Those Bells on CBS (1962)
- April 6 – Little Blue Light (Голубой огонёк, Goluboy ogonyok) in the Soviet Union (1962–present)
- April 17 – Brothers in Law (UK) on BBC Television (1962)
- July 6 – The Late Late Show (Ireland) on RTÉ (1962–present)
- July 26 - The Lively Ones on NBC (1962-1963)
- September 3 – The Hanna-Barbera New Cartoon Series on Syndication (1962–1963)
- September 19 – The Virginian on NBC, beginning a nine-year run, and is the first western to air in 90-minute installments (1962–1971)
- September 21 – Don't Call Me Charlie! on NBC (1962–1963)
- September 23 – Ensign O'Toole on NBC (1962–1963); The Jetsons on ABC, the first program to air in color on the network (1962–1963, 1984–1985, 1987)
- September 26 – The Beverly Hillbillies premieres on CBS (1962–1971)
- October 1 – The Lucy Show on CBS (1962–1968); The Tonight Show Starring Johnny Carson on NBC (1962–1992); Discovery on ABC (1962–1971)
- October 2 – Combat! on ABC (1962–1967)
- October 4 – The Saint (UK) on ITV (1962–1969)
- October 11 – McHale's Navy on ABC (1962–1966)
- December 10- Bonne Nuit les Petits on RTF (France) and Ici Radio-Canada Télé (Canada)
- December 31 – Match Game on NBC (1962–1969, 1973–1984, 1990–1991, 1998–1999, 2016–present)
- To Tell the Truth on CTV (1962–1964)

=== Ending this year ===
Date	Show	Debut
January 6	The Yogi Bear Show	1961
March 1	The New Bob Cummings Show	1961
March 13	Mess Mates	1960
March 25	Bus Stop	1961
April 4	Straightaway	1961
April 18	Top Cat	1961
May 10	Outlaws	1960
May 23	Window on Main Street	1961
May 25	Father of the Bride	1961
May 31	Oh! Those Bells	1962
June 5	Ichabod and Me	1961
September 12	The Alvin Show	1961
September 28	The Brighter Day	1954
Unknown	Alfred Hitchcock Presents	1955
Unknown	The Quick Draw McGraw Show	1959

== Births ==
Date	Name	Notability
January 4	Patrick Cassidy	Actor
January 5	Suzy Amis	Actress
January 7	Hallie Todd	Actress (Brothers, Lizzie McGuire)
January 10	Julie Moran	TV host
January 11	Kim Coles	Actress (In Living Color, Living Single)
January 13	Trace Adkins	Actor
January 17	Jim Carrey	Actor and comedian (In Living Color)
January 17	Denis O'Hare	Actor
January 17	Joseph C. Phillips	Actor (The Cosby Show, General Hospital)
January 19	Kelly Coffield Park	Actress and comedian (In Living Color)
January 20	Sophie Thompson	Actress
January 22	Tamra Davis	Director
January 28	Creflo Dollar	American televangelist
January 29	Nicholas Turturro	Actor (NYPD Blue)
January 30	Melanie Walters	Actress
February 4	Jim O'Heir	Actor (Parks and Recreation)
February 5	Armstrong Williams	Talk show host
February 7	Eddie Izzard	Actor
February 7	Guy Moon	Composer
February 8	John Shiban	Producer
February 12	Ali LeRoi	Actor
February 13	Michele Greene	Actress (L.A. Law)
February 15	Kurt McKinney	Actor (Guiding Light)
February 17	Lou Diamond Phillips	Actor (Longmire)
February 22	Steve Irwin	Wildlife educator (Croc Files, The Crocodile Hunter Diaries, The Crocodile Hunter) (died 2006)
February 27	Adam Baldwin	Actor (Chuck)
February 27	Grant Show	Actor
March 2	Jon Bon Jovi	Actor
March 3	Herschel Walker	American football player
March 8	Leon Robinson	Actor
March 10	Jasmine Guy	Actress, singer and dancer (A Different World)
March 10	Dan O'Shannon	Writer
March 11	Jeffrey Nordling	Actor (Once and Again, 24, Desperate Housewives)
March 11	Barbara Alyn Woods	Actress (One Tree Hill)
March 12	Titus Welliver	Actor (Lost, Bosch)
March 15	Jimmy Baio	Actor (Soap)
March 18	Thomas Ian Griffith	Actor (Another World, One Tree Hill, Cobra Kai) Producer (Grimm, Virgin River)
March 18	Mike Rowe	Host
March 18	Eileen Conn	American television producer
March 21	Matthew Broderick	Actor (2-time host of Saturday Night Live)
March 21	Rosie O'Donnell	Actress, comedian, talk show host (The Rosie O'Donnell Show)
March 22	Alex Berger	Producer
March 24	Star Jones	TV personality
March 25	Marcia Cross	Actress (Bree Van de Kamp on Desperate Housewives)
March 26	John Stockton	NBA basketball player
March 27	Vicki Gunvalson	TV personality
March 30	MC Hammer	Rapper
April 1	Phillip Schofield	English television presenter
April 2	Clark Gregg	Actor (Agents of S.H.I.E.L.D.)
April 6	Steven Levitan	Screenwriter
April 15	Tom Kane	Voice actor (The Angry Beavers, The Wild Thornberrys, The Powerpuff Girls, Kim Possible, Foster's Home for Imaginary Friends, The X's)
April 16	Mark Brazill	Stand-up comedian
April 16	Jason Scheff	Singer
April 17	Bill Kopp	Voice actor
April 26	Debra Wilson	Actress and comedian (Mad TV)
April 26	Kent Weed	American television director
April 27	James LeGros	Actor
May 2	Elizabeth Berridge	Actress (The John Larroquette Show)
May 2	Mitzi Kapture	Actress (Silk Stalkings)
May 4	Clare Wren	Actress (The Young Riders)
May 7	Simon Day	English comedian, actor, and screenwriter
May 13	Sean McDonough	Sportscaster
May 14	Michael Breed	Television host
May 17	Craig Ferguson	Actor and television host
May 17	Jane Moore	Television host
May 17	Jonathan Groff	Writer
May 24	Gene Anthony Ray	Actor, dancer, choreographer (Fame) (died 2003)
May 26	Genie Francis	Actress (General Hospital)
May 28	Michelle Collins	Actress (EastEnders, Coronation Street)
May 28	Brandon Cruz	Actor (The Courtship of Eddie's Father)
May 28	James Michael Tyler	Actor (died 2021)
June 5	Jeff Garlin	Actor and comedian (Curb Your Enthusiasm, The Goldbergs)
June 7	Lance Reddick	Actor (The Wire, Fringe) (died 2023)
June 10	Carolyn Hennesy	Soap opera actress (General Hospital)
June 10	Gina Gershon	Actress
June 12	Eamonn Walker	British actor (Oz, Chicago Fire)
June 13	Hannah Storm	Sports journalist
June 16	Joel Sartore	Speaker
June 19	Paula Abdul	Singer and choreographer (American Idol judge)
June 22	Stephen Chow	Hong Kong filmmaker, former actor and comedian
June 22	Clyde Drexler	NBA basketball player
June 27	Michael Ball	Actor
June 29	Amanda Donohoe	Actress (L.A. Law)
July 1	Andre Braugher	Actor (Homicide: Life on the Street, Brooklyn Nine-Nine) (died 2023)
July 3	Thomas Gibson	Actor (Chicago Hope, Dharma & Greg, Criminal Minds)
July 3	Tom Cruise	Actor (directed one episode of Fallen Angels and a guest on Top Gear)
July 6	Carolyn Omine	Writer
July 8	Rob Burnett	Executive producer of (Late Show with David Letterman)
July 12	Michael Jace	Actor
July 13	Tom Kenny	Voice actor and comedian (Rocko's Modern Life, Dexter's Laboratory, CatDog, The Powerpuff Girls, SpongeBob SquarePants, Johnny Bravo, The Fairly OddParents, Codename: Kids Next Door, Foster's Home for Imaginary Friends, Brandy & Mr. Whiskers, Camp Lazlo, My Gym Partner's a Monkey, Squirrel Boy, Handy Manny, Kick Buttowski: Suburban Daredevil, Adventure Time)
July 18	Jensen Buchanan	Actress (One Life to Live, Another World)
July 19	Anthony Edwards	Actor (Dr. Mark Greene on ER)
July 20	Carlos Alazraqui	Voice actor and comedian (Rocko's Modern Life, Hey Arnold!, Cow and Chicken, CatDog, Family Guy, Rocket Power, Detention, The Weekenders, The Fairly OddParents, ¡Mucha Lucha!, Reno 911!, Avatar: The Last Airbender, The Life and Times of Juniper Lee, Camp Lazlo, Squirrel Boy, The Replacements, Wow! Wow! Wubbzy!, El Tigre: The Adventures of Manny Rivera, Phineas and Ferb, The Loud House)
July 22	Alvin Robertson	NBA basketball player
July 23	Eriq La Salle	Actor (ER)
July 24	Thierry Frémont	Actor
July 24	Toshinobu Kubota	Japanese R&B singer and songwriter
July 25	Anthony Tyler Quinn	Actor (Boy Meets World)
July 29	Kevin Chapman	Actor (Rescue Me, Person of Interest)
July 29	Danielle Staub	American television personality
July 31	Wesley Snipes	Actor (White Men Can't Jump)
August 5	Patrick Ewing	NBA basketball player
August 6	Michelle Yeoh	Actress
August 13	John Slattery	Actor
August 15	David Zayas	Actor
August 16	Steve Carell	Actor and comedian (Michael Scott on The Office)
August 17	John Marshall Jones	Actor (Smart Guy)
August 19	Eric Lutes	Actor (Caroline in the City)
August 20	James Marsters	Actor (Buffy the Vampire Slayer, Angel)
August 20	Tammy Bruce	Radio host
August 24	Craig Kilborn	Comedian and host (The Daily Show)
August 24	Major Garrett	American journalist
August 24	David Koechner	Actor and comedian (Todd Packer on The Office)
August 27	Vic Mignogna	Actor (Dragon Ball, Fullmetal Alchemist, Full Metal Panic!)
August 27	Dean Devlin	Actor
August 28	David Fincher	Film director
August 28	David Zuckerman	TV producer
August 28	Craig Anton	Actor, comedian (Mad TV, Phil of the Future)
August 29	Ian James Corlett	Voice actor (ReBoot, Mega Man, Dinosaur Train)
August 29	Edward Allen Bernero	Producer
August 31	Dee Bradley Baker	Voice actor (Star Wars, Codename: Kids Next Door, Steven Universe, Phineas and Ferb, Ben 10)
August 31	Mark L. Walberg	Actor
September 2	Keir Starmer	British politician
September 6	Chris Christie	Politician and commentator (ABC News)
September 6	Elizabeth Vargas	Journalist (20/20)
September 8	Thomas Kretschmann	Actor
September 9	Troy Roberts	Journalist
September 11	Kristy McNichol	Actress (Family, Empty Nest)
September 12	Mary Kay Adams	Actress (Guiding Light, Babylon 5)
September 12	Amy Yasbeck	Actress (Wings)
September 14	Robert Herjavec	Television personality
September 15	Scott McNeil	Voice actor
September 15	Dina Lohan	TV star
September 16	Lori Stokes	Television journalist
September 17	Paul Feig	Actor (Sabrina the Teenage Witch)
September 17	Dustin Nguyen	Vietnamese-American actor (21 Jump Street, V.I.P.)
September 19	Cheri Oteri	Comic actress (Saturday Night Live)
September 21	Rob Morrow	Actor (Northern Exposure, Numb3rs)
September 21	Mark Holden	Actor (Deep State)
September 25	Beth Toussaint	Actress
September 25	Aida Turturro	Actress
September 26	Melissa Sue Anderson	Actress (Mary Ingalls on Little House on the Prairie)
September 30	Tony Morris	British newsreader (died 2020)
October 1	Esai Morales	Actor (NYPD Blue)
October 2	Jeff Bennett	Voice actor (Animaniacs, Gargoyles, Pinky and the Brain, Dexter's Laboratory, Mighty Ducks: The Animated Series, Johnny Bravo, 101 Dalmatians: The Series, Pepper Ann, Histeria!, The Powerpuff Girls, The Weekenders, Teamo Supremo, Kim Possible, The Adventures of Jimmy Neutron: Boy Genius, Ozzy & Drix, Codename: Kids Next Door, Teen Titans, Lilo & Stitch: The Series, Xiaolin Showdown, Dave the Barbarian, Foster's Home for Imaginary Friends, American Dragon: Jake Long, The Life and Times of Juniper Lee, The Buzz on Maggie, Camp Lazlo, The Emperor's New School, The Replacements, Curious George, Chowder, Transformers: Animated, The Marvelous Misadventures of Flapjack, The Penguins of Madagascar, Fanboy & Chum Chum, Kick Buttowski: Suburban Daredevil, Regular Show, T.U.F.F. Puppy, The Loud House)
October 11	Joan Cusack	Actress
October 12	Carlos Bernard	Actor (24)
October 13	Kelly Preston	Actress (d. 2020)
October 13	T'Keyah Crystal Keymáh	Actress (In Living Color, That's So Raven)
October 17	Mike Judge	Actor and director (Beavis and Butt-Head, King of the Hill)
October 19	Evander Holyfield	Professional boxer
October 19	David Labrava	Actor
October 22	Bob Odenkirk	Actor and comedian (Mr. Show with Bob and David, Breaking Bad)
October 26	Cary Elwes	Actor
November 9	Teryl Rothery	Actress
November 11	Demi Moore	Actress and model (General Hospital)
November 12	Mariella Frostrup	Presenter
November 14	Laura San Giacomo	Actress (Just Shoot Me!)
November 14	Harland Williams	Actor
November 18	Tim Guinee	Actor
November 19	Jodie Foster	Actress and director
November 27	Victoria Gotti	American television personality
November 28	Jon Stewart	Comedian and TV host (The Daily Show)
November 30	Stacey Sher	Producer
December 6	Janine Turner	Actress (Northern Exposure)
December 9	Felicity Huffman	Actress (Desperate Housewives)
December 9	Leslie Carrara-Rudolph	Actress
December 11	Paul Haslinger	Composer
December 13	David A. Goodman	Writer
December 17	Richard Jewell	Notable victim of a trial by media (died 2007)
December 18	Maiya Williams	Writer
December 19	Jill Talley	Voice actress (SpongeBob SquarePants, The Boondocks, Camp Lazlo, The Loud House)
December 15	Dean Cameron	Actor
December 22	Ralph Fiennes	English actor
December 31	Don Diamont	Actor (The Young and the Restless, The Bold and the Beautiful)

== Deaths ==
Date	Name	Age	Notability
January 13	Ernie Kovacs	42	Comic actor, director, writer, composer
February 27	Willie Best	45	Actor
March 1	Roscoe Ates	67	Actor
June 19	Will Wright	68	Actor
July 30	Myron McCormick	54	Stage, radio, and film actor
August 4	Marilyn Monroe	36	Actress and sex symbol
October 2	Frank Lovejoy	50	Actor
October 26	Louise Beavers	60	Actress
December 16	Lew Landers	61	Director
December 17	Thomas Mitchell	70	Actor

== Television debuts ==
- Ursula Andress – Thriller
- Tim Conway – McHale's Navy
- Dom DeLuise – The Shari Lewis Show
- Olympia Dukakis – Dr. Kildare
- Peter Fonda – Naked City
- George Furth – Going My Way
- Sid Haig – The Untouchables
- Clint Howard – The Andy Griffith Show
- Lainie Kazan – Car 54, Where Are You?
- Mako – The Lloyd Bridges Show
- Charles Nelson Reilly – Car 54, Where Are You?
- Barry Primus – The Defenders
- Kurt Russell – Dennis the Menace
- Tom Skerritt – Combat!
- Donald Sutherland – Man of the World

== See also ==
- 1962–63 United States network television schedule
