= Birthing people =

Birthing people may refer to:

== People ==
- Childbirth § associated occupations, a collective term for all physicians, midwives, doctors, nurses, doulas, or others assisting with birth; used most commonly from the 1980s through 2000s
- Mothers, exclusively to birth mothers and not adoptive mothers
- Transmasculine people who don't identify as women or mothers but can become pregnant, see Transgender pregnancy

== Religion ==
- Creation myths may involve spiritual entities such as a mother goddess birthing people into the world.

== See also ==
- Breeder (slang)
- Menstruation § Terminology; section discusses gender-neutral language similar to one sense of "birthing people"
- Mother (disambiguation)
- Obstetric medicine
- Women
