= Brood sow =

Brood sow may refer to the following:

- a female pig used for breeding
- a pejorative term for a child-rearing woman, along similar lines to 'breeder'
