= Intraspecific breeding =

Intraspecific breeding is sexual reproduction within a species. It can refer to:

- Selective breeding of plants or animals by humans, to choose desirable traits
- Hybridization, when both parents are members of the same species

== See also ==
- Breeding (disambiguation)
