= Offspring =

Product of reproduction of an organism

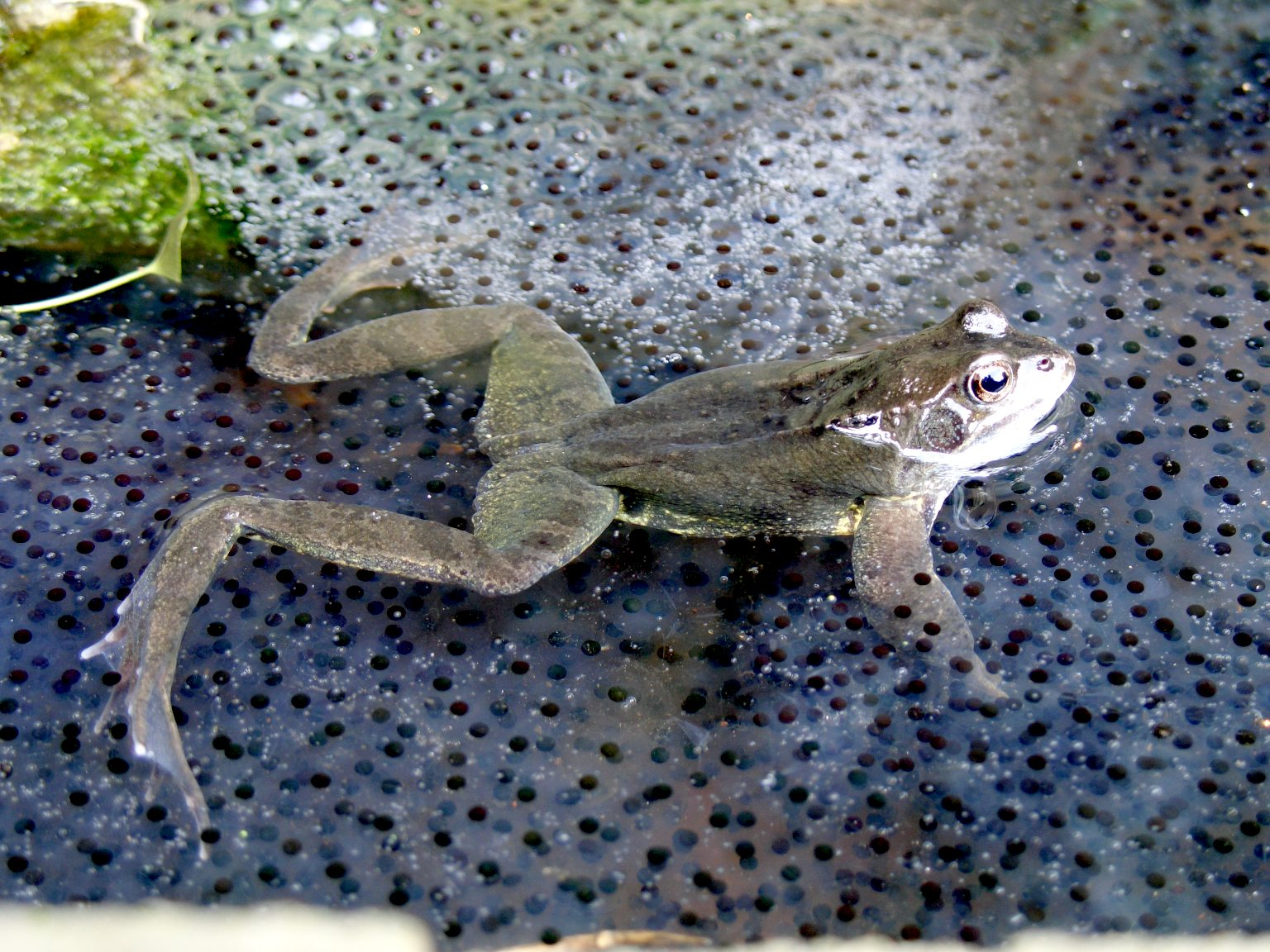
A frog in frogspawn

In biology, offspring (/ˈɒfsprɪŋ/) are the young creation of living organisms, produced either by sexual or asexual reproduction. Collective offspring may be known as a brood or progeny. This can refer to a set of simultaneous offspring, such as the chicks hatched from one clutch of eggs, or to all offspring produced over time, as with the honeybee. Offspring can occur after mating, artificial insemination, or as a result of cloning.

Human offspring (descendants) are referred to as children; male children are sons and female children are daughters (see Kinship).

== Overview ==
Offspring contains many parts and properties that are precise and accurate in what they consist of, and what they define. The offspring of a new species, also known as a child or F1 generation, consists of genes of the father and the mother, which is also known as the parent generation. Each of these offspring contains numerous genes which have coding for specific tasks and properties. Males and females both contribute equally to the genotypes of their offspring, in which gametes fuse and form. An important aspect of the formation of the parent offspring is the chromosome, which is a structure of DNA which contains many genes.

To focus more on the offspring and how it results in the formation of the f1 generation, is an inheritance called sex linkage, which is a gene located on the sex chromosome, and patterns of this inheritance differ in both male and female. The explanation that proves the theory of the offspring having genes from both parent generations is proven through a process called crossing over, which consists of taking genes from the male chromosomes and genes from the female chromosome, resulting in a process of meiosis occurring, and leading to the splitting of the chromosomes evenly. Depending on which genes are dominantly expressed in the gene will result in the sex of the offspring. The female will always give an X chromosome, whereas the male, depending on the situation, will either give an X chromosome or a Y chromosome. If a male offspring is produced, the gene will consist of an X and a Y chromosome, and if a female offspring is produced, the gene will consist of two X chromosomes.

Cloning is the production of an offspring which represents the identical genes to its parent. Reproductive cloning begins with the removal of the nucleus from an egg, which holds the genetic material. In order to clone an organ, a stem cell is to be produced and then utilized to clone that specific organ. A common misconception of cloning is that it produces an exact copy of the parent being cloned. Cloning copies the DNA/genes of the parent and then creates a genetic duplicate. The clone will not be a similar copy as they will grow up in different surroundings from the parent and may encounter different opportunities and experiences that can result in epigenetic changes. Although mostly positive, cloning also faces some setbacks in terms of ethics and human health. Though cell division and DNA replication is a vital part of survival, there are many steps involved and mutations can occur with permanent change in an organism's and their offspring's DNA. Some mutations can be good as they result in random evolution periods which may be good for the species, but most mutations are bad as they can change the genotypes of offspring, which can result in changes that harm the species.

== See also ==
- Breeding (disambiguation)
- Family
- Infanticide (zoology)
- Litter
- Parent–offspring conflict
- Parental investment
- Patrilineality
