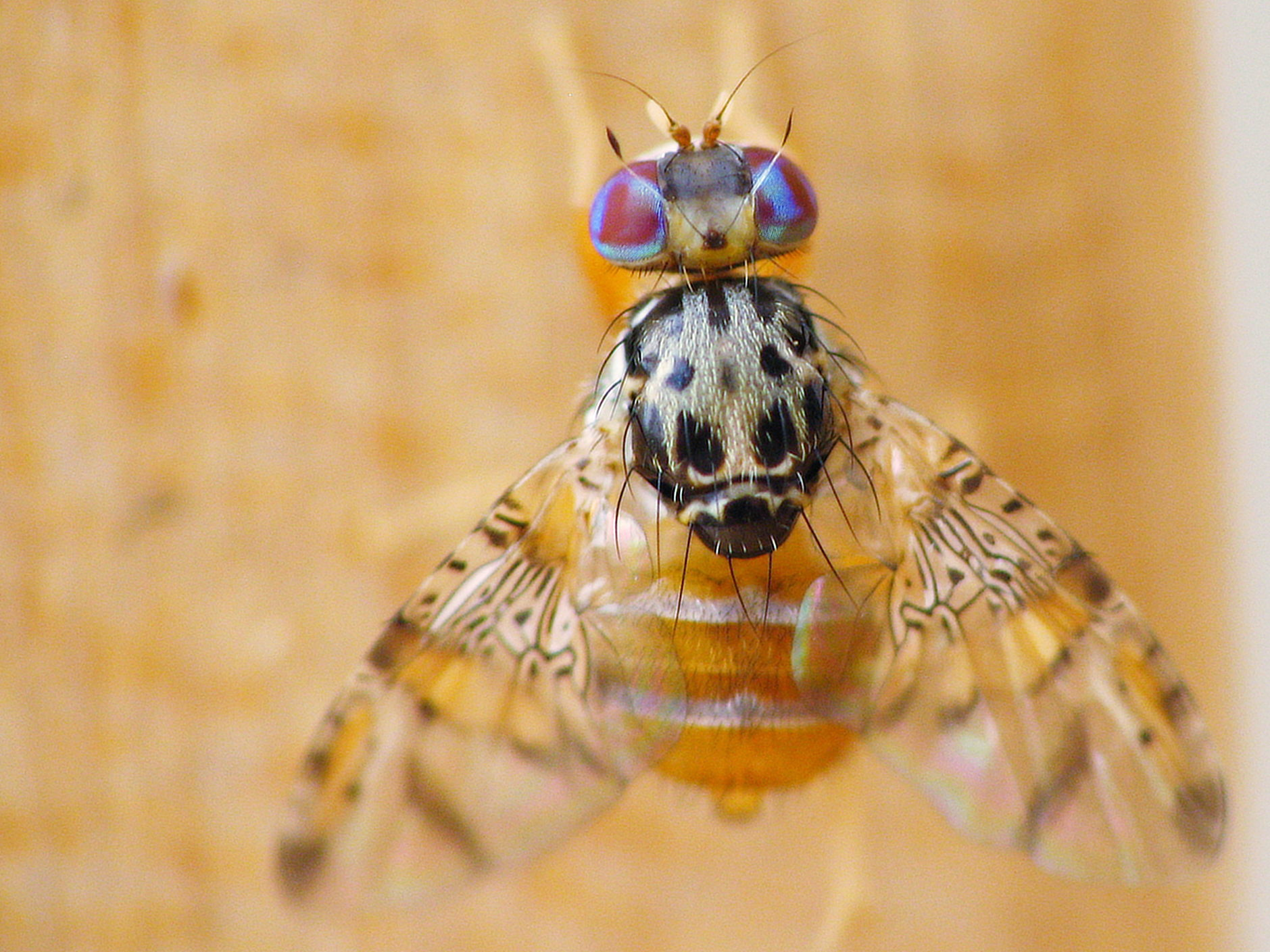
- Ceratitis capitata

Scientific classification
- Kingdom: Animalia
- Phylum: Arthropoda
- Clade: Pancrustacea
- Class: Insecta
- Order: Diptera
- Family: Tephritidae
- Subfamily: Dacinae
- Tribe: Ceratidini
- Genus: Ceratitis; Macleay, 1829

= Ceratitis =

Genus of flies

Ceratitis is a genus of tephritid fruit flies with about 80 species. One of the best known species is Ceratitis capitata, the Mediterranean fruit fly.

The genus contains several subgenera:

- Acropteromma [in some schemes as own genus]
- Ceratalaspis
- Ceratitis
- Hoplolophomyia
- Pardalaspis
- Pterandrus

== Species ==
=== Subgenus Acropteromma ===
- Ceratitis munroana (Bezzi, 1926) –

(see some as alternative spelling Ceratitis munroanum, elsewhere as protonym Acropteromma munroanum)

=== Subgenus Ceratalaspis ===
- Ceratitis aliena (Bezzi, 1920) –
- Ceratitis andranotobaka Hancock, 1984 –
- Ceratitis antistictica Bezzi, 1913 – (Per Meyer 1998, contra scheme on some websites)
- Ceratitis argenteobrunnea Munro, 1935 –
- Ceratitis brucei Munro, 1935 –
- Ceratitis connexa (Bezzi, 1926) –
- Ceratitis contramedia (Munro, 1937) –
- Ceratitis cosyra (Walker, 1849) –
- Ceratitis discussa Munro, 1935 –
- Ceratitis divaricata (Munro, 1933) –
- Ceratitis dumeti Munro, 1933 –
- Ceratitis ealensis Meyer & Copeland, 2005 –
- Ceratitis epixantha (Hering, 1941) –
- Ceratitis flavipennata Meyer & Virgilio, 2016 –
- Ceratitis giffardi Bezzi, 1912 – (But see Meyer, 1998 as uncertainty if a junior synonym of Ceratitis cosyra).
- Ceratitis grahami Munro, 1935 –
- Ceratitis guttiformis Munro, 1935 –
- Ceratitis hancocki Meyer, 1998 –
- Ceratitis lentigera Munro, 1933 –
- Ceratitis lineata (Hering, 1938) – (But see Meyer, 1998 with doubts over minor differences from Ceratitis striatella).
- Ceratitis lunata Munro, 1935 –
- Ceratitis marriotti Munro, 1933 –
- Ceratitis mlimaensis Meyer, 1998 –
- Ceratitis morstatti Bezzi, 1912 –
- Ceratitis nana Munro, 1933 –
- Ceratitis neostictica Meyer, 1998 –
- Ceratitis oraria Meyer & Copeland, 2005 –
- Ceratitis ovalis Munro, 1935 –
- Ceratitis pallidula Meyer, Mwatawala & Virgilio, 2016 –
- Ceratitis paradumeti Meyer, 1998 –
- Ceratitis perisae Meyer & Copeland, 2005 –
- Ceratitis perseus Meyer & Copeland, 2005 –

(for Ceratitis pycnanthi (Ghesquière, 1942) see as synonym under Ceratitis striatella per Meyer, 1998)

- Ceratitis quinaria (Bezzi, 1918) –
- Ceratitis sarcocephali (Bezzi, 1924) – . (But see Meyer, 1998 as uncertainty if a junior synonym of Ceratitis cosyra).
- Ceratitis sawahilensis Meyer & Virgilio, 2016 –
- Ceratitis scaevolae (Munro, 1929) –
- Ceratitis silvestrii Bezzi, 1912 –
- Ceratitis simi Munro, 1933 –
- Ceratitis stictica Bezzii, 1909 –
- Ceratitis striatella (Munro, 1935) –
- Ceratitis sucini Meyer, 1998 –
- Ceratitis taitaensis Meyer & Copeland, 2016 –
- Ceratitis turneri (Munro, 1937) –
- Ceratitis venusta (Munro, 1956) –
- Ceratitis whartoni Meyer & Copeland, 2009 –

=== Subgenus Ceratitis ===
- Ceratitis brachychaeta Freidberg, 1991 –
- Ceratitis caetrata Munro, 1949 –
- Ceratitis capitata (Wiedemann, 1824) –
- Ceratitis catoirii Guérin-Méneville, 1843 –
- Ceratitis cornuta (Bezzi, 1924) –
- Ceratitis malgassa Munro, 1939 –
- Ceratitis manjakatompo Hancock, 1984 –
- Ceratitis pinax Munro, 1933 –

(note for Ceratitis antistictica see subgenus Ceratalaspis).

=== Subgenus Hoplolophomyia ===
- Ceratitis cristata (Bezzi, 1920) –

=== Subgenus Pardalaspis ===
- Ceratitis bremii Guérin-Méneville, 1843 –
- Ceratitis cuthbertsoni (Munro, 1936) –
- Ceratitis ditissima (Munro, 1938) –
- Ceratitis edwardsi (Munro, 1957) –
- Ceratitis hamata Meyer, 1996 –
- Ceratitis millicentae Meyer & Copeland, 2005 –
- Ceratitis munroi Meyer, 1996 –
- Ceratitis punctata (Wiedemann, 1824) –
- Ceratitis semipunctata Meyer, 1996 –
- Ceratitis serrata Meyer, 1996 –
- Ceratitis zairensis Meyer, 1996 –

=== Subgenus Pterandrus ===
- Ceratitis acicularis (Munro, 1969) –
- Ceratitis anonae Graham, 1908 – [FARQ complex]
- Ceratitis argenteostriata Meyer & Freidberg, 2006 –
- Ceratitis barbata Meyer & Freidberg, 2006 –
- Ceratitis bicincta Enderlein, 1920 – (see also under Trirhithrum bicinctum (Enderlein, 1920)).
- Ceratitis chirinda (Hancock, 1985) – [See Neoceratitis chirinda in Norrbom et al., 1999]
- Ceratitis colae Silvestri, 1913 –
- Ceratitis copelandi Meyer & Freidberg, 2006 –
- Ceratitis curvata (Munro, 1937) –
- Ceratitis faceta Enderlein, 1920 – (see also under Trirhithrum facetum (Enderlein, 1920)) –
- Ceratitis fasciventris (Bezzi, 1920) – [not in Norrbom 1999] [FARQ complex]
- Ceratitis flexuosa (Walker, 1853) –
- Ceratitis fulicoides (Munro, 1943) –
- Ceratitis gravinotata (Munro, 1937) –
- Ceratitis inauratipes (Munro, 1933) – (see also under Trirhithrum inauratipes Munro, 1933
- Ceratitis lepida (Munro, 1969) –
- Ceratitis lobata Munro, 1933 –
- Ceratitis melanopus (Hering, 1942) –
- Ceratitis nigricornis Meyer & Freidberg, 2006 –
- Ceratitis obtusicuspis Meyer & Freidberg, 2006 –
- Ceratitis paracolae Meyer & Freidberg, 2006 –
- Ceratitis pedestris (Bezzi, 1924) –
- Ceratitis penicillata (Bigot, 1891 –
- Ceratitis pennitibialis Meyer & Freidberg, 2006 –
- Ceratitis pinnatifemur Enderlein, 1920 –
- Ceratitis podocarpi (Bezzi, 1924) –
- Ceratitis querita (Munro, 1937) – (see also under Trirhithrum queritum Munro, 1937).
- Ceratitis quilicii Meyer, Mwatawala & Virgilio, 2016 – [FARQ complex]
- Ceratitis rosa Karsch, 1887 [FARQ complex]
- Ceratitis roubaudi (Bezzi, 1923) –
- Ceratitis rubivora (Coquillett, 1901 –
- Ceratitis stipula Meyer & Freidberg, 2006 –
- Ceratitis tananarivana Hancock, 1984 –
- Ceratitis tripteris (Munro, 1957) –
- Ceratitis whitei Meyer & Freidberg, 2006 –
