= Ceratitis penicillata =

Scientific classification
- Kingdom: Animalia
- Phylum: Arthropoda
- Class: Insecta
- Order: Diptera
- Family: Tephritidae
- Genus: Ceratitis
- Species: C. penicillata

Binomial name
- Ceratitis penicillata Bigot, 1891

Species of fly

Ceratitis penicillata is a species of fruit fly from the family Tephritidae.
