= Ceratitis ovalis =

Scientific classification
- Kingdom: Animalia
- Phylum: Arthropoda
- Clade: Pancrustacea
- Class: Insecta
- Order: Diptera
- Family: Tephritidae
- Genus: Ceratitis
- Species: C. ovalis

Binomial name
- Ceratitis ovalis Munro, 1935

Species of fly

Ceratitis ovalis is a species of tephritid or fruit flies in the family Tephritidae. It is known from Sierra Leone.
