= Ceratitis rosa =

Scientific classification
- Kingdom: Animalia
- Phylum: Arthropoda
- Class: Insecta
- Order: Diptera
- Family: Tephritidae
- Genus: Ceratitis
- Species: C. rosa

Binomial name
- Ceratitis rosa Karsch, 1887

Species of fly

Ceratitis rosa, the Natal fruit fly, is an African fruit fly species from the family Tephritidae. It is considered a pest in both its native and non-native habitats. It prefers subtropical or temperate climates and the fruits that are native to these areas. It is also capable of surviving in less dry climates compared to its relative Ceratitis capitata, which is more specific in its habitat preferences. Ceratitis rosa was first described by Karsch in 1887 in Delagoa Bay, Mozambique. Soon after, in 1900, the Natal fruit fly was a recognized as a pest of orchards and fruit farmers throughout KwaZulu Natal Province, Republic of South Africa.

== Taxonomy ==
Ceratitis rosa is also referred to as Ceratitis (Pterandrus) rosa within a subgenus. Within this, some African species have been further grouped as the 'FAR complex' or later the FARQ complex. These include [F] Ceratitis fasciventris, [A] Ceratitis anonae, [R] Ceratitis rosa and [Q] Ceratitis quilicii. The males can be differentiated based on the sexual secondary characteristics of the legs, but females need molecular separation (based on their DNA) to provide a confirmed species identification. It is also important to note that up until 2016 Ceratitis rosa and Ceratitis quilicii were identified as the same species. All literature regarding Ceratitis rosa predating 2016 can therefore be referencing both of these species.

== Morphology ==
The legs are yellow in color unless otherwise noted, the setation is mostly pale. The femur does not have any bushy feathering posteriorly, however there are only dispersed rows of long black setulae posterodorsal, posteroventral shorter and pale, ventral setae black. The midportion of the femur with few dispersed pale setulae ventrally; tibia moderately broadened; anteriorly black with conspicuous silvery shine when viewed from certain angle on distal 0.66 to 0.75 (black color sometimes inconspicuous in teneral specimens but silvery shine is always present) and reaching ventral and dorsal margins of tibia throughout the full length. There is black feathering dorsally along distal 0.75 and ventrally along distal 0.66, occasionally to distal 0.75. The hind leg femur is apical 0.25 with longer setulae dorsally and ventrally.

The wings have bands that are yellowish-brown in color. There is an interruption between marginal and discal bands near vein R1 Clear and complete; cubital band free; medial band absent; and cross vein R-M opposite middle of discal cell. Apex of vein R1 distal to level of cross vein R-M. Crossvein DM-Cu oblique anterobasal. The abdomen is mostly yellow in color. The tergites (dorsal plates of the exoskeleton) 2 and 4 have a pale-gray band on the posterior half, and the anterior margin sometimes with a brownish color. The posterior half of tergite 3 has patches of brown coloration posteriorly and has a more yellow-brown color on the anterior half. Tergite 5 with basal half brownish, sometimes divided medially into two spots. Body length: 4.96 (4.25-5.30) mm; wing length: 5.34 (4.50-5.75) mm.

=== Males ===
The antennae are yellowish orange in color. The arista (bristles on the antenna) is short to moderately long, with the length increasing as you reach the bottom of the antenna. The face is yellowish white, with the frons (upper portion of face) being yellow with short, scattered bristle-like structures distinctly darker than the frons and face. The thorax's exoskeleton is yellowish and white like the head. There is no spot. The scutum (part of the exoskeleton) has a grayish-brown color sometimes with an orange tint. It has streaks and darker markings, however there are no distinct spots except where the precellular white markings separate. The scapular setae (specialized hairs found on the back) are dark in color. The scutellum (middle triangular portion of thorax) is also yellow-white in color and is usually separated with two darker spots.

=== Female ===
The end of the antennae is yellow orange in color. The anepisternum (located on the thorax) rarely has a darker setula. The legs do not have any feathering; however, the fore femur may have short dark bristles. The basal part of the ovipositor of some species of insects, typically the non-retractile sheath that remains exposed when the ovipositor is withdrawn and not in action, and is shorter than the pre abdomen, The aculeus (short needle like structure) is at least six times longer than it is wide, with a distinct apical indentation and lateral margin.

== Distribution ==
Ceratitis rosa is native to southern Africa, specifically the Eastern coast. The genus Ceratitis belongs to the subtribe Ceratitidina (tribe Dacini) which is an Afrotropical group. Within its native habitat, the natal fruit fly has an allopatric distribution, which are species occurring in separate non-overlapping geographical areas. The northern point of their habitat is the coastal areas of Kenya. The southern parts of their range include South Africa. The records of these ranges may be unreliable, as records from these countries list the natal fruit fly under a different scientific name. Certain parts of Africa refer to the natal fruit fly by different names. This makes determining the accurate range of the native habitat more difficult. The most predicted cause of invasion is tropical fruit export and tourist travel. Ceratitis rosa lay their eggs in these fruits and vegetables. These are transported internationally illegally/accidentally, as it is difficult to identify and detect contaminated food. This causes the new population to grow quickly in the new area. The other large cause of invasion is the accidental introduction of Ceratitis rosa through transportation of commercial shipments or luggage of individual passengers of infested fruits. The fruit fly can lay up to 500 eggs at a time, laid within fruits and the larvae develop inside the fruit and when matured, the larvae leave the fruits and pupate in the soil.

== Host ==
The relationship between the Ceratitis rosa and the host is parasitic, which usually benefits the symbiont while harming the host in some way and having a higher reproductive potential than the host when it comes into contact with agriculture and human health. The larval development can also take place in other parts of the host plant including flowers, seeds, and stems.

== Ecological impact ==
Ceratitis rosa is a polyphagous African species, which is an animal able to feed on various kinds of food. Its known distribution is Southern and Eastern Africa. It is considered a major pest of several commercial fruits, including fruits grown in subtropical or temperate environments. It has similar environmental requirements to Ceratitis capitata except that it can withstand fewer dry conditions. The natal fruit fly is considered a potentially invasive species in other parts of Africa, as well as other parts of the world. The pathway of dispersal and introduction is as larvae in infested fruits with commercial shipments or in the luggage of travelers. Ceratitis rosa is of quarantine significance for the European and Mediterranean Plant Protection Organization (EPPO) and Organismo Internacional Regional de Sanidad Agropecuaria (OIRSA), which are all organizations that specialize in limiting the impact of pests invading nonnative areas.

== Control methods ==
Ceratitis rosa can be monitored by traps baited with male lures as members of subgenera Ceratitis and Pterndrus are attracted to trimedlure and terpinyl acetate, as well as enriched ginger oil in efforts to lure and trap them. Pheromone based trapping systems are a technique used to attract and target organisms using chemical signals, which mimic the natural signals emitted by the targeted species. Consignments of potential host fruits from countries where Ceratitis rosa occurs should be inspected for symptoms of infestation and those suspected should be cut open to look for larvae. It is recommended that such fruits should come from an area where Ceratitis rosa does not occur, or from a place of production found free from the pest by regular inspection for three months before harvest. By analogy with Ceratitis capitata, fruits may also be treated in transit by cold treatment or, for certain types of fruits, through vapor heat. Plants of host species transported with roots from countries where Ceratitis rosa occurs should be free from soil, or the soil should be treated against puparia, the stage between the larva and the imago. The plants should not carry fruits. The importation of such plants may be prohibited. All fallen and infected fruit should be destroyed, and insecticidal protection should be sprayed on the crops for prevention and elimination of Ceratitis rosa.
