= Ceratitis podocarpi =

Scientific classification
- Kingdom: Animalia
- Phylum: Arthropoda
- Clade: Pancrustacea
- Class: Insecta
- Order: Diptera
- Family: Tephritidae
- Genus: Ceratitis
- Species: C. podocarpi

Binomial name
- Ceratitis podocarpi (Bezzi, 1924)

Species of fly

Ceratitis podocarpi is a species of fruit fly in the family Tephritidae. It is a pest of various cultivated species of Cucurbitaceae, especially the pumpkin, squash and melon. Ceratitis podocarpi is found in almost all Southern African countries like Ethiopia, Kenya, South Africa.
