= 1989 California medfly attack =

Bioterrorism incident in California, United States

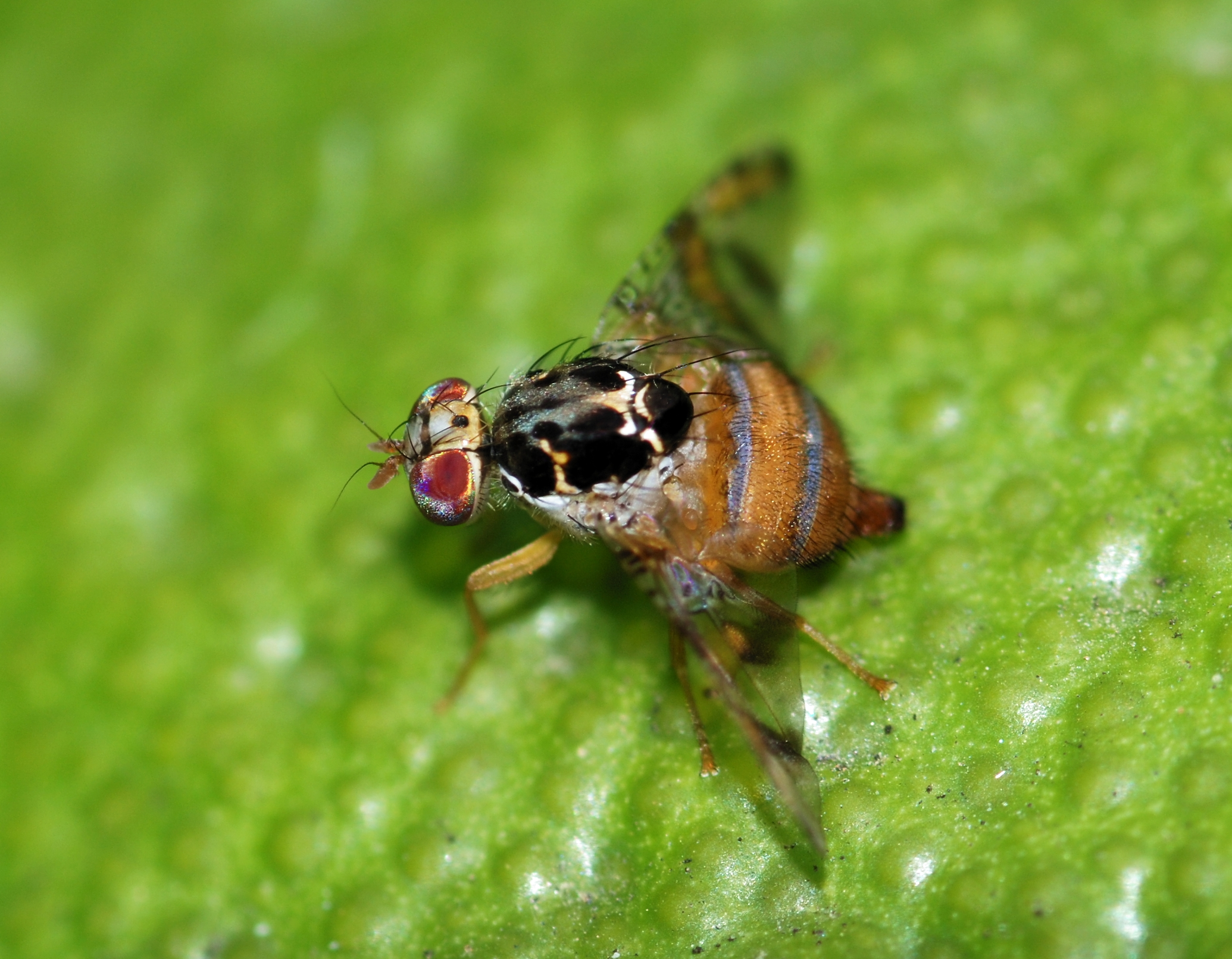
- A female Mediterranean fruit fly (Ceratitis capitata)
- Location: Southern California (Los Angeles area)
- Date: July 1989–November 1990
- Target: California Agriculture/Malathion spraying program
- Attack type: Ecotage, Agro-terrorism, Ecoterrorism
- Weapon: Medflies
- Deaths: 0
- Injuries: 0
- Perpetrator: Unknown
- Motive: Unknown

In 1989, a sudden invasion of Mediterranean fruit flies (Ceratitis capitata, "medflies") appeared in the US state of California and began devastating crops. Scientists were puzzled and said that the sudden appearance of the insects "defies logic", and some speculated "biological terrorists" were responsible. Analysis suggested that an outside hand played a role in the dense infestation.

A person or group calling itself "The Breeders" took responsibility for the bioterrorist attack, as financial retaliation for the environmental damage caused by the state's Malathion aerial spraying; the group's members were never identified. Subsequently, three months after "The Breeders" announced the medfly release, the state ended its decade-long Malathion program and sought alternate ways to handle destructive insects.

== Background ==
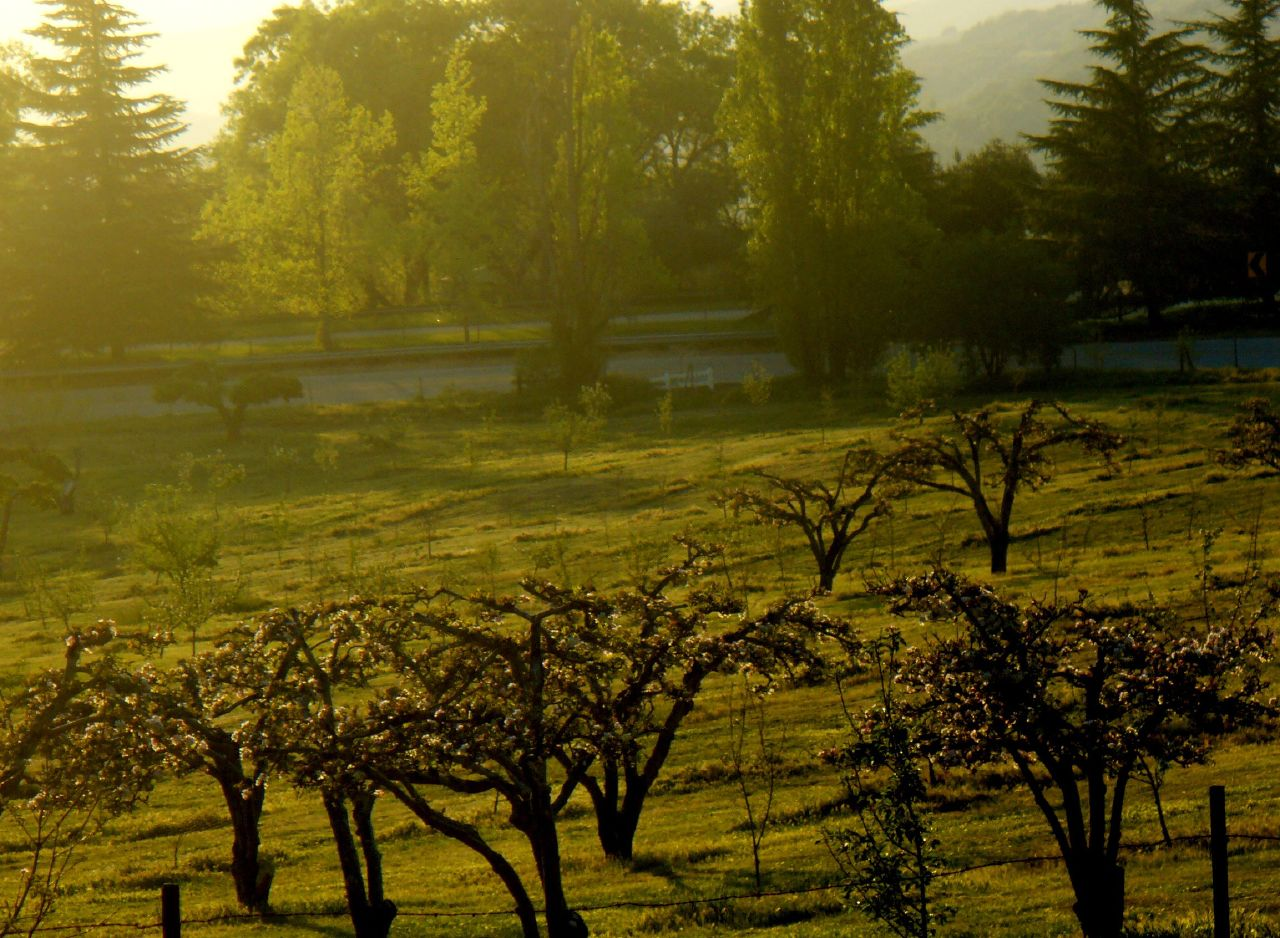
Agricultural orchard in California

Largely because of its sunny Mediterranean climate and widespread irrigation, California is the world's fifth largest supplier of food and agriculture commodities. According to the California Department of Food and Agriculture, "California agriculture is nearly a $36.6 billion dollar industry that generates $100 billion in related economic activity." The state’s agricultural sales first exceeded $30 billion in 2004. Since 1975, California had seen small annual infestations of the medfly, typically ascribing their appearance to the casual shipping of fruit, and visits, between relatives and friends in California and Hawaii.

Medflies breed rapidly and eat fruit with a voracious appetite. Notably, they represent a risk to 22 crops in California, including apples, apricots, avocados, bell peppers, cherries, dates, figs, grapes, grapefruits, kiwis, limes, mandarin oranges, nectarines, olives, oranges, peaches, pears, persimmons, plums, prunes and tomatoes.

Medfly infestations are not without precedent, both in California and elsewhere in North America. Between 1975 and 1993 the state of California spent more than $170 million on medfly eradication programs meant to contain 12 different infestations. In 1996 the state began utilizing sterile medflies in its eradication program and between 1996 and 2007 the state experienced five infestations. A major 1981 medfly infestation cost California $40 million by itself. The 1981 infestation turned into a political crisis and led to the beginning of the state's aerial spraying program in July of that year. Medflies were found in traps as late as 2007 in Solano County, California. The first medflies in Florida turned up in 1929 and they have been a constant threat to the citrus crop there ever since. Medfly sightings occurred in Florida in 1997 and 2010.

== Attack ==
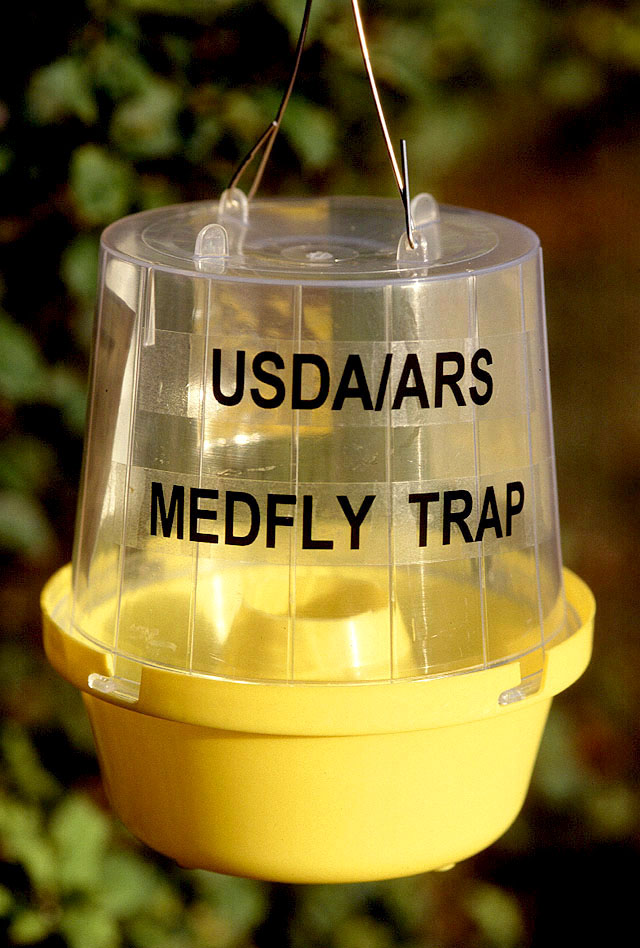
A newer model of medfly trap that uses three chemical attractants, rather than one

Beginning in 1975, when medflies were first seen in the area, California deployed small McPhail insect traps to attract and capture the medflies to help measure the estimated population. In 1989, as many flies were captured as had been captured in the previous fifteen years combined. The greatest concentration of medflies were found in Orange County and within a triangle linking the eastern edge of the Los Angeles Basin with San Bernardino and Riverside County.

On December 8, 1989, the state retreated from its position that the 12 outbreaks since August each represented "isolated infestations" that could be easily eradicated after a panel of scientific advisers suggested it was not possible. It was instead ordered that, rather than one or two aerial applications of the infected communities, more than a dozen sprayings would be necessary over a period of months. In addition, Malathion was no longer used alone, but mixed in a four-to-one ratio with Nu-Lure bait to attract insects to the area.

The period of infestation stretched from July 1989 through November 1990. In the years since medflies were discovered in California, an average of $26 million was spent annually to control them; but 1989's attack was estimated to have cost $60 million in eradication efforts, making 1989 the second-most expensive year in the state's program. It is not clear whether the $60 million was the total cost, or only represented California's half of a possible $120 million cost, as half the costs were borne by the United States Department of Agriculture.

== Claim of responsibility ==
"State officials have probably noticed an increase as well as an unusual distribution of Medfly infestation in Los Angeles County since March, 1989...

— Letter of responsibility

In December 1989, a two-page letter addressing Mayor of Los Angeles Tom Bradley was sent to the Los Angeles Times and The Fresno Bee ostensibly from an "ecoterrorist organization" calling itself "The Breeders". The Breeders claimed that it was responsible for the summer release of the medflies as retaliation for the environmental damage caused by the Malathion aerial application by the state. It also threatened to expand its medfly infestation into the San Joaquin Valley. The letters claimed that officials would have noticed an uptick in medfly numbers around March 1989. The group promised to make the aerial spraying program politically and financially impossible through the coordinated release of thousands of medflies. As early as December 1989 the group's claim was taken seriously. Initially, the letter was dismissed as "some crank trying to get a lot of publicity", but there was evidence the group played a role in the infestation. Certain characteristics of the 1989 medfly infestation led investigators to the conclusion that someone was responsible for deliberately releasing medflies. The dense medfly population coupled with the low number of medfly larvae found in the infested areas left entomologists baffled as to how the infestation could be completely natural. Neither the writer of the letter, nor any members of the alleged group were ever identified.

== Response ==
The Federal Bureau of Investigation became involved in the investigation and the letters were turned over to the Los Angeles Police Department's Criminal Conspiracy Section. During the course of the investigation, the United States Department of Agriculture attempted to contact The Breeders through a classified ad placed in the Los Angeles Times. The ad stated: "Breeders if you're for real send one of your little friends. We want to talk. Call John at USDA."

In response to the threat, California State Senator Ruben S. Ayala introduced the bill SB1754 in the Senate Agriculture and Water Resources Committee to make it a felony for any person to import Mediterranean fruit flies into the state, rather than the misdemeanor it already was. The bill included prison sentences ranging from 16 months to three years, and fines up to $10,000. Senator Ayala's proposal became law June 22, 1990, and added Section 6306 to the Food and Agriculture Code.

In the year following the attack, there were seizures of postal shipments that sought to intercept medfly larvae. In addition, 61,731 passengers and 2,430 cargo shipments were searched entering through airports, but no larvae were discovered. There were five "intensive searches" of cargo and baggage as they arrived at Los Angeles International Airport and San Francisco International Airport that tested positive for medfly larvae.

6306. Unless otherwise permitted by law, any person who willfully and knowingly imports into, or who willfully and knowingly transports or ships within, this state, a Mediterranean fruit fly is guilty of a felony.

— California Food and Agricultural Code, Section 6306

After its repeated sprayings failed to eradicate the medfly threat, California halted its Malathion aerial spraying program in March 1990, three months after the threat from The Breeders was received. The state instead opted to try the voluntary introduction of millions of radiation-sterilized medflies to interrupt the reproductive cycle and control the population.

Later, South Dakota reported that a similar attack with a corn or soybean pests could devastate their agriculture industry. In May 2001, Mark Urlaub, the Department of Agriculture's biosecurity program director, announced that investigators were "taking another look at" the 1989 attack.

== See also ==
- Agro-terrorism
- Ecotage
- Entomological warfare
