= Ceratitis andranotobaka =

Scientific classification
- Kingdom: Animalia
- Phylum: Arthropoda
- Class: Insecta
- Order: Diptera
- Family: Tephritidae
- Genus: Ceratitis
- Species: C. andranotobaka

Binomial name
- Ceratitis andranotobaka Hancock, 1984

Species of fly

Ceratitis andranotobaka is a species of tephritid fruit fly.
