= Ceratitis flexuosa =

Scientific classification
- Kingdom: Animalia
- Phylum: Arthropoda
- Class: Insecta
- Order: Diptera
- Family: Tephritidae
- Genus: Ceratitis
- Species: C. flexuosa

Binomial name
- Ceratitis flexuosa (Walker, 1853)

Species of fly

Ceratitis flexuosa is a species of fly in the family Tephritidae.

Specimens located in West Africa, Congo Basin and Lake Victoria.

Originally classed as a Trypeta, later changed to the genus Ceratitis.
