= Ceratitis grahami =

Scientific classification
- Kingdom: Animalia
- Phylum: Arthropoda
- Class: Insecta
- Order: Diptera
- Family: Tephritidae
- Genus: Ceratitis
- Species: C. grahami

Binomial name
- Ceratitis grahami Munro, 1935

Species of fly

Ceratitis grahami is a species of insect in the family Tephritidae. It is known from Ghana, from the East Guinean Forest ecoregion.
