= Agro-terrorism =

Malicious attacks on agriculture

Agroterrorism, also known as agriterrorism and agricultural terrorism, is a malicious attempt to disrupt or destroy the agricultural industry and/or food supply system of a population through "the malicious use of plant or animal pathogens to cause devastating disease in the agricultural sectors". It is closely related to the concepts of biological warfare, chemical warfare and entomological warfare, except carried out by non-state parties.

A hostile attack, towards an agricultural environment, including infrastructures and processes, in order to significantly damage national or international political interests.

== Nomenclature ==
The terms agroterrorism, along with agroterror and agrosecurity, were coined by veterinarian pathologist Corrie Brown and writer Esmond Choueke in September 1999 as a means to spread the importance of this topic. The first public use of agroterrorism was in a report by Dr. Brown which was then reprinted in a front-page article of The New York Times on September 22, 1999, by reporter Judith Miller. Dr. Brown's article in the book "Emerging Diseases of Animals" served to further popularize the term. The Oxford Dictionary now recognizes the word agroterrorism and its derivatives. An initial debate by Dr. Brown and Mr. Choueke involved the spellings agriterror vs. agroterror. The spelling with the "o" won, as it was closest to bioterrorism and thus would be easier to remember.

== Theory ==
Clemson University's Regulatory and Public Service Program listed "diseases vectored by insects" among bioterrorism scenarios considered "most likely". Because invasive species are already a problem worldwide one University of Nebraska–Lincoln entomologist considered it likely that the source of any sudden appearance of a new agricultural pest would be difficult, if not impossible, to determine. Lockwood considers insects a more effective means of transmitting biological agents for acts of bioterrorism than the actual agents. In his opinion insect vectors are easily gathered and their eggs easily transportable without detection. Isolating and delivering biological agents, on the other hand, is extremely challenging and hazardous.

== See also ==
- 1989 California medfly attack
- Anti-agriculture weapons
- Biosecurity
- Bioterrorism
- Eco-terrorism
- Food security
- Scorched earth
- Incendiary balloons
