= Ceratitis aliena =

Scientific classification
- Kingdom: Animalia
- Phylum: Arthropoda
- Clade: Pancrustacea
- Class: Insecta
- Order: Diptera
- Family: Tephritidae
- Genus: Ceratitis
- Species: C. aliena

Binomial name
- Ceratitis aliena (Bezzi, 1920)

Species of fly

Ceratitis aliena is a species of insect in the family Tephritidae. This is a genus of Tephritid or fruit flies.
