= Breeder (animal) =

Animal being used for breeding

In agriculture and in animal fancy, a breeder is an animal used for selective breeding. A breeder is usually a purebred animal, bred with the intent of producing purebred, or even show-quality animals. However, in some cases, a breeding animal is crossbred with another breed or a mixed breed with the intent of combining aspects of two or more different breeds.

== Purebred and registered animals ==
If the breeding is for a purebred animal that will be used for exhibition or future breeding (pets or livestock), the animal must be registered and conform to the criteria laid out for that breed in a breed standard kept by a central authority, such as a kennel club for dogs. In addition, the breed club, kennel club, or other governing authority may have other restrictions on the type of animal that can be used for breeding to produce offspring that can be registered.

For example, some horse registries allow backbred and crossbred individuals to be breeders. However, most dog registries do not accept crossbred animals for registration, except in exceptional circumstances and only by permission. Most kennel clubs allow any registered individual to be a breeder, however the individual breed club may have additional criteria such as having to pass certain eligibility requirements.

== Terminology ==
In animal fancy, there are specialized words for breeding animals in some species. (Not to be confused with the words for an animal's parents, sire and dam.)

Species	Male	Female
Cat	stud	queen
Cattle	bull	heifer or cow
Dog	stud	brood bitch
Goat	buck	doe
Guinea pig	boar	sow
Horse	stallion	mare
Pigeon	cock	hen
Rabbit	buck	doe
Sheep	ram	ewe

== See also ==
- Animal breeding
- Animal fancy
- Animal husbandry
