= The Breed =

The Breed may refer to:

- The Breed (2001 film), a vampire horror film directed by Michael Oblowitz
- The Breed (2006 film), a killer dog horror film directed by Nicholas Mastandrea
- The Breed, a rap artist from the UK

See also:

- Breed
