= Obstetric medicine =

Obstetric medicine, similar to maternal medicine, is a sub-specialty of general internal medicine and obstetrics that specializes in the process of prevention, diagnosing, and treating medical disorders in with pregnant women. It is closely related to the specialty of maternal-fetal medicine, although obstetric medicine does not directly care for the fetus. The practice of obstetric medicine, or previously known as "obstetric intervention," primarily consisted of the extraction of the baby during instances of duress, such as obstructed labor or if the baby was positioned in breech.

Obstetric physicians may provide care for chronic medical conditions that precede the pregnancy (such as epilepsy, asthma or heart disease), or for new medical problems that develop while the pregnancy is already in progress (such as gestational diabetes, and hypertension). By the 19th century, obstetrics had become recognized as a medical discipline in Europe and the United States. Formal training in obstetric medicine is currently offered in Australia, New Zealand, the United States, and Canada.

== History and current status ==
Obstetrics gains its origins from the observation that, throughout historical record, women have accompanied other women during the birthing stage of their pregnancy. Similar findings can be observed in Anthropological research of tribal birthing practices, ancient Egyptian depictions, and even scriptures in the Old Testament illustrate the presence of a woman figure, be it doctor or relative, present among the birthing of a baby.

During the 17th century, doctors were weary about the connection between midwifery and medicine, and thus failed to acknowledge its credibility. The practice of women assisting women through labor was viewed as uneducated. However, as time progressed, a new perspective among pregnant patients grew, where by they sought for mid-wives to deliver their babies. For example, in Wales and England, under 1% of people delivered their babies at home, which was a testament to the rise of midwives, that led to the present day professional field of Obstetrics. The roles of physicians in the process in delivering babies expanded as 17th century aristocrats utilized the best medical practitioners they could find.

=== Obstetrics in the 1900s ===
During this period, the medical field was still grappling with the idea of obstetrics and midwifery, which were activities thought to be practiced by uneducated females, as they were unable to form a connection between medicine and midwifery. These circumstances led to the mistreatment of pregnant women, who were often made to partake in experimental procedures and untested treatments, which led to harm on mothers and the fetus.

=== Midwife Act 1902 ===
The purpose of the act was to improve training for midwives as well as regulating their practice. This meant that women who wanted to identify as "midwives" had to do so under the certification and verification of the Act. Penalties would incur on women who fraudulently claimed certification, with imprisonment possibly going up to 12 months. The caveat to this act was that a woman could practically engage in midwife duties, however they could not give them self the title of midwife or imply that they were affiliated with the title. However, the basis of the act was the acknowledgement of the field, creating an environment for people to gain professional knowledge about the field. This act was significant in leading to the present practice of obstetric medicine as it created a pathway for women to begin practicing with pre/post natal care, leading to the discovery of numerous methods in obstetric medicine.

=== Lack of access ===
Maternal mortality is an ongoing issue that is rising among pregnant women. A challenge facing many pregnant women is the lack of access to specialized obstetric care, often resulting in untimely deaths and an increasing rate of maternal morbidity. This lack of access offered to women has resulted in an outreach programs attempted by clinicians to reach women who are currently suffering from the consequences of reduced accessibility. This increased awareness is emerging during a time of "obstetric transition", where research is noticing a notable shift in patterns from instances of high maternal mortality to patterns of lower maternal mortality. These patterns depict instances of high maternal mortality associated with implicit obstetric cause, while instances of low maternal mortality are related to factors such as maternal age, non-communicable disease (NCD) and indirect causes of maternal death (not directly linked to obstetric care).

The total cost of having a child in a hospital is can total several thousand dollars, which can be an expensive hurdle depending on an individual's socioeconomic status. Many countries lack the funding required to provide women from low-income households with prenatal care needs. This poses a problem for many women who are uninsured, or do not have access to adequate insurance. For women who are completely uninsured, their only source of prenatal care can be from charities and programs run by public funds, which is not a reliable source of prenatal care that has to be done regularly. When considering couples who have children in their early 20s, with an annual income of $19,800, having a child that on average costs $4,800, is a financial burden. Numerous insurance companies do not cover maternity care, which indicates that possessing insurance does not immediately clear couples of debt.

== Medicine and tools ==
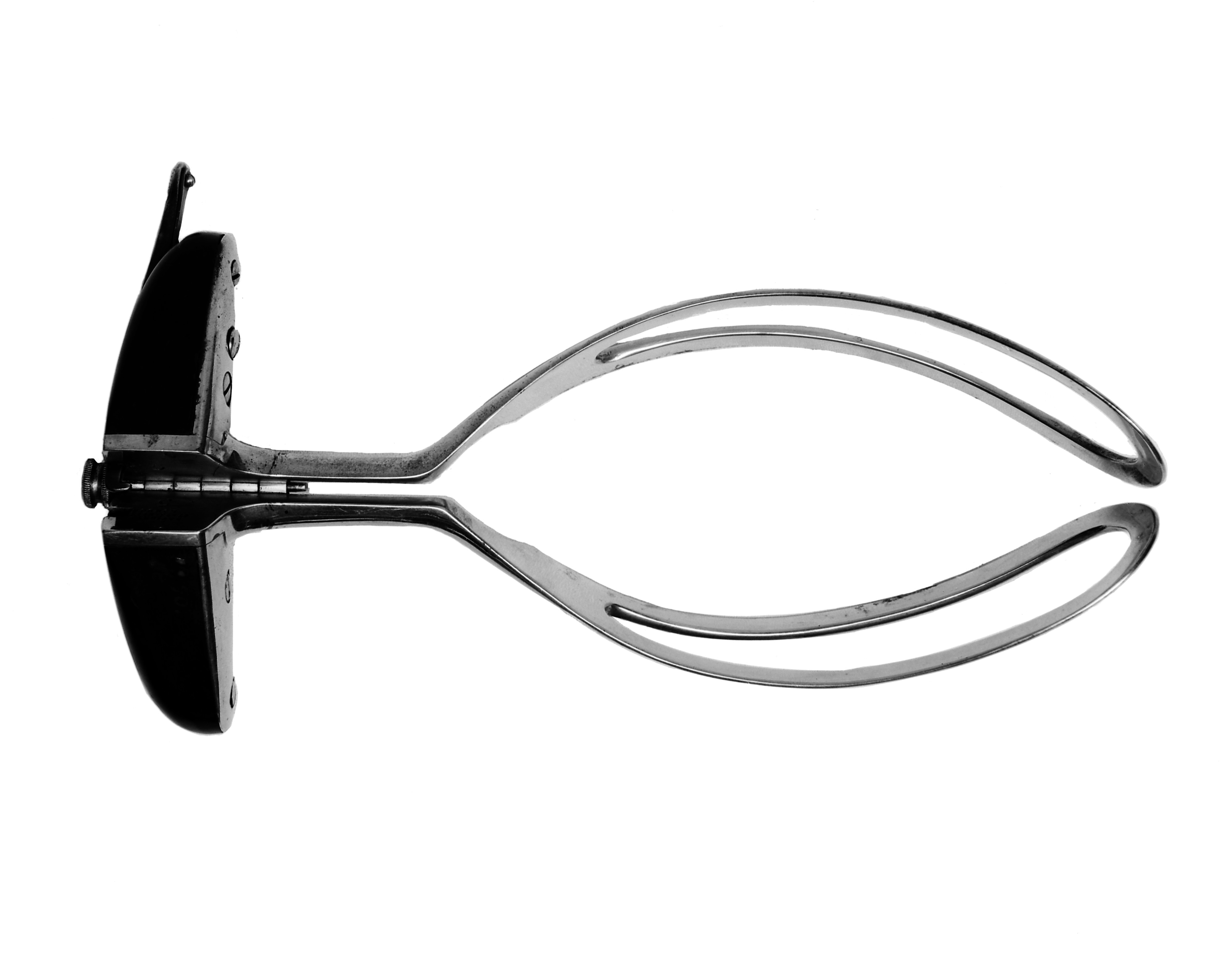
Forceps

=== Early obstetrics ===
During the 18th century, common methods of resolving obstructed labor often resulted in high mortality of the infant. These methods included pulling on the legs of the baby or using breeching hooks. William Smellie revolutionized child birth by writing works on how to use forceps in the assistance if childbirth. The practice of using forceps proved to be much more effective and less damaging to the baby.

=== Medication ===
By the 20th century, medicinal drugs were used to treat pregnant women, or to provide them with prenatal care. By the 1950s, women were having given contraceptive pills to begin regulating their hormones and fertility, which effectively allowed couples to have planned pregnancies. By the 21st century, women were being given medication for the induction and augmentation of labor.

== Common ailments ==
Treating the ailments of pregnant mothers requires a unique approach, since medicines commonly used may have an adverse effect on the fetus. Some common ailments include, but are not limited to :

- Hypertension (high blood pressure)
- Pulmonary disease
- Gestational diabetes
- Lupus
- Blood clots
- Heart disease
- Kidney disease
- Seizures
- Thyroid problems
- Bleeding disorders
- Asthma
- Obesity in pregnancy
- Depression
- Ectopic pregnancy
- Anemia
- Preeclampsia (related to hypertension)

=== Postpartum depression ===
A common ailment of pregnant women is postpartum depression. Depression can cause pregnant women to have poor nutrition or inadequate strength to nurture herself and her baby. The result of this can be problems in development and health of the fetus. The use of medicine to treat postpartum depression is a subject for debate, since some research indicates that the use of antidepressants during pregnancy can lead to physical malformations and long-term health problems of the baby Other forms of treatment include support groups and psychotherapy.

=== Gestational diabetes ===
Gestational diabetes is observed by elevated glucose levels in pregnant women who have never had diabetes. This form of diabetes occurs when placental hormones interfere with insulin produced by the mother, resulting in an excess of glucose in the blood. The excess glucose will cross the placenta and cause the baby's pancreas to produce extra insulin and store the excess glucose as fat. Gestational diabetes is treated by a diet and exercise regiment the goal of maintaining lower levels of glucose in the body. Gestational diabetes increases the risk of high blood pressure, preeclampsia, C-section or developing diabetes in the future. It is important to adapt to healthy habits if one has gestational diabetes. Intervention diet, becoming physically active and weight control all help reduce any health problems or risk in the future.

=== Hypertension ===
Gestational hypertension is characterized by high blood pressure during pregnancy. Chronic hypertension can lead to a severe condition called preeclampsia, which can result in damage to organs. Hypertension can cause the placenta to not receive enough blood and starving the fetus of oxygen. Hypertension is treated in pregnant mothers by adjusting their diet to contain less fat and salt, consuming enough water, and getting regular exercise.

=== Obesity during pregnancy ===
Maternal obesity is a rising epidemic among pregnant women, that is detrimental to both the health of the baby and the mother. Obesity leads pregnant women to develop gestational diabetes and preeclampsia, and increase the risk of stillbirth and numerous congenital anomalies. Studies have shown that prolonged sitting time, either before or during pregnancy, is a strong indicator of the risk for gestational diabetes. However, light physical activities like walking were not found to be associated with an increased risk of gestational diabetes mellitus. Beyond the immediate risks during pregnancy, the obesity of the mother tends to create a predisposition for the baby to have the inclination to develop conditions like heart disease and diabetes. During pregnancy, the rate at which nutrition is absorbed and conveyed to the fetus affects its physiology and metabolic regularity. Nutrition available in either abundance, or scarcity, both affect the overall outcome of the fetus, thus creating a precursor for future health developments. Typical treatment includes monitored consumption of food, as well as moderate exercise. It is well known that the practice of physical activity effectively prevents or reduces obesity. These benefits are also extended to pregnant women. While exercise is important and can help the mother lose weight, it is important to know that when it comes to obese mothers, the ultimate goal is not weight loss but, more so weight control. Extreme changes in diet can lead to significant and reproducible shifts in microbial composition.

A body mass index of 25 or higher as a pregnant woman is associated with an increased risk of offspring macrosomia (birth weight in excess of 4,000 grams or 8 pounds). This is further associated with moderate to severe obesity at school age, making it a predictor of offspring body composition. Children born to obese mothers are more prone to obesity and more prone to developing gastrointestinal and metabolic diseases later on in life. Each additional kilogram of gestational weight gain increases the offspring's risk of overweight or obesity by 1-23%. Maternal health status has a significant impact on the newborn's gut microbiota. Breastmilk is important for the development and maintenance of the infant microbiota after birth. Once the baby is born, it is important for the mother to continue watching her health by staying on a diet and physically active.

=== Historically significant ailments in the 1900s ===
==== Puerperal sepsis ====
Puerperal Sepsis is a bacterial infection that affects the genital tract, commonly occurring after the birth of a baby. The symptoms typically appear one day after pregnancy, however symptoms may appear earlier if the woman has had prolonged damage to the membranes in the vaginal tract. This was a leading factor in maternal mortality, as 80%-90% of women in some hospitals did not survive after receiving their diagnosis due to the rapidly spreading nature of the infection. Malnourished women, or with women with anaemia were susceptible to the infection. Some common symptoms included, but were not limited to: fever (temperature of 38 °C or more), chills and general malaise, lower abdominal pain, tender uterus, sub involution of the uterus purulent, and foul-smelling lochia.

=== Special cases ===
==== Pregnancy and HIV ====
Out of the 2 million people in the world living with HIV, 90% of them contract it from their HIV-positive mother from either breastfeeding, pregnancy, or birth. HIV positive women who become pregnant require special types of treatment in order to prevent transmission from mother to fetus. Antiretrovirals are medications that reduce the viral load of the HIV virus in the mother's fluids and blood. It is ideal to start treatment as early as possible, even before conceiving. Reduction of the viral load reduces the chance of the baby to become infected.

== Ethics ==
Many ethical issues arise around whether the mothers right to autonomy may have adverse effects on the fetus. These types of situations have been described as maternal autonomy vs. fetal rights. In the case of Angela Carter, In re A.C., a court order to perform an emergency cesarean section resulted in the death of the severely premature fetus and the terminally ill mother. In addition, obstetricians and pediatricians face challenges when a pregnant HIV positive woman refuses treatment to prevent transmission from mother to baby. In these cases, mothers have the right to refuse treatments during pregnancy, but may subsequently face custody battles from the government to prevent the transmission of HIV via breastfeeding.

Another important field of discussion is what types of clinical trials are ethically appropriate for pregnant mothers. When a drug designed to benefit the health of the mother is being tested, the potential benefits of the drug may only be explored if the risk to the fetus is minimal. However, the concern is how severe must a health condition must be to justify exposing the fetus to any sort of risk. Clinical trials on pregnant women are forbidden if the drug is not designed for the benefit of the mother or fetus.
