= The Lively Ones (TV series) =

American musical variety TV series (1962–1963)

The Lively Ones is an American musical variety television series that was broadcast July 26, 1962 - September 13, 1962, and July 25, 1963 - September 12, 1963, on NBC as the summer replacement for Hazel from 9:30 to 10 p.m. Eastern Time on Thursdays. The program presented "the best musical acts in the country against some of the most far-out backgrounds imaginable".

== Background ==
The program originated as a plan for selling automobiles. In 1962, Ford Motor Company introduced a new lineup of cars that were advertised as "The Lively Ones". Lee Iacocca, vice-president at Ford, thought of having a TV show of the same name as a boost to the company's marketing efforts, with the program featuring "the country's top musical talents — the lively one, the best, just as the automobiles were liveliest and best".

== Overview ==
Both years' programs starred Vic Damone in episodes that often were recorded at a variety of locations around the United States. Jerry Fielding's orchestra provided music. Each year Damone was accompanied by two "constant dates", but the young women featured in the second year were different from those of the first year. Episodes also featured guests, some of whom were well-known, and others who were "new talent". Barry Shear produced and directed the series. He described the locations used in the show as "places where the young set of today, the lively set" went. Shear indicated that the program was aimed at young people who were ready for music other than rock and roll — "other entertainment, some of which is very sophisticated". He called the show's content "solid music for grownups" and said that he hoped younger people would be exposed to better music than that to which they were accustomed. Damone described the program's concept: "The idea was to keep things moving at a certain beat, almost as if the entire show was one piece of music."

== 1962 ==
Damone's dates were Tiger and Charley, portrayed by Joan Staley and Shirley Yelm, respectively. Guests included:

- Laurindo Almeida
- Louis Bellson
- Chris Connor
- The Dave Brubeck Quartet
- Ella Fitzgerald
- Terry Gibbs
- Frank Gorshin
- Woody Herman
- Damita Jo
- Joe and Eddie
- Jack Jones
- Stan Kenton
- Gene Krupa
- Peggy Lee
- The Limelighters
- Dorothy Loudon
- Shelly Manne
- Jack Marshall
- Peter Nero
- The New Christy Minstrels
- Ruth Olay
- Oscar Peterson
- Andre Previn
- Cal Tjader
- Joe Williams
- Si Zentner

== 1963 ==
Smitty and Melvin, played by Quinn O'Hara and Gloria Neil, respectively, were Damone's companions. Guests included:

- Charlie Barnet
- Count Basie and his orchestra
- Les Baxter's Balladeers
- Charlie Byrd Trio
- Eddie Cano
- Page Cavanaugh
- June Christy
- Matt Dennis
- Roy Eldridge
- Frances Faye
- Pete Fountain
- Stan Getz
- Benny Goodman and his Sextette
- Al Hirt
- Lisa Kirk
- Julie London
- Nellie Lutcher
- Jaye P. Morgan
- Red Nichols and the Five Pennies
- Anita O'Day
- Della Reese
- Allan Sherman
- Joanie Sommers
- Mel Tormé

== Production ==
Innovations were not limited to the varied locales; some segments added animated elements to live performances, and Damone's introductions of guests used "audio-visual devices". In 1962, the show's eight episodes were made in three weeks.

== Recognition ==
The Lively Ones received four nominations for Emmy Awards:

- Outstanding Achievement In Electronic Camera Work (1963)
- Outstanding Achievement In Electronic Photography (1964)
- Outstanding Program Achievement In The Field Of Music (1963)
- Outstanding Program Achievement In The Field Of Music (1964)

== Critical response ==
Jack Gould wrote in a review in The New York Times that the varied backgrounds and visual effects used on The Lively Ones diminished enjoyment of the music: "The eye is so busy keeping up with Mr. Shear's tinkering with the video that the ear never really gets with the audio." He cited specific examples from the July 25, 1963, episode to support his statement and added that members of the audience might want to just listen: "Turn off the picture, and the show is fair radio."

A review of the premiere episode in the trade publication Variety called it "a light and airy potpourri of song and music" that was "inventive and breezy ... despite over-gimmickry in camera conception and staging design". The reviewer expressed surprise that Damone was not featured more but added that the guest performers did well.

== Integration with advertising ==
The trade magazine Sponsor reported in October 1962 that Ford and other automobile companies had "embarked on singularly effective marketing campaigns designed to capture the youth market", and that TV seemed "a superb vehicle" for reaching that market. The article called The Lively Ones a "delightful color TV excursion" and said that experts in the industry considered it "one of the most effective non-sports campaigns".

Ford's 1962 advertising campaign integrated elements of the program into commercials, with Damone and his "dates" from the show appearing in some of the TV advertising. Two commercials from that group were recognized in the fourth annual American Television Commercials Festival. A commercial for the Ford Fairlane was named best in Program Openings & Billboards, and a special citation for Music with Lyrics went to another commercial.
