= Good breeding =

Good breeding may refer to:

- Purebred, "cultivated varieties" of a species
- Etiquette, the socially reinforced standards of conduct which show the actor to be cultured, polite, and refined
- Eugenics, a social philosophy which advocates the improvement of human hereditary traits through various forms of intervention
