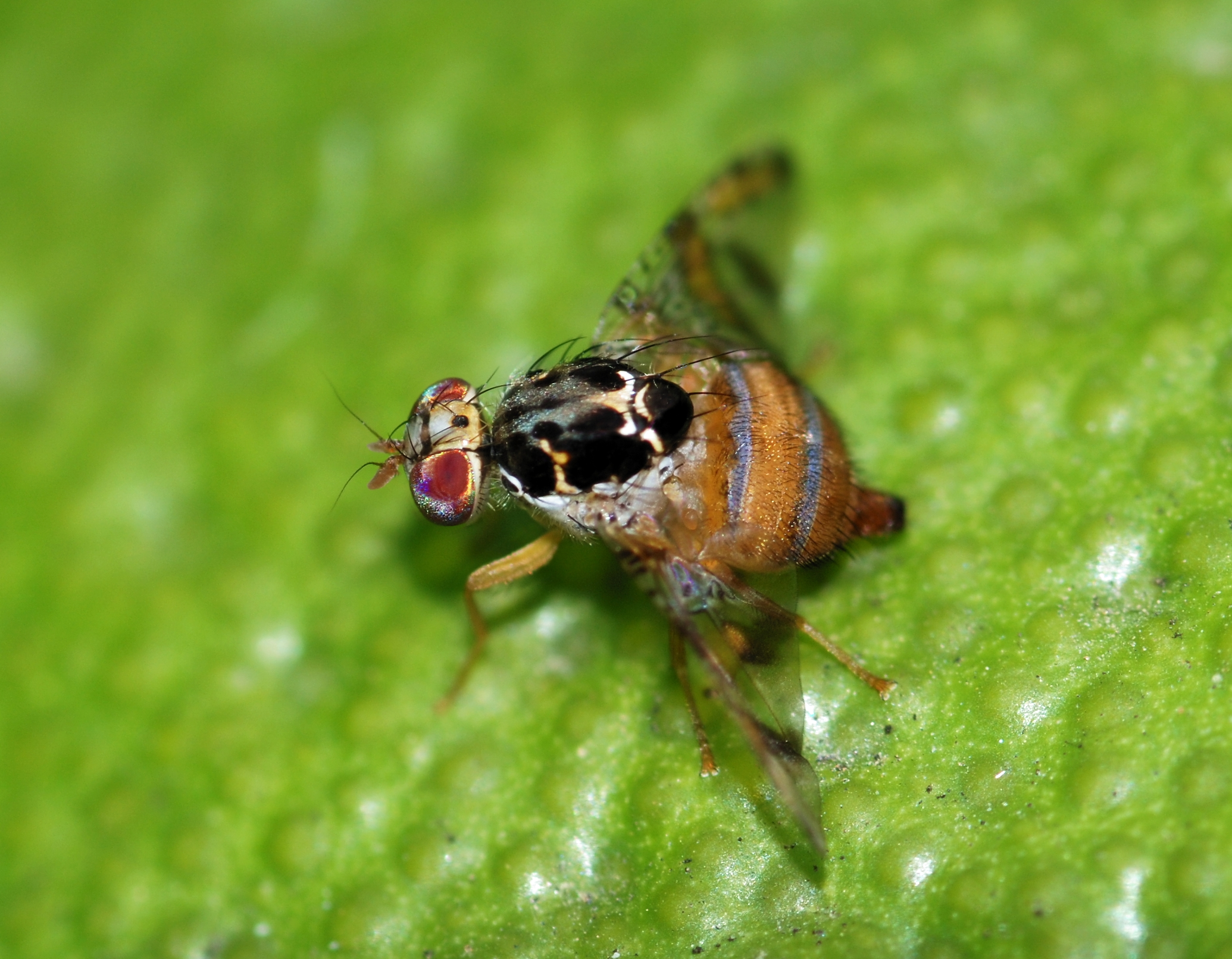
- Female, with ovipositor visible at the end of the abdomen

Scientific classification
- Kingdom: Animalia
- Phylum: Arthropoda
- Clade: Pancrustacea
- Class: Insecta
- Order: Diptera
- Family: Tephritidae
- Genus: Ceratitis
- Species: C. capitata

Binomial name
- Ceratitis capitata (Wiedemann, 1824)

= Ceratitis capitata =

Species of insect

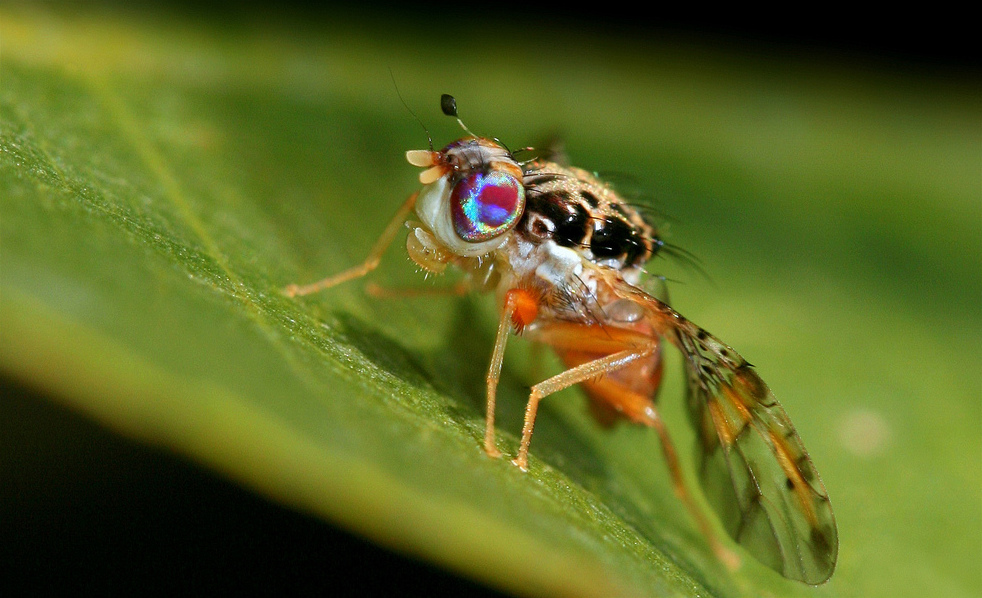
The male of Ceratitis capitata, showing the vivid iridescent coloration of the eyes of the species

Ceratitis capitata, commonly known as the Mediterranean fruit fly or medfly, is a yellow-and-brown fly native to sub-Saharan Africa. It has no near relatives in the Western Hemisphere and is considered to be one of the most destructive fruit pests in the world. There have been occasional medfly infestations in California, Florida, and Texas that require extensive eradication efforts to prevent the fly from establishing itself in the United States.

C. capitata is the most economically important fruit fly species because of both its ability to survive cooler climates more successfully than most other fruit fly species and its ability to inhabit more than 200 tropical fruits and vegetables to which it causes severe destruction and degradation. The practices that are used to eradicate the medfly after its introduction into a new environment can be extremely difficult and expensive, but infestation of C. capitata lowers crop yields and induces costly sorting processes for fresh fruits and vegetables.

== Physical description ==
=== Egg ===
C. capitata eggs are characterized by their curved shape, shiny white color, and smooth features. Each egg is approximately 1 millimetre (5/128 in) in length. As seen in other fruit flies, the eggs possess a micropylar region with a clear tubular shape.

=== Larvae ===
Larvae of C. capitata have been described as having a common fruit fly larval shape that is cylindrical with a narrow anterior end and flattened caudal tail. By the end of the third and final instar of the medfly, the larvae measure between 7 and 9 millimetres (35/128 and 45/128 in) with about eight fusiform areas visible on their undersides.

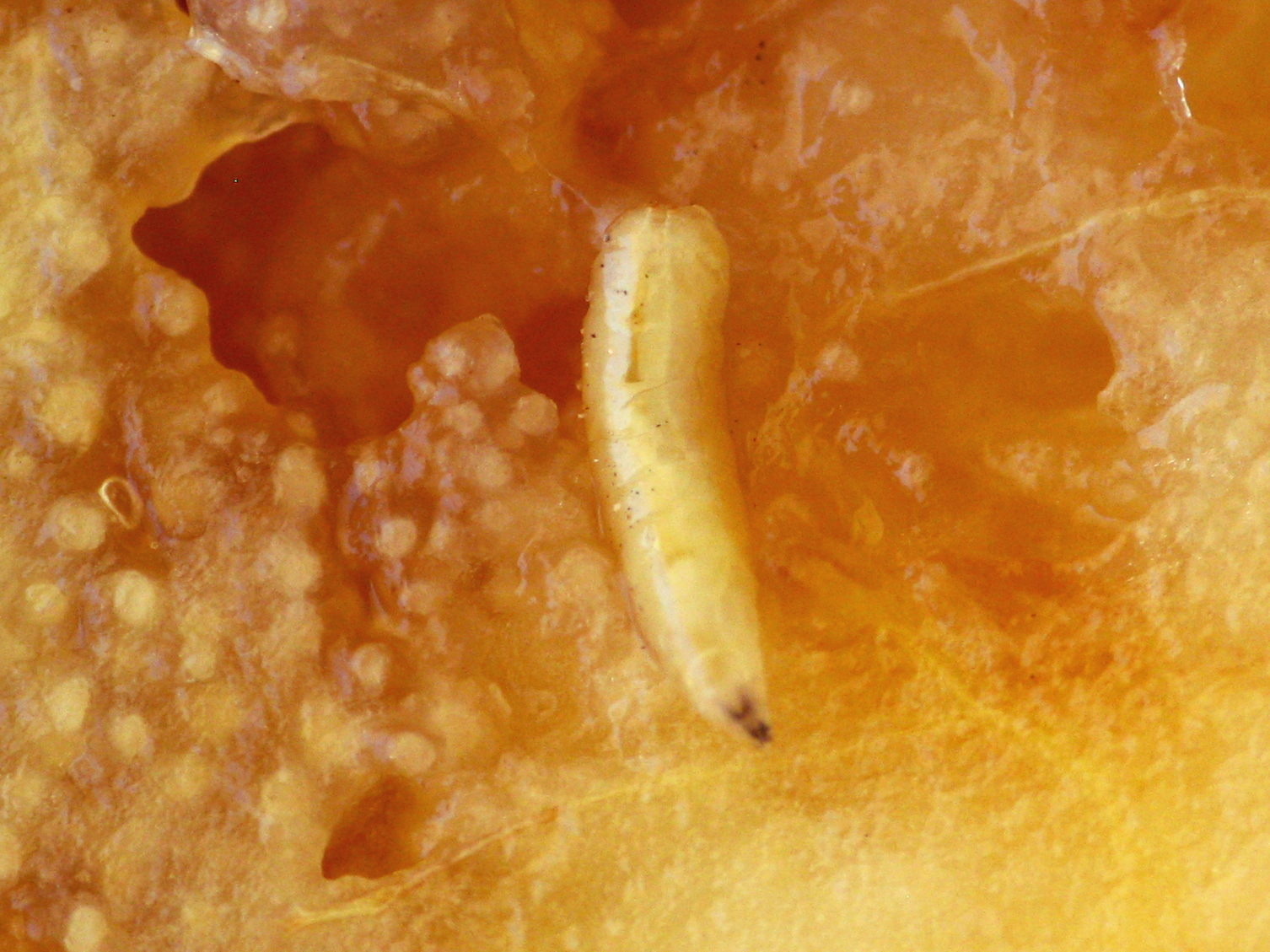
Larva of the medfly

=== Adult ===
The adult flies typically measure 3 to 5 millimetres (15/128 to 25/128 in) in length. There are numerous visually defining characteristics of the C. capitata's bodily features. The thorax is a creamy white to yellow with a characteristic pattern of black blotches, and the abdomen is tinted brown with fine black bristles located on the dorsal surface and two light bands on the basal half. The medfly's wings contain a band across the middle of the wing with dark streaks and spots in the middle of the wing cells.

In a study done by Siomava et al., researchers utilized geometric morphometrics to analyze wing shape in three different fly species including C. capitata. Through their findings, the researchers showed that the medfly exhibits extensive sexual shape dimorphism (SShD) between the proximal and distal part of the wing. This difference can be used to distinguish between the two sexes since male wings tend to be wider and shorter in comparison to females. This anatomical difference is important because this allows males to displace more air and create a more audible "buzzing" effect during mate attraction.

The males also can be distinguished by the fact that they have two setae between their eyes; the setae are conspicuously flattened and black at their ends.

== Distribution ==
The Geographic Distribution Map of C. capitata provides information on the distribution of the Mediterranean fruit fly, C. capitata, throughout the world. The information is mainly based on available Mediterranean fruit fly national surveillance reports. Therefore, the map displays assessments of the presence of this pest at the national level and in some cases at sub-national levels. According to this map, C. capitata is present throughout Africa, South and Central America, the Middle East, and Southern Europe. It has been confirmed to be absent in much of North America, the Indian subcontinent, some parts of South America, and most of Australia. Climate change might have role in modifying the distribution and abundance of C. capitata.

The four stages of the C. capitata life cycle are the egg, larvae, pupae and adult stages. Female medflies oviposit in groups of roughly 10–14 eggs and deposit them just under the skin surface of their host fruit. Once the eggs are deposited below the skin, they hatch in only a few days, emerging as maggots, or larvae. C. capitata flies are known to disperse up to distances of 12 miles in search of host fruit. In the instances where host fruit is plentiful in their current locations, they will not disperse beyond 300 to 700 feet.

=== Temperature effects ===
Medflies can complete their life cycles in 21 days in optimum conditions. In cooler temperatures, the life cycle of the medfly can take up to 100 days to complete. In temperatures that are below 50 °F (10 °C), development of the fly ceases. Oviposition in females ceases to occur in temperatures below 60 °F (16 °C).

=== Lifespan ===
The lifespan of the C. capitata is quite short as half of most populations die in under 60 days. However, cool conditions and proper sustenance can enable some flies to live 6 months or up to a year. In lab conditions, under controlled diets of sugar and protein, the life expectancy of females is usually longer than that of males by 1.5 days. On average, the lifespans of flies in captivity are 10 days longer than those of wild flies.

The lifespans of certain species are also affected by periods of food deprivation, which is a key driver of invasion success, adaptation, and biodiversity. Starvation resistance is a plastic trait that varies due to the relation between environmental and genetic factors. Recent studies into the starvation resistance (SR) of C. capitata has found that SR decreases with increasing age and that age-specific patterns are shaped in relation to adult and larval diet. Furthermore, females exhibited higher SR than males, and the greatest influence on SR in C. capitata was due to age and adult diet followed by sex and larval diet.

== Food resources ==
Among fruit fly species, C. capitata has the largest variety of host-fruits, including over 200 different types of fruits and vegetables. These fruits include but are not limited to akee, star apple, oranges, grapefruit, guava, mango, plum, and pears. C. capitata in the adult and larval stage feed in different ways.

=== Larva ===
Because nutrition is a crucial determinant of adult size and development, larva prefer to eat fleshy host fruit. Higher concentrations of glucose and sucrose boost development and the percentage of emerging larva in comparison to high starch and maltose diets.

By manipulating larval diets with relation to brewer's yeast and sucrose, researchers were able to show that varying the levels of yeast and sucrose in the diet changes the proportion of proteins to carbohydrates which affects the ability of pupating larvae to accumulate lipid reserves. Diets with high protein to carbohydrate ratios produced larvae with high protein and lipid contents. Conversely, diets with a low protein to carbohydrate ratio led to pupating larvae having relatively reduced loads of lipids. Parental condition may affect larval responses to the immediate dietary environment through a process known as maternal effects.

=== Pupal ===
Research into the correlation between citrus variety, fruit part and stage of C. capitata has found strong effects on larval performance, smaller effects on pupae, and no effects on eggs. The highest survival rate was shown to be on bitter oranges; however, the shortest developmental time and heaviest pupae were obtained from orange cultivars. In short, pulp chemical properties such as acidity and soluble solid contents had little effect on larval and pupal survival but larger effects on pupal weight.

=== Adult ===
Adults tend to gain their carbohydrate intake from ripe fruit and protein from decomposing fruit or leftover bird feces. While larva prefer the middle of the fruit, adults prefer the fruit portion that contains more nutritional value in comparison to the flesh. Their diet preferences have been proven by studies in which medflies placed at the top of oranges and papayas consistently moved lower to the nutrient dense parts whereas flies placed near the bottom remained in their starting location. Adult flies typically feed in the mid-morning/late afternoon.

With respect to reproductive success of male C. capitata, males that are fed a diet consisting of no protein copulated at a significantly lower rate than males who were fed protein. In short, male diets are a significant factor in the mating success of male C. capitata as dictated by the receptivity of females to further copulations.

It was shown, that adults of C. capitata host diazotrophic bacteria from the Enterobacteriaceae family in their gut. These symbionts actively fix nitrogen by the enzyme nitrogenase which can alleviate nitrogen limitation and thus can be beneficial for the host.

== Mating behavior ==
=== General overview ===
Field observations conducted in various localities within the Hawaiian Islands, specifically in Kula, Maui and in Kona, Hawaii, showed researchers a clear distinction in the mating behavior of C. capitata. The mating ritual in this species of fly can be separated into two basic phases: (1) lek behavior and (2) courtship.

=== Males ===
In lek behavior, males begin by acquiring territory and jockeying with each other for optimal position. Leks are always located in positions that optimize the amount of sunlight penetrating the leaves. Mating in the C. capitata fly typically begins with males stationed at the bottom of the surface of leaves during the late morning or early afternoon. Once males are stationed at these locations, they begin the mating process by forming leks and releasing sex pheromones to attract virgin females. If successful, mating will occur during this time period. Another important location for copulation is on the fruit itself during the late morning or early afternoon. Males position themselves here in an attempt to copulate with already-mated females through seduction or force. A study conducted by Churchill-Stanland et al., showed that a male's size can dictate their mating success rate. Researchers found that flies weighing approximately 8–9 mg had optimum mating success while smaller flies (i.e. <6 mg) had significantly less mating success. Furthermore, when males were equal or larger in size, mating frequency was equal and events such as eclosion, flying, and mating speed were positively correlated with pupal size.

During the courtship phase, a series of signals are exchanged between the male and the female. As the female approaches, the male tucks his abdomen under his body with his abdominal pouches still inflated and wings still vibrating. Once the female is within 3–5 millimetres (15/128–25/128 in) of the male, the male will begin a series of head movements. Within 1–2 seconds of head movement initiation, the male begins rhythmically fanning its wings and moves closer to the female. Once close enough, the male then leaps onto the female's back and begins copulation.

=== Females ===
It has been shown that during mating, females experience a switch in olfactory-mediated behaviors. Specifically, virgin females prefer the pheromones of sexually developed males over the host fruit odor. Females exhibit this preference until mating occurs, following which they prefer the host fruit odor. This finding has been evidenced by a specific protein, CcapObp22, that shows approximately 37% identity with the pheromone binding protein of Drosophila melanogaster. In a recent study, this protein was shown to bind male pheromone components, specifically farnesene, a highly strong hydrophobic terpene.

== Genetics ==
Sex determination in C. capitata is by the typical XY system. Unusually for a dipteran and for a frugivore, medflies do not have an opsin gene for blue light perception as shown from the whole-genome sequencing project completed in September 2016. In a study done by Spanos et al. in 2001, researchers were able to sequence the entire mitochondrial genome of the fly. They found that the genome was 15,980 base pairs long with 22 tRNA genes and 13 genes encoding mitochondrial proteins. Using this information, researchers were able to use this genome sequence as a diagnostic tool for population analysis and a method to determine the source of recent introductions.

== Immunity and disease transmission ==
In a 1987 study completed by Postlethwait et al., researchers assessed the immune response of the medfly using bacterial inoculation. After inoculating the medfly with Enterobacter cloacae, the researcher extracted the haemolymph from the males and found that it contained potent antibacterial factors compared to the haemolymph of controls. Through further testing, they were able to show that these potent factors were generated within 3 hours of inoculation and lasted for approximately 8 days. This finding indicated that medflies do have an adaptive immune response that is similar to the Drosophila melanogaster.

Since it has been established that C. capitata is a cosmopolitan pest that affects hundreds of commercial and wild fruit species, considerable research has been done to assess the medfly's ability to transmit diseases. A 2005 study conducted by Sela et al. utilized green fluorescent protein (GFP)-tagged E. coli placed in fruit fly feeding solution to show that flies inoculated with GFP-tagged E. Coli was able to harbor the bacteria for up to 7 days following contamination. This finding showed that the medfly has the potential to be a vector of human pathogens to fruits.

== Aggression ==
Studies have shown that wild C. capitata flies were found to partake in more head-butting behavior, direct opponent contact, and less likely to cede an occupied leaf to an invader. Furthermore, it was found that sounds that are produced during body vibration constitutes threat behavior. Aggressive sounds are substantially higher in pitch (roughly around 1–3 kHz) while sounds produced during non-aggressive moments such as courtship times tended to be around 0.16–0.35 kHz. Aggressive behaviors can be observed during the courtship ritual. If the approaching fly is discerned to be an intruder male fly, the resident male fly terminates his calling position and lunges towards the intruder, physically pushing the intruder with his head. This interaction lasts until either party loses position or eventually leaves the position. Males can also partake in passive defensive actions which consists of a "face-off" with the intruder male rather than a physical "head-butt". Males in the "face-off" position can last up to 5 minutes until one male eventually turns and leaves the territory.

== Invasions and eradication ==
In the United States, C. capitata has invaded four states (Hawaii, California, Texas, and Florida) but has been eradicated from all but Hawaii. However, reintroduced populations of the medfly have been spotted in California as recently as 2009, requiring additional eradication and quarantine efforts. It has also been eradicated from New Zealand and Chile.

=== Eradication efforts in Mexico and Guatemala ===
Medflies were first detected in the region in Costa Rica in 1955. From then on, the medfly spread northward, reaching Guatemala in 1976 and Mexico in 1977. In order to begin eradication efforts, the Mass-rearing and Sterilization Laboratory was producing 500 million sterile flies weekly by the end of 1979. By releasing these sterile flies into the wild, scientists were able to not only prevent the northward spread of the fly, but officially declare it as eradicated from all of Mexico and large areas in Northern Guatemala in September 1982.

=== Eradication efforts in Western Australia ===
Utilizing the Sterile Insect Technique, the medfly was eradicated in December 1984 from Carnarvon, Western Australia. In the 1980s, the Western Australia Department of Agriculture conducted a feasibility study into using the Sterile Insect Technique to eradicate the medfly population. Phase 1 of this study utilized 70 traps to establish the seasonal abundance of wild fly prior to releases. In Phase 2 of the study, the Department of Agriculture released 7.5 million sterile flies per week; however, this was insufficient in limiting the wild fly population. During phases 3 and 4, the number of released sterile flies increased to 12 million a week and was combined with chemical controls. After wild flies were no longer detected, phase 5 was initiated, withdrawing chemical controls from further distribution. Eradication was declared when neither wild flies nor larvae were found during the period of October 1984 to January 1985. This period corresponded to 3 fly generations; a threshold of eradication utilized by Hendrichs et al. (1982) in the eradication of the medfly in Mexico.

=== Outbreaks in California ===
Much research has been dedicated to means of controlling the medfly. In particular, use of the sterile insect technique has allowed the species to be eradicated from several areas.

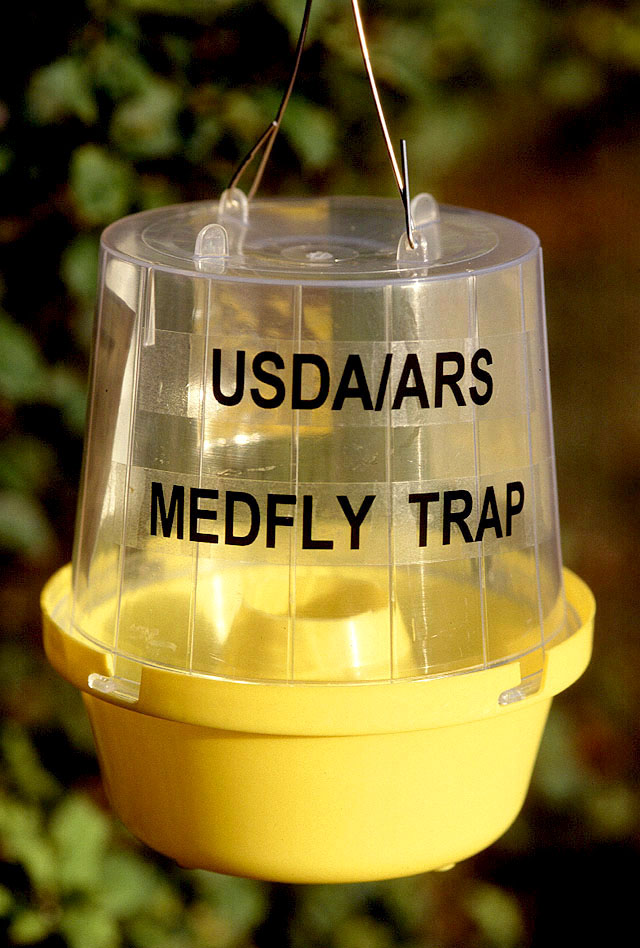
A typical trap used to capture C. capitata.

In 1981, California Governor Jerry Brown, who had established a reputation as a strong environmentalist, was confronted with a serious medfly infestation in the San Francisco Bay Area. He was advised by the state's agricultural industry and the US Department of Agriculture's Animal and Plant Health Inspection service (APHIS) to authorize airborne spraying of the region. Initially, in accordance with his environmental protection stance, he chose to authorize ground-level spraying only. Unfortunately, the infestation spread as the medfly reproductive cycle outpaced the spraying. After more than a month, millions of dollars of crops had been destroyed and billions of dollars more were threatened. Governor Brown then authorized a massive response to the infestation. Fleets of helicopters sprayed malathion at night, and the California National Guard set up highway checkpoints and collected many tons of local fruit. In the final stage of the campaign, entomologists released millions of sterile male medflies in an attempt to disrupt the insects' reproductive cycle.

Ultimately, the infestation was eradicated, but both the governor's delay and the scale of the action has remained controversial ever since. Some people claimed that malathion was toxic to humans, animals, as well as insects. In response to such concerns, Brown's chief of staff, B. T. Collins, staged a news conference during which he publicly drank a small glass of malathion. Many people complained that, while the malathion may not have been very toxic to humans, the aerosol spray containing it was corrosive to car paint.

During the week of September 9, 2007, adult flies and their larvae were found in Dixon, California. The California Department of Food and Agriculture and cooperating county and federal agricultural officials started eradication and quarantine efforts in the area. A 114 square mile quarantine zone was established in the area with local residents prohibited from transporting home-grown produce and agricultural shipments limited by regulation. Ground pesticide treatments were conducted in the immediate vicinity of where the flies were discovered, followed by the release of millions of sterile male medflies to combat the infestation. Eradication was declared on August 8, 2008, when no "wild" (i.e. non-sterile) medflies were detected for three generations.

On November 14, 2008, four adult flies were found in El Cajon, California. The San Diego County Agricultural Commission implemented a treatment plan, including distributing millions of sterile male flies, local produce quarantines, and ground spraying with organic pesticides.

In October 2021, pest detection staff in San Bernardino County found one medfly in the city of Upland. A second medfly was detected in November and a 95 square mile quarantine area was established on November 16. Properties within 200 meters of the detection locations were treated with an organic insecticide containing Spinosad, fruit removal was conducted in the area, and a sterile medfly release program was initiated. The quarantine effort was considered successful and discontinued on June 19, 2022 since no further medflies were detected after November 3, 2021.
