= Charles B. Breed =

Charles "Charlie" Blaney Breed
- Born: 1876; Lynn, Massachusetts
- Died: August 9, 1958 (aged 81–82); Camden, Maine
- Education: Massachusetts Institute of Technology
- Known for: contributions to civil engineering
- Scientific career
- Fields: Civil Engineering
- Workplaces: Massachusetts Institute of Technology

Charles Blaney Breed (1876–1958) was professor of civil engineering and head of the Department of Civil and Sanitary Engineering at the Massachusetts Institute of Technology. He studied and worked at MIT from the late 1800s to 1946. He co-wrote with George L. Hosmer the textbook, The Principles and Practice of Surveying, which was republished multiple times during the first half of the twentieth century. He was a consulting engineer in and around Boston until 1950.

== Early life and family ==
Charles B. Breed was born in Lynn, Massachusetts. He was a descendant of early Salem, Massachusetts settlers of 1624. In 1894 be began working for the City Engineering Department in Lynn and later worked at the Walden Pond Dam in Lynn as the resident engineer.

Charles is a member of the large Breed family and was president of the Breed Family Association during the 1920s.

== Career ==
Breed graduated from the MIT with a Bachelor of Science degree in civil engineering in 1897. At MIT, he taught in the Department of Civil and Sanitary Engineering focusing on railway and highway transportation and engineering. After graduating he immediately began teaching and worked his way from instructor to assistant professor, to professor and then head of the department. He served as head of the department from 1933 to 1943. In 1943, Breed stepped down from the head position to focus more on his work as a professor. Theodore B. Parker was appointed head after Breed. Professor T. B. Parker, 'II, was the former chief engineer of the Tennessee Valley Authority. Breed retired and became professor emeritus in 1946. Breed also served as chairman of the faculty from 1940 to 1942 and served on the MIT Pension Association in the 1940s.

== Publications ==
C. B. Breed and G. L. Hosmer. The Principles and Practice of Surveying. New York, Wiley & Sons, v. 1 1906, v. 2 1908

Breed, Charles B. "Railway Consolidation in New England," Street Railway Bulletin 32, pp. 17–25, January 1932.

Breed, Charles B. "A General Discussion of the Cost of Highway Transportation and an Analysis of Road Cost on Two Moderate Traffic State Highways in Massachusetts." Proceedings of the 12th Annual Meeting, Highway Research Board, Pt. I, 12, pp. 28–51, December 1932.

Breed, Charles B. "Report upon Cost of Roads Required for Heavy Motor Vehicles Compared with Roads Adequate for Passenger Automobiles and Light Trucks." Association of Railroads of Pennsylvania, November 1933.

Breed, Charles B. "Analysis of Road Cost on the State Highways of Worcester County, Massachusetts." Proceedings of the 13th Annual Meeting of the Highway Research Board. Part I. Reports of Research Committees and Papers, pp. 79–110, 1934.

Breed, Charles B. "Road Costs as Affected by Reconstruction on State Highway Route No. 18, Worcester County, Massachusetts." Proceedings of the 14th Annual Meeting of the Highway Research Board, 14, Part I, p. 60, 1935.

Breed, Charles B. "Current Highway Problems - Long-Time Planning." Eng. News-Record 117, November 1936.

Breed, Charles B. "Desirable Improvements in Concrete Highway Construction," Proceedings of the Thirteenth Annual Convention - Association of Highway Officials of the North Atlantic States, p. 104, February 1937.

Breed, Charles B., Older, Clifford and Downs, William S. "Report on Annual Highway Costs, Province of Ontario," The Railway Association of Canada, February 21, 1938.

Breed, Charles B., Older, Clifford and Downs, William S. "Highway Costs: A Study of Highway Costs and Motor Vehicle Payments in the United States," Report to American Association of Railroads, January 30, 1939.

Breed, Charles B. "Highway Costs and Motor Vehicle Payments in Vermont," Report Ft. State Railroad Association, March I940.

== Personal life ==
Breed married and later divorced Carrie Wentworth. His second wife was Elsa Edson Breed, who died in 1957. He had three children, Charles A. Breed, David E. Breed, and Nancy Campbell.
