= Robert Stanley Breed =

U.S. biologist and microbiologist (1877–1956)

- Born: October 17, 1877; Brooklyn Township, Susquehanna County, Pennsylvania
- Died: February 10, 1956 (aged 78)
- Occupation(s): American biologist, researcher and educator

Robert Stanley Breed (October 17, 1877 – February 10, 1956) was an American biologist, born in Brooklyn, Pennsylvania. He received a bachelor's degree from Amherst College in 1898, an M.S. from the University of Colorado in 1899, and a Ph.D. from Harvard in 1902. In 1902 he became professor of biology at Allegheny College and was there secretary of the faculty in 1907–1910. He became known especially for his researches on the post-embryonic development of insects and for his contributions to scientific journals on the public milk supply. In 1903 he published The Changes which Occur in the Muscles of a Beetle during Metamorphosis.

In 1913, Breed became head of bacteriology at the New York Agricultural Experiment Station in Geneva, New York. In 1927, he served as president of the Society of American Bacteriologists. From the 1920s until his death in 1956, he was a principal editor of Bergey's Manual of Determinative Bacteriology.

== Death and interment ==
Breed died in 1956, and was buried at the Evergreen Cemetery in Brooklyn Township, Susquehanna County, Pennsylvania.
