= Breeding =

Breeding is sexual reproduction that produces offspring, usually animals or plants. It can only occur between a male and a female animal or plant.

Breeding may refer to:

- Animal husbandry, through selected specimens such as dogs, horses, and rabbits
- Breeding in the wild, the natural process of reproduction in the animal kingdom
- Sexual reproduction of plants
- Plant breeding, through specimens selected by humans for desirable traits

== Science ==
- Breeding refers to nuclear transmutations that produce fuel for further reactions, in a breeder reactor to become fissile material or in a fusion reactor to produce tritium, see Tritium § Lithium

=== Biology ===
- Breeding back, a breeding effort to re-assemble extinct breed genes
- Breeding pair, bonded animals who cooperate to produce offspring
- Breeding program, a planned breeding of animals or plants
- Breeding season, the period during each year when a species reproduces
- Captive breeding, raising plants or animals in zoos or other controlled conditions
- Cooperative breeding, the raising of the young using non-parental care givers
- Copulation (zoology)
- Crossbreeding, the process of breeding an animal with purebred parents of two different breeds, varieties, or populations
- Mating
- Preservation breeding, a selection practice to preserve bloodlines
- Selective breeding, an animal selection practice to encourage chosen qualities
- Sexual intercourse
- Smart breeding, a plant selection practice to encourage chosen qualities

== People ==
- James Floyd Breeding (1901–1977), U.S. Congressman from Kansas
- Marv Breeding (1934–2006), 1960s U.S. Major League Baseball player

== Media ==
- Breeding (EP), 2007 album by Dirty Little Rabbits
- Breeding Death, 2000 album by Bloodbath
- Breeding the Spawn, 1993 album by Suffocation
- Dust Breeding, 2001 Doctor Who television series audio play

== Places ==
- Breeding, Kentucky, a town in the United States

== See also ==
- Breeding (sex act) (kink)
- Good breeding (disambiguation)
- Hybrid (biology), breeding between dissimilar parents
- Inbreeding, breeding between close relatives
- Manners, the unenforced standards of human conduct
- Outbreeding depression, reduced fitness from breeding of unrelated individuals
- Purebred
