= Michael Breed =

Professional golf instructor

Michael S. Breed
- Born: May 14, 1962 (age 63); Greenwich, Connecticut, U.S.
- Occupation: Professional Golf Instructor

Michael S. Breed (born May 14, 1962, in Greenwich, Connecticut) is a professional golf instructor and a television host. In 2011, he was voted one of the Top 50 Instructors in America by Golf Digest. In 2012, Breed was chosen as the PGA's National Teacher of the Year. Prior to his time as a television host, Breed was the Head Golf Professional at Sunningdale Golf Club for 12 years from 2001–2012, and the Head Golf Professional at Birchwood Country Club, as well as the Assistant Professional at Deepdale Golf Club and Augusta National Golf Club. He has served on different boards for the Metropolitan PGA for over 10 years and has represented the PGA of America at the National Golf Day in Washington D.C. since 2012. He is involved in various charities, such as The First Tee; Folds of Honor; Hope for the Warriors; Wounded Warriors Foundation, and Salute Military Golf Association.

In 2008, Breed became the host for The Golf Fix on Golf Channel, an instructional television show.

Breed's first book (co-authored by Greg Midland), Picture Perfect Golf Swing: The Complete Guide to Golf Swing Video Analysis, was released by Simon & Schuster/Atria Books on May 13, 2008. He also hosted a radio show called Tee Time. Breed also contributed to writing No More Slice for Dummies. In September 2011, his second instructional book The 3-Degree Putting Solution was released by the Penguin Group. In 2014, he released the video series "Effect to Cause".

== Other career highlights ==
- 2012 PGA National Teacher of the Year
- 2009 Metropolitan PGA Teacher of the Year
- 2006 and 2007 Metropolitan PGA Horton Smith Award Winner
- Randolph-Macon College Hall of Fame Class of 2004
- 2000 Metropolitan PGA Teacher of the Year
- Played in the 1994 Greater Hartford Open on the PGA Tour
- Played a number of events on the Ben Hogan Tour (same as Korn Ferry Tour) in 1991
- Graduated from Randolph-Macon College in Ashland, Virginia in 1985

== Tour pros ==
Breed has worked with many tour pros over the years on the PGA Tour, Web.com Tour, LPGA Tour and mini tours. Players include: Shaun Micheel, James Vargas, John Kimbell, Meaghan Francella, Jay Williamson, Chris Smith, Kyle Reifers, Chris Parra, Scott Sterling, J.J. Henry, Joe Ogilvie, Bubba Dickerson, Doug Labelle, David Branshaw, Kyle Thompson, Jeff Gove, Tom Byrum, Ron Whittaker, Darron Stiles, Curt Byrum, and Kevin Johnson.
