= Breeder (slang) =

Derogatory term for people who have children

Breeder is a pejorative term coined by gay or lesbian people particularly for parents who purportedly over-focus on their children and allegedly abandon their previous friends and lifestyle; or to women who give birth to many children, often with the derisive implication that they have too many offspring. The term is also used by antinatalists to pejoratively refer to anyone who has procreated, an act which they consider immoral.

The use of "breeder" in this way is not new. It appears, for example, in Jonathan Swift's A Modest Proposal, widely acknowledged as the preeminent English satirical essay, in which Swift repeatedly uses the term.

The number of souls in this kingdom being usually reckoned one million and a half, of these I calculate there may be about two hundred thousand couple whose wives are breeders; from which number I subtract thirty thousand couples who are able to maintain their own children, although I apprehend there cannot be so many, under the present distresses of the kingdom; but this being granted, there will remain an hundred and seventy thousand breeders.

Some parents resent being referred to as "breeders", and feel that the word unduly reduces the process of child-raising to animal husbandry.

The term was part of a 2006 controversy in the heavily gay resort town of Provincetown, Massachusetts, when petitioners against same-sex marriage whose identities were published, complained of having been called "breeders". The San Francisco Chronicle described the term as "a joking or derogatory slur used by gays to describe heterosexuals".

While using the term "breeder" as a descriptive term is not new, the term has increased in use within the last decade mainly due its acceptance by pop culture and specifically youth pop culture. Some heterosexuals have said that the term "breeder" is offensive to straight people and associated it with "heterophobia" or degrading heterosexual lifestyles.

The term "breeder" has also been used to describe lesbian parents who partake in reproduction. The idea of gay parenting has led some to say that the line between "breeders" and otherwise is less clear, with the idea of LGBT families beginning to "breed". The term's connotation is a point of contention within the LGBT community. The expansion of the term to include parents within the community has created a divide on its meaning. There has been debate over its acceptability, inside and outside of LGBT circles, and whether it is a slur.
