= List of Zeugodacus species =

This is a list of species of fruit flies (Tephritidae) in the genus Zeugodacus, as of 2019.

- Zeugodacus abdoangustus (Drew 1972)
- Zeugodacus abdoaurantiacus (Drew 1989)
- Zeugodacus abdopallescens (Drew 1971)
- Zeugodacus ablepharus (Bezzi 1919)
- Zeugodacus abnormis (Hardy 1982)
- Zeugodacus absolutus (Walker 1861)
- Zeugodacus aithonota (Drew & Romig 2013)
- Zeugodacus alampetus (Drew 1989)
- Zeugodacus ambiguus (Shiraki 1933)
- Zeugodacus amoenus (Drew 1972)
- Zeugodacus analus (Chen & Zhou 2013)
- Zeugodacus anchitrichotus (Drew 1989)
- Zeugodacus angusticostatus (Drew 1989)
- Zeugodacus angustifinis (Hardy 1982)
- Zeugodacus apicalis (de Meijere 1911)
- Zeugodacus apiciflavus (Yu He & Chen 2011)
- Zeugodacus apicofemoralis (Drew & Romig 2013)
- Zeugodacus areolatus (Walker 1861)
- Zeugodacus arisanicus (Shiraki 1933)
- Zeugodacus armillatus (Hering 1938)
- Zeugodacus assamensis White 1999
- Zeugodacus atrichus (Bezzi 1919)
- Zeugodacus atrifacies (Perkins 1938)
- Zeugodacus atrisetosus (Perkins 1939)
- Zeugodacus atypicus (White & Evenhuis 1999)
- Zeugodacus aurantiventer (Drew 1989)
- Zeugodacus bakeri (Bezzi 1919)
- Zeugodacus baliensis (Drew & Romig 2013)
- Zeugodacus baoshanensis (Zhang, Ji & Chen 2011)
- Zeugodacus biguttatus (Bezzi 1916)
- Zeugodacus binoyi (Drew 2002)
- Zeugodacus bogorensis (Hardy 1983)
- Zeugodacus borongensis (Drew & Romig 2013)
- Zeugodacus brachus (Drew 1972)
- Zeugodacus brevipunctatus (David & Hancock 2017)
- Zeugodacus brevivitta (Drew & Romig 2013)
- Zeugodacus buruensis (White 1999)
- Zeugodacus buvittatus (Drew 1989)
- Zeugodacus calumniatus (Hardy 1970)
- Zeugodacus careomacula (Drew & Romig 2013)
- Zeugodacus caudatus (Fabricius 1805)
- Zeugodacus choristus (May 1962)
- Zeugodacus cilifer (Hendel 1912)
- Zeugodacus citrifuscus (Drew & Romig 2013)
- Zeugodacus citroides (Drew 1989)
- Zeugodacus complicatus (White 1999)
- Zeugodacus connexus (Hardy 1982)
- Zeugodacus cucumis (French 1907)
- Zeugodacus cucurbitae (Coquillett 1899)
- Zeugodacus curtus (Drew 1972)
- Zeugodacus daclaciae (Drew & Romig 2013)
- Zeugodacus daulus (Drew 1989)
- Zeugodacus decipiens (Drew 1972)
- Zeugodacus depressus (Shiraki 1933)
- Zeugodacus diaphoropsis (Hering 1952)
- Zeugodacus diaphorus (Hendel 1915)
- Zeugodacus dissidens (Drew 1989)
- Zeugodacus disturgidus (Yu, Deng & Chen 2012)
- Zeugodacus diversus (Coquillett 1904)
- Zeugodacus dorsirufus (Drew & Romig 2013)
- Zeugodacus dubiosus (Hardy 1982)
- Zeugodacus duplicatus (Bezzi 1916)
- Zeugodacus elegantulus (Hardy 1974)
- Zeugodacus emarginatus (Perkins 1939)
- Zeugodacus emittens (Walker 1860)
- Zeugodacus eurylomatus (Hardy 1982)
- Zeugodacus exornatus (Hering 1941)
- Zeugodacus fallacis (Drew 1972)
- Zeugodacus fereuncinatus (Drew & Romig 2013)
- Zeugodacus flavipilosus (Hardy 1982)
- Zeugodacus flavolateralis (Drew & Romig 2013)
- Zeugodacus flavopectoralis (Hering 1953)
- Zeugodacus flavoverticalis (Drew & Romig 2013)
- Zeugodacus freidbergi (White 1999)
- Zeugodacus fulvipes (Perkins 1938)
- Zeugodacus fulvoabdominalis (White & Evenhuis 1999)
- Zeugodacus fuscans (Wang 1998)
- Zeugodacus fuscipennulus (Drew & Romig 2001)
- Zeugodacus fuscoalatus (Drew & Romig 2013)
- Zeugodacus gavisus (Munro 1935)
- Zeugodacus gracilis (Drew 1972)
- Zeugodacus hamaceki (Drew & Romig 2001)
- Zeugodacus hancocki (Drew & Romig 2013)
- Zeugodacus hatyaiensis (Drew & Romig 2013)
- Zeugodacus havelockiae (Drew & Romig 2013)
- Zeugodacus heinrichi (Hering 1941)
- Zeugodacus hekouanus (Yu He & Yang 2011)
- Zeugodacus hengsawadae (Drew & Romig 2013)
- Zeugodacus hoabinhiae (Drew & Romig 2013)
- Zeugodacus hochii (Zia 1936)
- Zeugodacus hodgsoniae (Drew & Romig 2013)
- Zeugodacus hoedi (White 1999)
- Zeugodacus hululangatiae (Drew & Romig 2013)
- Zeugodacus incisus (Walker 1861)
- Zeugodacus indentus (Hardy 1974)
- Zeugodacus infestus (Enderlein 1920)
- Zeugodacus iriomotiae (Drew & Romig 2013)
- Zeugodacus ishigakiensis (Shiraki 1933)
- Zeugodacus isolatus (Hardy 1973)
- Zeugodacus javadicus (Mahmood 1999)
- Zeugodacus javanensis (Perkins 1938)
- Zeugodacus juxtuncinatus (Drew & Romig 2013)
- Zeugodacus kaghanae (Mahmood 1999)
- Zeugodacus khaoyaiae (Drew & Romig 2013)
- Zeugodacus laguniensis (Drew & Romig 2013)
- Zeugodacus lipsanus (Hendel 1915)
- Zeugodacus liquidus (Drew & Romig 2013)
- Zeugodacus longicaudatus (Perkins 1938)
- Zeugodacus longivittatus (Chua & Ooi 1998)
- Zeugodacus luteicinctutus (Ito 2011)
- Zeugodacus macrophyllae (Drew & Romig 2013)
- Zeugodacus macrovittatus (Drew 1989)
- Zeugodacus maculatus (Perkins 1938)
- Zeugodacus maculifacies (Hardy 1973)
- Zeugodacus maculifemur (Hering 1938)
- Zeugodacus madhupuri (Leblanc, Luc & Hossain, Md & Doorenweerd, Camiel & Khan, Shakil & Momen, Mahfuza & San Jose, Michael & Rubinoff, Daniel. 2019)
- Zeugodacus magnicauda (White & Evenhuis 1999)
- Zeugodacus melanofacies (Drew & Romig 2013)
- Zeugodacus melanopsis (Hardy 1982)
- Zeugodacus menglanus (Yu Liu & Yang 2011)
- Zeugodacus mesonotaitha (Drew 1989)
- Zeugodacus minimus (Hering 1952)
- Zeugodacus montanus (Hardy 1983)
- Zeugodacus mukiae (Drew & Romig 2013)
- Zeugodacus mundus (Bezzi 1919)
- Zeugodacus nakhonnayokiae (Drew & Romig 2013)
- Zeugodacus namlingiae (Drew & Romig 2013)
- Zeugodacus neoelegantulus (White 1999)
- Zeugodacus neoemittens (Drew & Romig 2013)
- Zeugodacus neoflavipilosus (Drew & Romig 2013)
- Zeugodacus neolipsanus (Drew & Romig 2013)
- Zeugodacus neopallescentis (Drew 1989)
- Zeugodacus nigrifacies (Shiraki 1933)
- Zeugodacus ochrosterna (Drew & Romig 2013)
- Zeugodacus okunii (Shiraki 1933)
- Zeugodacus pahangiae (Drew & Romig 2013)
- Zeugodacus pantabanganiae (Drew & Romig 2013)
- Zeugodacus papuaensis (Malloch 1939)
- Zeugodacus paululus (Drew 1989)
- Zeugodacus pemalangiae (Drew & Romig 2013)
- Zeugodacus perplexus (Walker 1862)
- Zeugodacus perpusillus (Drew 1971)
- Zeugodacus persignatus (Hering 1941)
- Zeugodacus platamus (Hardy 1973)
- Zeugodacus proprescutellatus (Zhang Che & Gao 2011)
- Zeugodacus pubescens (Bezzi 1919)
- Zeugodacus purus (White 1999)
- Zeugodacus quasiinfestus (Drew & Romig 2013)
- Zeugodacus reflexus (Drew 1971)
- Zeugodacus rubellus (Hardy 1973)
- Zeugodacus sabahensis (Drew & Romig 2013)
- Zeugodacus sandaracinus (Drew 1989)
- Zeugodacus sasaotiae (Drew & Romig 2013)
- Zeugodacus scutellaris (Bezzi 1913)
- Zeugodacus scutellarius (Bezzi 1916)
- Zeugodacus scutellatus (Hendel 1912)
- Zeugodacus scutellinus (Bezzi 1916)
- Zeugodacus semisurstyli Drew & Romig 2013
- Zeugodacus semongokensis (Drew & Romig 2013)
- Zeugodacus sepikae (Drew 1989)
- Zeugodacus signatifer (Tryon 1927)
- Zeugodacus signatus (Hering 1941)
- Zeugodacus sinensis (Yu Bai & Chen 2011)
- Zeugodacus singularis (Drew 1989)
- Zeugodacus sonlaiae (Drew & Romig 2013)
- Zeugodacus speciosus (Drew & Romig 2013)
- Zeugodacus spectabilis (Drew & Romig 2013)
- Zeugodacus strigifinis (Walker 1861)
- Zeugodacus sumbensis (Hering 1953)
- Zeugodacus surrufulus (Drew 1989)
- Zeugodacus synnephes (Hendel 1913)
- Zeugodacus tapervitta (Mahmood 1999)
- Zeugodacus tappanus (Shiraki 1933)
- Zeugodacus tau (Walker 1849)
- Zeugodacus tebeduiae (Drew & Romig 2013)
- Zeugodacus timorensis (Perkins 1939)
- Zeugodacus transversus (Hardy 1982)
- Zeugodacus triangularis (Drew 1968)
- Zeugodacus trichosanthes (Drew & Romig 2013)
- Zeugodacus trichotus (May 1962)
- Zeugodacus tricuspidatae (Drew & Romig 2013)
- Zeugodacus trilineatus (Hardy 1955)
- Zeugodacus trimaculatus (Hardy & Adachi 1954)
- Zeugodacus trivandrumensis (Drew & Romig 2013)
- Zeugodacus ujungpandangiae (Drew & Romig 2013)
- Zeugodacus uncinatus (Drew & Romig 2013)
- Zeugodacus unilateralis (Drew 1989)
- Zeugodacus univittatus (Drew 1972)
- Zeugodacus urens (White 1999)
- Zeugodacus vargus (Hardy 1982)
- Zeugodacus vinnulus (Hardy 1973)
- Zeugodacus vultus (Hardy 1973)
- Zeugodacus waimitaliae (Drew & Romig 2013)
- Zeugodacus watersi (Hardy 1954)
- Zeugodacus whitei (Drew & Romig 2013)
- Zeugodacus yalaensis (Drew & Romig 2013)
- Zeugodacus yoshimotoi (Hardy 1973)
- Zeugodacus zahadi (Mahmood 1999)
