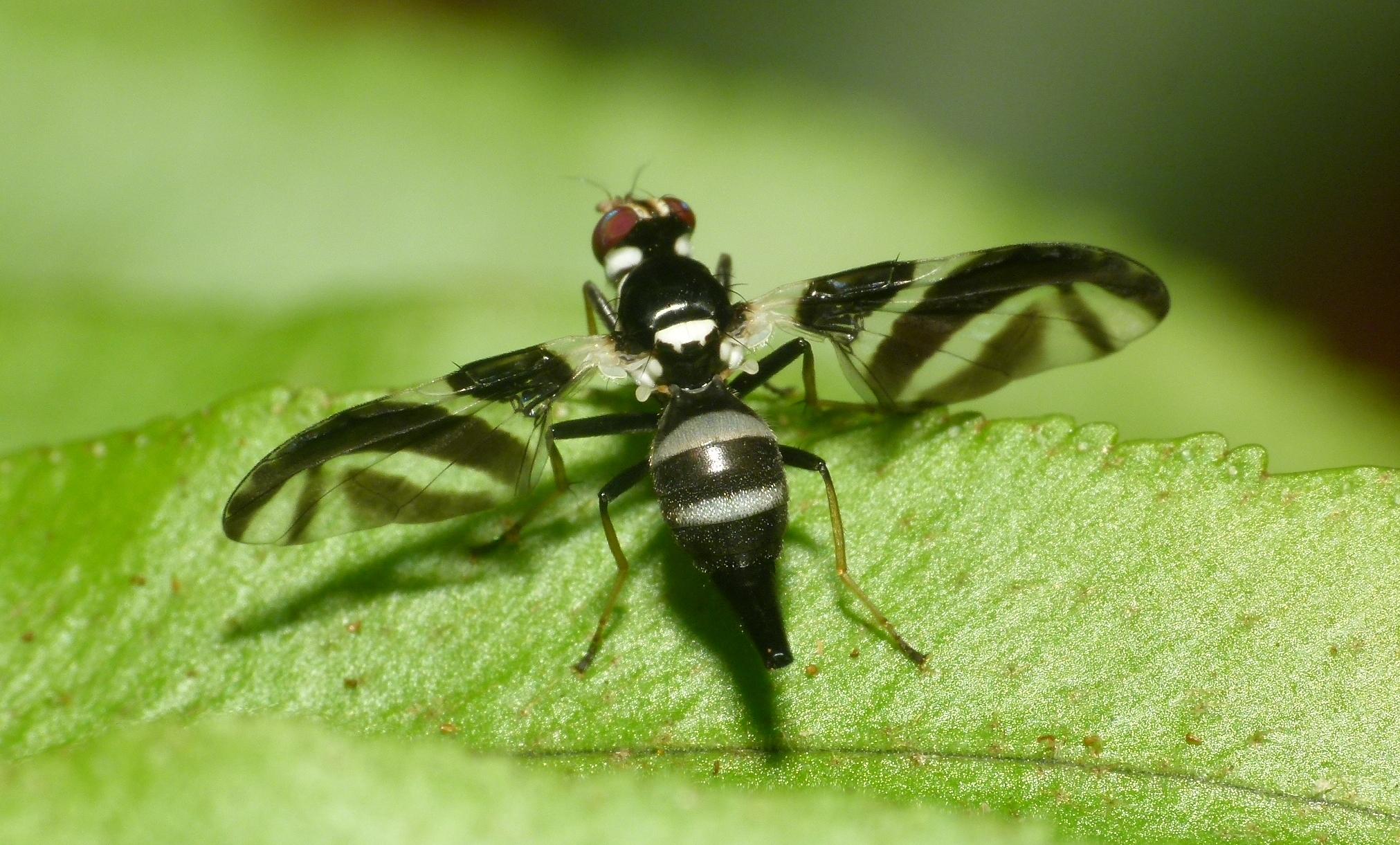
- Anoplomus cassandra (India)

Scientific classification
- Kingdom: Animalia
- Phylum: Arthropoda
- Clade: Pancrustacea
- Class: Insecta
- Order: Diptera
- Family: Tephritidae
- Tribe: Gastrozonini
- Genus: Anoplomus; Bezzi, 1913

= Anoplomus =

Genus of flies

Anoplomus is a genus of tephritid or fruit flies in the family Tephritidae found in Asia. Males court females with pheromone calling and special flight and ritualized movements. In some species small leks of males may display on vegetation. Many species feed on fruits, while some are known to feed on bamboos.

The genus is characterized by the presence of two spines on the mid tibia and the absence of pronotal bristles. They belong to the subfamily Dacinae and have been synonymized with Sinanoplomus and Proanoplomus. Seven species are included as of 2008:

- Anoplomus cassandra (Osten Sacken, 1882)
- Anoplomus fasciatus (Walker)
- Anoplomus hainanensis Wang, 1998
- Anoplomus nigrifemoratus Hardy, 1973
- Anoplomus rufipes Hardy, 1973
- Anoplomus seclusa (Hardy)
- Anoplomus sinensis (Zia)
