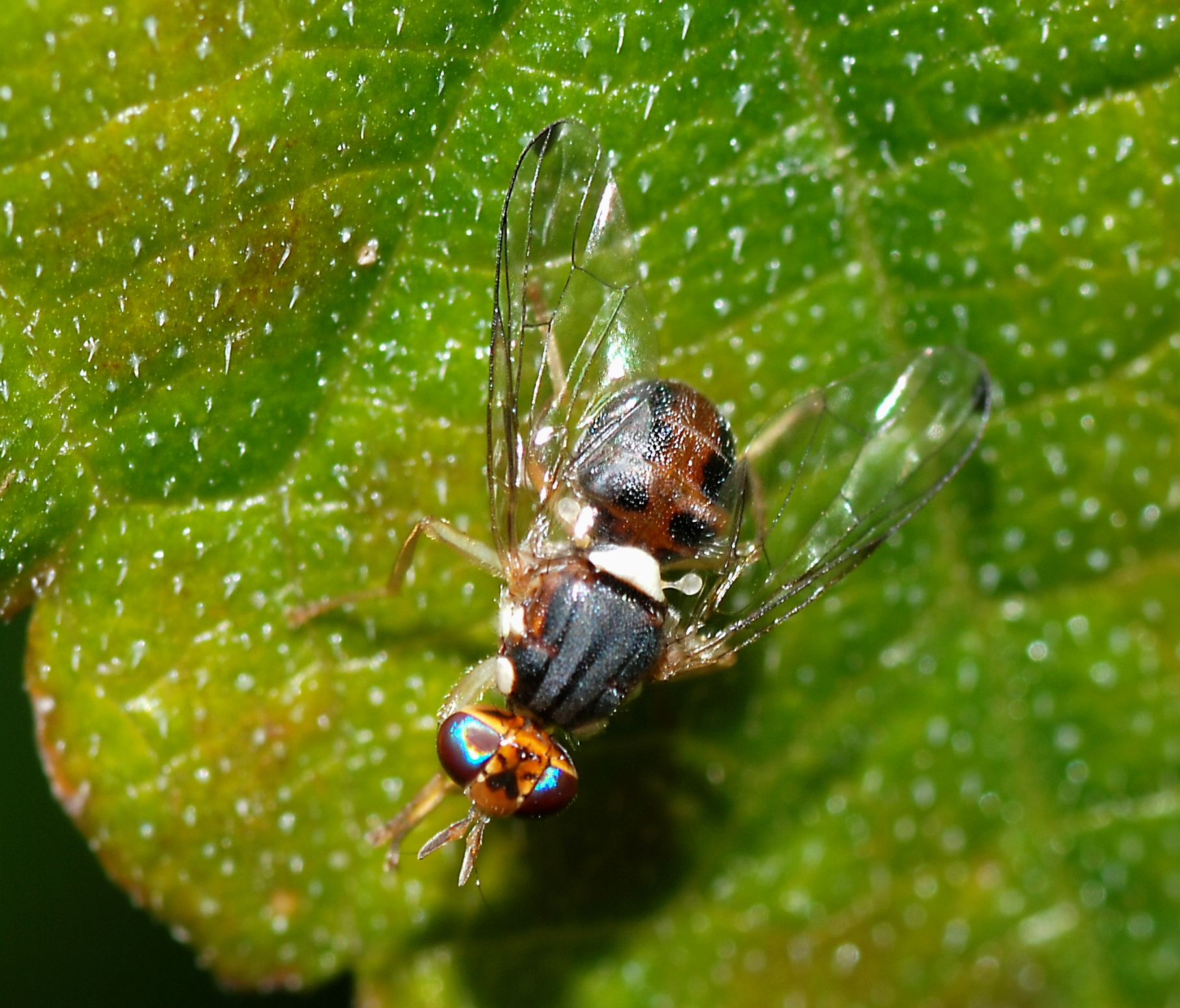
- Adult olive fruit fly

Scientific classification
- Kingdom: Animalia
- Phylum: Arthropoda
- Class: Insecta
- Order: Diptera
- Family: Tephritidae
- Subfamily: Dacinae

Diversity
- 41 genera, c. 1,000 species

= Dacinae =

Subfamily of flies

The Dacinae are a subfamily of the fruit fly family Tephritidae. Its 39 genera are distributed among three tribes:

- Tribe Ceratitidini:
  - Capparimyia
  - Carpophthoromyia
  - Ceratitella
  - Ceratitis
  - Eumictoxenus
  - Neoceratitis
  - Nippia
  - Paraceratitella
  - Paratrirhithrum
  - Perilampsis
  - Trirhithrum
  - Xanthorrachista
- Tribe Dacini:
  - Bactrocera
  - Dacus
  - Monacrostichus
  - Zeugodacus
- Tribe Gastrozonini:
  - Acroceratitis
  - Acrotaeniostola
  - Anoplomus
  - Bistrispinaria
  - Carpophthorella
  - Ceratitoides
  - Chaetellipsis
  - Chelyophora
  - Clinotaenia
  - Cyrtostola
  - Dietheria
  - Enicoptera
  - Galbifascia
  - Gastrozona
  - Ichneumonopsis
  - Leucotaeniella
  - Paragastrozona
  - Paraxarnuta
  - Phaeospila
  - Phaeospilodes
  - Proanoplomus
  - Spilocosmia
  - Taeniostola

Other genera include:

Xanthorrachis

Notes:

The genera Sinanoplomus and Rhaibophleps are no longer considered valid taxa as of 2008.
