= Trirhithrum =

Scientific classification
- Kingdom: Animalia
- Phylum: Arthropoda
- Class: Insecta
- Order: Diptera
- Family: Tephritidae
- Subfamily: Dacinae
- Genus: Trirhithrum

Genus of flies

Trirhithrum is a genus of tephritid or fruit flies in the family Tephritidae.

== Genus Trirhithrum ==
- Trirhithrum albomaculatum
- Trirhithrum albonigrum
- Trirhithrum albopleurale
- Trirhithrum argenteocuneatum
- Trirhithrum argutum
- Trirhithrum basale

(* Trirhithrum bicinctum, see below)

- Trirhithrum bimaculatum
- Trirhithrum brachypterum

(* Trirhithrum chirinda, see below. Not on CoL)

- Trirhithrum coffeae
- Trirhithrum crescentis
- Trirhithrum culcasiae
- Trirhithrum demeyeri
- Trirhithrum dimorphum
- Trirhithrum divisum
- Trirhithrum ebenum

(* Trirhithrum facetum, see below)

- Trirhithrum festivum
- Trirhithrum fraternum
- Trirhithrum gagatinum
- Trirhithrum homogeneum

(* Trirhithrum inauratipes, see below)

- Trirhithrum inscriptum
- Trirhithrum iridescens
- Trirhithrum leonense
- Trirhithrum leucopsis
- Trirhithrum manganum
- Trirhithrum meladiscum
- Trirhithrum micans
- Trirhithrum nigerrimum
- Trirhithrum nigrum
- Trirhithrum nitidum
- Trirhithrum notandum
- Trirhithrum obscurum ((Enderlein, 1911), contra Norrbom, per Hancock & White, 1997)
- Trirhithrum occipitale
- Trirhithrum ochriceps
- Trirhithrum overlaeti
- Trirhithrum psychotriae
- Trirhithrum quadrimaculatum

(* Trirhithrum queritum, see below)

- Trirhithrum resplendens
- Trirhithrum scintillans
- Trirhithrum senex
- Trirhithrum stecki
- Trirhithrum stubbsi
- Trirhithrum teres
- Trirhithrum torina
- Trirhithrum transiens
- Trirhithrum validum
- Trirhithrum viride

See others subsequently in Ceratitis (Pterandrus).

- Trirhithrum bicinctum -> Ceratitis bicincta
- "Trirhithrum chirinda" may be unpublished combination -> Trirhithromyia chirinda, later Neoceratitis chirinda, or Ceratitis chirinda

(see also alled Pterandrus curvatus -> Ceratitis curvata)

- Trirhithrum facetum -> Ceratitis faceta

(see also alled Pterandrus gravinotatus -> Ceratitis gravinotata)

- Trirhithrum inauratipes -> Ceratitis inauratipes

(see also alled Pterandrus lobata -> Ceratitis lobata) (see also alled Pterandrus pedestris -> Ceratitis pedestris) (see also alled Pterandrus podocarpi -> Ceratitis podocarpi)

- Trirhithrum queritum -> Ceratitis querita

(see also alled Pterandrus roubaudi -> Ceratitis roubaudi)
