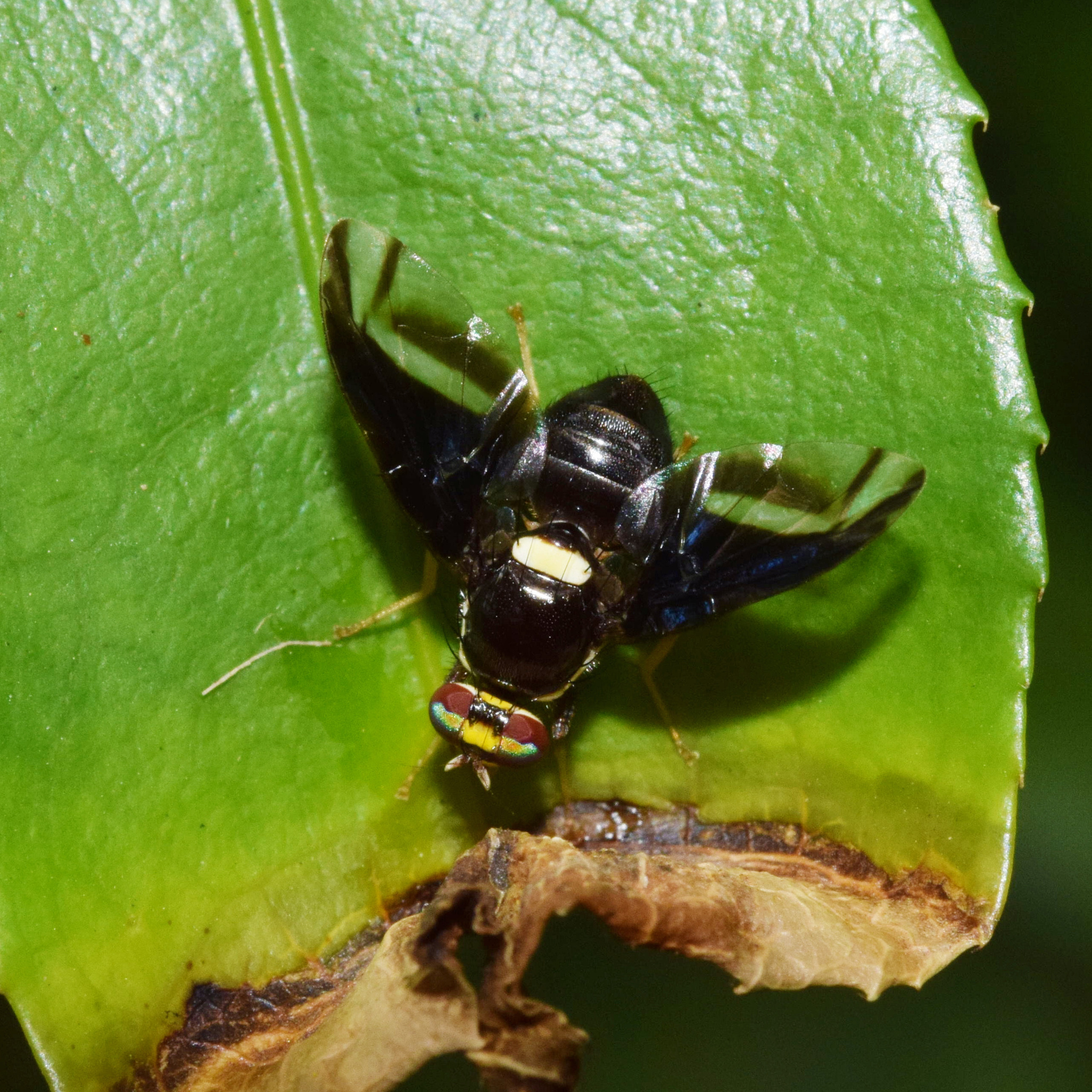

Scientific classification
- Domain: Eukaryota
- Kingdom: Animalia
- Phylum: Arthropoda
- Class: Insecta
- Order: Diptera
- Family: Tephritidae
- Subfamily: Dacinae
- Tribe: Ceratitidini
- Genus: Carpophthoromyia; Austen, 1910

= Carpophthoromyia =

Genus of flies

Carpophthoromyia is a small genus of Afrotropical picture-winged flies (Tephritidae). They are usually darkly coloured and of medium size, and mostly develop in the fruit of various species of Drypetes (Putranjivaceae, formerly Euphorbiaceae). Carpophthoromyia is closely related to Perilampsis. There are 17 recognised species:

== Species ==
- Carpophthoromyia debeckeri De Meyer, 2006
- Carpophthoromyia dimidiata Bezzi, 1924
- Carpophthoromyia dividua De Meyer, 2006
- Carpophthoromyia flavofasciata De Meyer, 2006
- Carpophthoromyia interrupta De Meyer, 2006
- Carpophthoromyia litterata (Munro, 1933)
- Carpophthoromyia nigribasis (Enderlein, 1920)
- Carpophthoromyia procera (Enderlein, 1920)
- Carpophthoromyia pseudotritea Bezzi, 1918
- Carpophthoromyia radulata De Meyer, 2006
- Carpophthoromyia schoutedeni De Meyer, 2006
- Carpophthoromyia scutellata (Walker, 1853)
- Carpophthoromyia speciosa Hancock, 1984
- Carpophthoromyia tessmanni (Enderlein, 1920)
- Carpophthoromyia tritea (Walker, 1849)
- Carpophthoromyia virgata De Meyer, 2006
- Carpophthoromyia vittata (Fabricius, 1794)
