= Gastrozona fasciata =

Scientific classification
- Kingdom: Animalia
- Phylum: Arthropoda
- Clade: Pancrustacea
- Class: Insecta
- Order: Diptera
- Family: Tephritidae
- Genus: Gastrozona
- Species: G. fasciata

Binomial name
- Gastrozona fasciata (Walker, 1856)

Species of fly

Gastrozona fasciata is a species of tephritid or fruit flies in the genus Gastrozona of the family Tephritidae.
