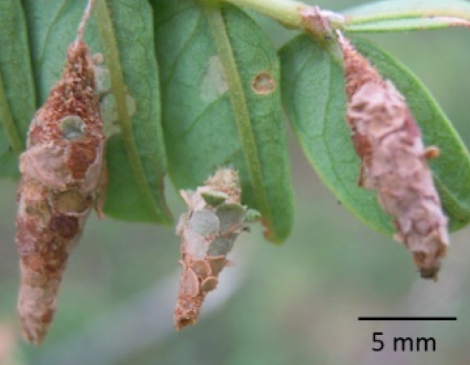
- Larval cases on Falcataria moluccana

Scientific classification
- Kingdom: Animalia
- Phylum: Arthropoda
- Clade: Pancrustacea
- Class: Insecta
- Order: Lepidoptera
- Family: Psychidae
- Genus: Pteroma
- Species: P. plagiophleps

Binomial name
- Pteroma plagiophleps Hampson, 1892

Synonyms
- Acanthopsyche (Pteroma) plagiophlebs Hampson, 1893

= Pteroma plagiophleps =

Species of moth

Pteroma plagiophleps is a moth of the family Psychidae first described by George Hampson in 1892. It is found in India, Bangladesh, Sri Lanka, and Indonesia.

== Description ==
Sexes show strong sexual dimorphism. The male has a wingspan of 14–16 mm. It is a brownish moth. Female is wingless and found within a case with a sclerotized posterior part. The fully grown larva is about 9–10 mm long and found inside a movable case. After mating, females lay eggs within its case. Each female can produce about 110 to 200 eggs. Soon after hatching, a larva starts to make a case using leaves of the host plant. Late instars move to the branches and stem of the plant and start to eat leaves and bark. Bark feeding and scorched leaf appearance is common during heavy infestation.

== Ecology ==
Larval host plants are Acacia nilotica, Delonix regia, Falcataria moluccana, Terminalia catappa, Acacia auriculiformis, Acacia mangium, Syzygium cumini, Populus deltoides, Tectona grandis, Trema orientalis and Rhizophora mucronata.
