= List of Dacus species =

This is a list of species of fruit flies (Tephritidae) in the genus Dacus, as of 2019.

- Dacus abbabae Munro 1933
- Dacus abditus (Munro 1984)
- Dacus abruptus White 2009
- Dacus absonifacies (May 1956)
- Dacus acutus White 2009
- Dacus adenae (Hering 1940)
- Dacus adenionis Munro 1984
- Dacus adustus Munro 1948
- Dacus aequalis Coquillett 1909
- Dacus africanus Adams 1905
- Dacus alarifumidus Drew 1989
- Dacus albiseta White 2009
- Dacus alulapictus Drew 1989
- Dacus amberiens (Munro 1984)
- Dacus ambonensis Drew & Hancock 1998
- Dacus amphoratus (Munro 1984)
- Dacus ancoralis Leblanc & Doorenweerd 2018
- Dacus aneuvittatus (Drew 1971)
- Dacus annulatus Becker 1903
- Dacus apectus White 2006
- Dacus apiculatus White 2006
- Dacus apostata (Hering 1937)
- Dacus apoxanthus Bezzi 1924
- Dacus arabicus White 2006
- Dacus arcuatus Munro 1939
- Dacus armatus Fabricius 1805
- Dacus aspilus Bezzi 1924
- Dacus atrimarginatus Drew & Hancock 1998
- Dacus attenuatus Collart 1935
- Dacus axanthinus White & Evenhuis 1999
- Dacus axanus (Hering 1938)
- Dacus badius Drew 1989
- Dacus bakingiliensis Hancock 1985
- Dacus bannatus Wang 1990
- Dacus basifasciatus (Hering 1941)
- Dacus bellulus Drew & Hancock 1981
- Dacus bequaerti Collart 1935
- Dacus bidens (Curran 1927)
- Dacus binotatus Loew 1862
- Dacus bispinosus (Wang 1990)
- Dacus bistrigulatus Bezzi 1908
- Dacus bivittatus (Bigot 1858)
- Dacus blepharogaster Bezzi 1917
- Dacus bombastus Hering 1941
- Dacus botianus (Munro 1984)
- Dacus brevis Coquillett 1901
- Dacus brevistriga Walker 1861
- Dacus briani White 2006
- Dacus brunnalis White 2009
- Dacus calirayae Drew & Hancock 1998
- Dacus capillaris (Drew 1972)
- Dacus carnesi (Munro 1984)
- Dacus carvalhoi (Munro 1984)
- Dacus ceropegiae (Munro 1984)
- Dacus chamun (Munro 1984)
- Dacus chapini Curran 1927
- Dacus chiwira Hancock 1985
- Dacus chrysomphalus (Bezzi 1924)
- Dacus ciliatus Loew 1862
- Dacus clinophlebs Hendel 1928
- Dacus coenensis Royer & Hancock 2012
- Dacus collarti Munro 1938
- Dacus congoensis White 2006
- Dacus conopsoides de Meijere 1911
- Dacus copelandi White 2006
- Dacus crabroniformis (Bezzi 1914)
- Dacus croceus Munro 1957
- Dacus cyathus (Munro 1984)
- Dacus delicatus Munro 1939
- Dacus deltatus White 2006
- Dacus demmerezi (Bezzi 1917)
- Dacus diastatus Munro 1984
- Dacus discipennis (Walker 1861)
- Dacus discophorus (Hering 1956)
- Dacus discors Drew 1989
- Dacus discretus Drew & Romig 2013
- Dacus disjunctus (Bezzi 1915)
- Dacus dissimilis Drew 1989
- Dacus donggaliae Drew & Romig 2013
- Dacus dorjii Drew & Romig 2007
- Dacus durbanensis Munro 1935
- Dacus eclipsis (Bezzi 1924)
- Dacus elatus White 2006
- Dacus elegans (Munro 1984)
- Dacus elutissimus Bezzi 1924
- Dacus eminus Munro 1939
- Dacus erythraeus Bezzi 1917
- Dacus esakii (Shiraki 1939)
- Dacus etiennellus Munro 1984
- Dacus externellus (Munro 1984)
- Dacus famona Hancock 1985
- Dacus fasciolatus Collart 1940
- Dacus feijeni White 1998
- Dacus ficicola Bezzi 1915
- Dacus fissuratus White 2006
- Dacus flavicrus Graham 1910
- Dacus fletcheri Drew & Romig 2007
- Dacus formosanus (Tseng & Chu 1983)
- Dacus freidbergi (Munro 1984)
- Dacus frontalis Becker 1922
- Dacus fumosus Collart 1935
- Dacus fuscatus Wiedemann 1819
- Dacus fuscinervis Malloch 1932
- Dacus fuscovittatus Graham 1910
- Dacus gabonensis White 2006
- Dacus ghesquierei Collart 1935
- Dacus goergeni De Meyer, White & Goodger 2013
- Dacus guineensis Hering 1944
- Dacus gypsoides Munro 1933
- Dacus hainanus Wang & Zhao 1989
- Dacus hamatus Bezzi 1917
- Dacus hapalus (Munro 1984)
- Dacus hardyi Drew 1979
- Dacus hargreavesi (Munro 1939)
- Dacus herensis (Munro 1984)
- Dacus humeralis (Bezzi 1915)
- Dacus hyalobasis Bezzi 1924
- Dacus iaspideus Munro 1948
- Dacus icariiformis (Enderlein 1920)
- Dacus ikelenge Hancock 1985
- Dacus impar Drew 1989
- Dacus inclytus (Munro 1984)
- Dacus indecorus (Hardy 1974)
- Dacus infernus (Hardy 1973)
- Dacus inflatus Munro 1939
- Dacus inornatus Bezzi 1908
- Dacus insolitus White 2009
- Dacus insulosus Drew & Hancock 1998
- Dacus jubatus (Munro 1984)
- Dacus kakamega White 2006
- Dacus kaplanae White 2009
- Dacus kariba Hancock 1985
- Dacus katonae Bezzi 1924
- Dacus keiseri (Hering 1956)
- Dacus kurrensis White 2009
- Dacus lagunae Drew & Hancock 1998
- Dacus langi Curran 1927
- Dacus leongi Drew & Hancock 1998
- Dacus limbipennis Macquart 1843
- Dacus linearis Collart 1935
- Dacus longicornis (Wiedemann 1830)
- Dacus longistylus Wiedemann 1830
- Dacus lotus (Bezzi 1924)
- Dacus lounsburyii Coquillett 1901
- Dacus luteovittatus White 2009
- Dacus macer Bezzi 1919
- Dacus maculipterus Drew & Hancock 1998
- Dacus madagascarensis White 2006
- Dacus magnificus White 2009
- Dacus maprikensis Drew 1989
- Dacus marshalli Bezzi 1924
- Dacus masaicus Munro 1937
- Dacus mayi (Drew 1972)
- Dacus maynei Bezzi 1924
- Dacus mediovittatus White 2006
- Dacus meladassus (Munro 1984)
- Dacus melanaspis (Munro 1984)
- Dacus melanohumeralis Drew 1989
- Dacus melanopectus Drew & Romig 2013
- Dacus merzi White 2006
- Dacus mirificus (Munro 1984)
- Dacus mochii Bezzi 1917
- Dacus mulgens Munro 1932
- Dacus murphyi Drew & Hancock 1998
- Dacus nairobensis White 2006
- Dacus namibiensis Hancock & Drew 2001
- Dacus nanggalae Drew & Hancock 1998
- Dacus nanus Collart 1940
- Dacus newmani (Perkins 1937)
- Dacus nigriscutatus White 2006
- Dacus nigrolateris White 2006
- Dacus notalaxus Munro 1984
- Dacus nummularius (Bezzi 1916)
- Dacus obesus Munro 1948
- Dacus okumuae White 2006
- Dacus ooii Drew & Hancock 1998
- Dacus opacatus Munro 1948
- Dacus ortholomatus Hardy 1982
- Dacus ostiofaciens Munro 1932
- Dacus pallidilatus Munro 1948
- Dacus palmerensis Drew 1989
- Dacus pamelae (Munro 1984)
- Dacus panpyrrhus (Munro 1984)
- Dacus parvimaculatus White 2006
- Dacus pecropsis Munro 1984
- Dacus pedunculatus (Bezzi 1919)
- Dacus pergulariae Munro 1938
- Dacus persicus Hendel 1927
- Dacus petioliforma (May 1956)
- Dacus phantoma Hering 1941
- Dacus phimis (Munro 1984)
- Dacus phloginus (Munro 1984)
- Dacus pictus (Hardy 1970)
- Dacus plagiatus Collart 1935
- Dacus pleuralis Collart 1935
- Dacus polistiformis (Senior-White 1922)
- Dacus pseudapostata White 2009
- Dacus pseudomirificus White 2009
- Dacus pulchralis White 2006
- Dacus pullescens Munro 1948
- Dacus pullus (Hardy 1982)
- Dacus punctatifrons Karsch 1887
- Dacus purpurifrons Bezzi 1924
- Dacus purus (Curran 1927)
- Dacus pusillator (Munro 1984)
- Dacus pusillus (May 1965)
- Dacus quilicii White 2006
- Dacus radmirus Hering 1941
- Dacus ramanii Drew & Hancock 1998
- Dacus rubicundus Bezzi 1924
- Dacus rufoscutellatus (Hering 1937)
- Dacus rufus Bezzi 1915
- Dacus rugatus Munro 1984
- Dacus ruslan (Hering 1941)
- Dacus rutilus Munro 1948
- Dacus sakeji Hancock 1985
- Dacus salamander (Drew & Hancock 1981)
- Dacus santongae Drew & Hancock 1998
- Dacus satanas (Hering 1939)
- Dacus scaber Loew 1862
- Dacus schoutedeni Collart 1935
- Dacus secamoneae Drew 1989
- Dacus segunii White 2006
- Dacus seguyi (Munro 1984)
- Dacus semisphaereus Becker 1903
- Dacus senegalensis White 2009
- Dacus serratus (Munro 1984)
- Dacus setilatens Munro 1984
- Dacus siamensis Drew & Hancock 1998
- Dacus signatifrons (May 1956)
- Dacus siliqualactis Munro 1939
- Dacus sinensis Wang 1990
- Dacus solomonensis Malloch 1939
- Dacus sphaeristicus Speiser 1910
- Dacus sphaeroidalis (Bezzi 1916)
- Dacus sphaerostigma (Bezzi 1924)
- Dacus spissus Munro 1984
- Dacus stentor Munro 1929
- Dacus stylifer (Bezzi 1919)
- Dacus subsessilis (Bezzi 1919)
- Dacus succaelestis Ito 2011
- Dacus taui Drew & Romig 2001
- Dacus telfaireae (Bezzi 1924)
- Dacus temnopterus Bezzi 1928
- Dacus tenebricus Munro 1938
- Dacus tenebrosus Drew & Hancock 1998
- Dacus theophrastus Hering 1941
- Dacus transitorius Collart 1935
- Dacus transversalis White 2009
- Dacus triater Munro 1937
- Dacus trigonus Bezzi 1919
- Dacus trimacula Wang 1990
- Dacus triquetrus Drew & Romig 2013
- Dacus umbeluzinus (Munro 1984)
- Dacus umbrilatus Munro 1938
- Dacus umehi White 2006
- Dacus unicolor (Hendel 1927)
- Dacus velutifrons White 2009
- Dacus venetatus Munro 1939
- Dacus vertebratus Bezzi 1908
- Dacus vespiformis (Hendel 1927)
- Dacus vestigivittatus White 2009
- Dacus viator Munro 1939
- Dacus vijaysegarani Drew & Hancock 1998
- Dacus vittatus (Hardy 1974)
- Dacus wallacei White 1998
- Dacus woodi Bezzi 1917
- Dacus xanthaspis (Munro 1984)
- Dacus xanthinus White 2009
- Dacus xanthopterus (Bezzi 1915)
- Dacus xanthopus Bezzi 1924
- Dacus yangambinus Munro 1984
- Dacus yaromi White 2009
- Dacus yemenensis White 2006
