= Dacus (Leptoxyda) =

Scientific classification
- Domain: Eukaryota
- Kingdom: Animalia
- Phylum: Arthropoda
- Class: Insecta
- Order: Diptera
- Family: Tephritidae
- Genus: Dacus
- Subgenus: Dacus (Leptoxyda); Macquart, 1835

Species
- See text

Synonyms
- Aoptodacus Munro, 1984; Athlodacus Munro, 1984; Guyodacus Munro, 1984; Janseidacus Munro, 1984; Lophodacus Collart, 1935; Nebrodacus Munro, 1984; Oligodacus Munro, 1984; Pionodacus Munro, 1984; Psilodacus Collart, 1935; Pycnodacus Munro, 1984; Saccodacus Munro, 1984; Timiodacus Munro, 1984; Xylenodacus Munro, 1984

Subgenus of flies

Dacus (Leptoxyda) is a subgenus of tephritid or fruit flies, genus Dacus, in the family Tephritidae.

== Species list ==
- Dacus annulatus
- Dacus apostata
- Dacus apoxanthus
- Dacus basifasciatus
- Dacus chamun
- Dacus chapini
- Dacus erythraeus
- Dacus externellus
- Dacus freidbergi
- Dacus hamatus
- Dacus hapalus
- Dacus hyalobasis
- Dacus iaspideus
- Dacus inclytus
- Dacus inflatus
- Dacus inornatus
- Dacus interjectus
- Dacus longistylus
- Dacus macer
- Dacus marshalli
- Dacus maynei
- Dacus meladassus
- Dacus mochii
- Dacus obesus
- Dacus persicus
- Dacus phloginus
- Dacus purpurifrons
- Dacus pusillator
- Dacus retextus
- Dacus rubicundus
- Dacus rufoscutellatus
- Dacus rufus
- Dacus ruslan
- Dacus scaber
- Dacus seguyi
- Dacus semisphaereus
- Dacus sicatoluteus
- Dacus temnopterus
- Dacus triater
- Dacus umbrilatus
- Dacus woodi
- Dacus xanthopus
- Dacus zavattarii
