= Perilampsis miratrix =

Scientific classification
- Kingdom: Animalia
- Phylum: Arthropoda
- Class: Insecta
- Order: Diptera
- Family: Tephritidae
- Genus: Perilampsis
- Species: P. miratrix

Binomial name
- Perilampsis miratrix Munro, 1939

Species of fly

Perilampsis miratrix is a species of tephritid or fruit flies in the genus Perilampsis of the family Tephritidae.
