= Dacus aequalis =

Scientific classification
- Kingdom: Animalia
- Phylum: Arthropoda
- Class: Insecta
- Order: Diptera
- Family: Tephritidae
- Genus: Dacus
- Species: D. aequalis

Binomial name
- Dacus aequalis Coquillett, 1909

Fruit fly species

Dacus aequalis is a species of tephritid or fruit flies in the genus Dacus of the family Tephritidae.The species was described by Coquillett, 1909.

== Distribution ==
Eastern Australia. The type locality is Tuggerah Lakes, near Gosford, New South Wales.
