= Paratrirhithrum =

Scientific classification
- Kingdom: Animalia
- Phylum: Arthropoda
- Class: Insecta
- Order: Diptera
- Family: Tephritidae
- Subfamily: Dacinae
- Tribe: Ceratitidini
- Genus: Paratrirhithrum; Shiraki, 1933

Genus of flies

Paratrirhithrum is a genus of tephritid or fruit flies in the family Tephritidae.

== Species ==
The genus includes the following species.

- Paratrirhithrum nitidum
- Paratrirhithrum nitobae
