= Perilampsis furcata =

Scientific classification
- Kingdom: Animalia
- Phylum: Arthropoda
- Class: Insecta
- Order: Diptera
- Family: Tephritidae
- Genus: Perilampsis
- Species: P. furcata

Binomial name
- Perilampsis furcata Munro, 1969

Species of fly

Perilampsis furcata is a species of tephritid or fruit flies in the genus Perilampsis of the family Tephritidae.
