= Ceratitella nitida =

Scientific classification
- Kingdom: Animalia
- Phylum: Arthropoda
- Class: Insecta
- Order: Diptera
- Family: Tephritidae
- Genus: Ceratitella
- Species: C. nitida

Binomial name
- Ceratitella nitida (Hardy, 1973)

Species of fly

Ceratitella nitida is a species of tephritid or fruit flies in the genus Ceratitella of the family Tephritidae.
