= Capparimyia melanaspis =

Scientific classification
- Kingdom: Animalia
- Phylum: Arthropoda
- Clade: Pancrustacea
- Class: Insecta
- Order: Diptera
- Family: Tephritidae
- Genus: Capparimyia
- Species: C. melanaspis

Binomial name
- Capparimyia melanaspis (Bezzi, 1920)

Fruit fly species

Capparimyia melanaspis is a species of tephritid or fruit flies in the genus Capparimyia of the family Tephritidae.
