= Acroceratitis flava =

Scientific classification
- Kingdom: Animalia
- Phylum: Arthropoda
- Clade: Pancrustacea
- Class: Insecta
- Order: Diptera
- Family: Tephritidae
- Genus: Acroceratitis
- Species: A. flava

Binomial name
- Acroceratitis flava Premlata & Singh, 1988

Species of fly

Acroceratitis flava is a species of fly in the genus Acroceratitis of the family Tephritidae.

== Taxonomy ==
It was first scientifically described in 1988 by Premlata and Singh.
