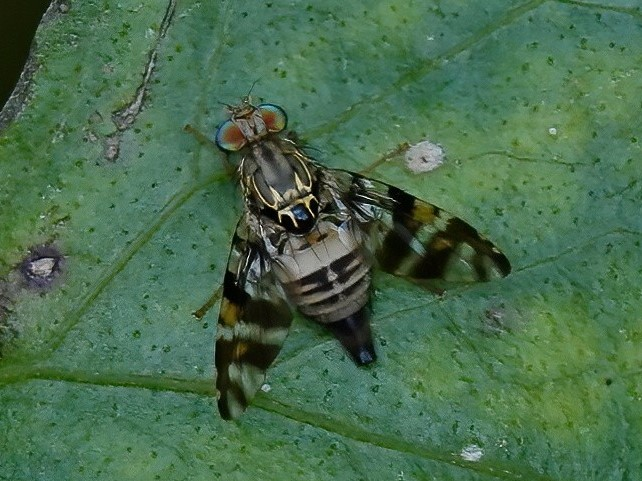
- Acroceratitis plumosa

Scientific classification
- Kingdom: Animalia
- Phylum: Arthropoda
- Clade: Pancrustacea
- Class: Insecta
- Order: Diptera
- Family: Tephritidae
- Tribe: Gastrozonini
- Genus: Acroceratitis; Hendel, 1913

Synonyms
- Acroceratis Shinji, 1940; Stictaspis Bezzi, 1913

= Acroceratitis =

Genus of flies

Acroceratitis is a genus of tephritid or fruit flies in the family Tephritidae.

== Species ==
The following species are recognised in the genus 'Acroceratitis:

- Acroceratitis bilineata (Meijere, 1914)
- Acroceratitis bimacula Hardy, 1973
- Acroceratitis biseta Wang, 1996
- Acroceratitis breviscapa David, Ramani & Hancock
- Acroceratitis ceratitina (Bezzi, 1913)
- Acroceratitis clavifera (Hering, 1938)
- Acroceratitis cognata Hardy, 1973
- Acroceratitis flava Premlata & Singh, 1988
- Acroceratitis gladiella (Munro, 1938)
- Acroceratitis hardyi Hancock & Drew, 1999
- Acroceratitis histrionica (Meijere, 1914)
- Acroceratitis incompleta Hardy, 1973
- Acroceratitis maculata Premlata & Singh, 1988
- Acroceratitis nigrifacies Meijere, 1924
- Acroceratitis parastriata David & Hancock
- Acroceratitis plumosa Hendel, 1913
- Acroceratitis separata (Bezzi, 1913)
- Acroceratitis septemmaculata Hardy, 1973
- Acroceratitis siamensis (Munro, 1935)
- Acroceratitis similis Hardy, 1973
- Acroceratitis striata (Froggatt, 1909)
- Acroceratitis tenmalaica Hancock & Drew, 1999
- Acroceratitis tomentosa Hardy, 1973
- BOLD:ADR5269 (Acroceratitis sp.)
