= Zeugodacus madhupuri =

Scientific classification
- Domain: Eukaryota
- Kingdom: Animalia
- Phylum: Arthropoda
- Class: Insecta
- Order: Diptera
- Family: Tephritidae
- Genus: Zeugodacus
- Species: Z. madhupuri

Binomial name
- Zeugodacus madhupuri Leblanc, Luc & Hossain, Md & Doorenweerd, Camiel & Khan, Shakil & Momen, Mahfuza & San Jose, Michael & Rubinoff, Daniel. (2019)

Species of fly

Zeugodacus madhupuri is a species of fruit fly that was discovered in Madhupur National Park.

A group of researchers from Bangladesh and the United States ran research project in Bangladesh from 2013. In September 2018 they found a new species of fruit fly in Madhupur National Park. The name of the fruit fly was named after Madhupur National Park as Zeugodacus madhupuri.
