= Dacus (Metidacus) =

Scientific classification
- Domain: Eukaryota
- Kingdom: Animalia
- Phylum: Arthropoda
- Class: Insecta
- Order: Diptera
- Family: Tephritidae
- Genus: Dacus
- Subgenus: Dacus (Metidacus); Munro, 1938

Species
- Dacus adenae; Dacus amberiens; Dacus bidens; Dacus delicatus; Dacus herensis; Dacus lotus; Dacus partus; Dacus pergulariae; Dacus phimis; Dacus purus; Dacus radmirus; Dacus rutilus; Dacus stylifer

Synonyms
- Andriadacus Munro, 1984; Anomoiodacus Munro, 1984; Coccinodacus Munro, 1984

Subgenus of flies

Dacus (Metidacus) is a subgenus of fruit flies in the family Tephritidae.
