= Acroceratitis striata =

Scientific classification
- Kingdom: Animalia
- Phylum: Arthropoda
- Clade: Pancrustacea
- Class: Insecta
- Order: Diptera
- Family: Tephritidae
- Genus: Acroceratitis
- Species: A. striata

Binomial name
- Acroceratitis striata (Froggatt, 1909)

Species of fly

Acroceratitis striata is a species of fly in the genus Acroceratitis of the family Tephritidae.

== History ==
It was first scientifically described in 1909 by Walter Wilson Froggatt.
