= Paraceratitella eurycephala =

Scientific classification
- Kingdom: Animalia
- Phylum: Arthropoda
- Class: Insecta
- Order: Diptera
- Family: Tephritidae
- Genus: Paraceratitella
- Species: P. eurycephala

Binomial name
- Paraceratitella eurycephala Hardy, 1967

Species of fly

Paraceratitella eurycephala is a species of tephritid or fruit flies in the genus Paraceratitella of the family Tephritidae.
