= Monacrostichus =

Scientific classification
- Kingdom: Animalia
- Phylum: Arthropoda
- Clade: Pancrustacea
- Class: Insecta
- Order: Diptera
- Family: Tephritidae
- Subfamily: Dacinae
- Tribe: Dacini
- Genus: Monacrostichus; Bezzi, 1914

Species
- M. citricola M. malaysiae

Genus of flies

Monacrostichus is a small Asian genus of tephritid or fruit flies in the family Tephritidae.
