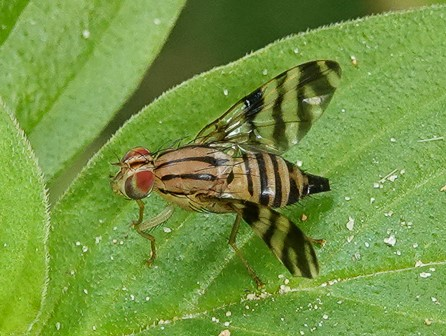
- Taeniostola vittigera

Scientific classification
- Kingdom: Animalia
- Phylum: Arthropoda
- Clade: Pancrustacea
- Class: Insecta
- Order: Diptera
- Family: Tephritidae
- Subfamily: Dacinae
- Tribe: Gastrozonini
- Genus: Taeniostola; Bezzi, 1913

= Taeniostola =

Genus of flies

Taeniostola is a genus of tephritid or fruit flies in the family Tephritidae.
