= Ceratitella schlingeri =

Scientific classification
- Kingdom: Animalia
- Phylum: Arthropoda
- Class: Insecta
- Order: Diptera
- Family: Tephritidae
- Genus: Ceratitella
- Species: C. schlingeri

Binomial name
- Ceratitella schlingeri Norrbom and Hancock, 2004

Species of fly

Ceratitella schlingeri is a species of tephritid or fruit flies in the genus Ceratitella of the family Tephritidae.
