= Carpophthoromyia vittata =

Scientific classification
- Kingdom: Animalia
- Phylum: Arthropoda
- Clade: Pancrustacea
- Class: Insecta
- Order: Diptera
- Family: Tephritidae
- Genus: Carpophthoromyia
- Species: C. vittata

Binomial name
- Carpophthoromyia vittata (Fabricius, 1794)

Species of fly

Carpophthoromyia vittata is a species of tephritid or fruit flies in the genus Carpophthoromyia of the family Tephritidae.
