= Enicoptera =

Scientific classification
- Domain: Eukaryota
- Kingdom: Animalia
- Phylum: Arthropoda
- Class: Insecta
- Order: Diptera
- Family: Tephritidae
- Subfamily: Dacinae
- Tribe: Gastrozonini
- Genus: Enicoptera; Macquart, 1848

Synonyms
- Henicoptera Loew, 1873

Genus of flies

Enicoptera is a genus of tephritid or fruit flies in the family Tephritidae.
