= Eumictoxenus leleupi =

Scientific classification
- Kingdom: Animalia
- Phylum: Arthropoda
- Class: Insecta
- Order: Diptera
- Family: Tephritidae
- Genus: Eumictoxenus
- Species: E. leleupi

Binomial name
- Eumictoxenus leleupi Munro, 1962

Species of fly

Eumictoxenus leleupi is a species of tephritid or fruit flies in the genus Eumictoxenus of the family Tephritidae.
