= Carpophthoromyia tessmanni =

Scientific classification
- Kingdom: Animalia
- Phylum: Arthropoda
- Clade: Pancrustacea
- Class: Insecta
- Order: Diptera
- Family: Tephritidae
- Genus: Carpophthoromyia
- Species: C. tessmanni

Binomial name
- Carpophthoromyia tessmanni (Enderlein, 1920)

Species of insect

Carpophthoromyia tessmanni is a species of tephritid or fruit flies in the genus Carpophthoromyia of the family Tephritidae.
