= Eumictoxenus =

Scientific classification
- Kingdom: Animalia
- Phylum: Arthropoda
- Clade: Pancrustacea
- Class: Insecta
- Order: Diptera
- Family: Tephritidae
- Subfamily: Dacinae
- Genus: Eumictoxenus

Genus of flies

Eumictoxenus is a genus of Tephritid or fruit flies in the family Tephritidae.

== Species ==
- Eumictoxenus leleupi
