= Carpophthoromyia scutellata =

Scientific classification
- Kingdom: Animalia
- Phylum: Arthropoda
- Class: Insecta
- Order: Diptera
- Family: Tephritidae
- Genus: Carpophthoromyia
- Species: C. scutellata

Binomial name
- Carpophthoromyia scutellata (Walker, 1853)

Species of fly

Carpophthoromyia scutellata is a species of tephritid or fruit flies in the genus Carpophthoromyia of the family Tephritidae.
