= Capparimyia =

Scientific classification
- Kingdom: Animalia
- Phylum: Arthropoda
- Clade: Pancrustacea
- Class: Insecta
- Order: Diptera
- Family: Tephritidae
- Subfamily: Dacinae
- Tribe: Ceratitidini
- Genus: Capparimyia; Bezzi, 1920

Genus of flies

Capparimyia is a genus of tephritid or fruit flies in the family Tephritidae.

== Species ==
- Capparimyia aenigma De Meyer & Friedburg, 2005 – Tanzania
- Capparimyia aristata De Meyer & Friedburg, 2005 – Malawi [*]
- Capparimyia bipustulata (Bezzi, 1923) – Chad, Zimbabwe, Congo, etc.
- Capparimyia maeruae De Meyer & Friedburg, 2005 – Kenya
- Capparimyia melanaspis (Bezzi, 1920) – South Africa, Namibia, etc.
- Capparimyia mirabilis De Meyer & Friedburg, 2005 – Ethiopia
- Capparimyia savastani De Meyer & Friedburg, 2005 – Italy, Algeria, Egypt, etc.
- Capparimyia spatulata De Meyer & Friedburg, 2005 – Ethiopia

(* = nom. nov. for Capparimyia bipustulata (Bezzi, 1924) from protonym Pardalaspis bipustulata Bezzi, 1924)
