= Ceratitella =

Scientific classification
- Kingdom: Animalia
- Phylum: Arthropoda
- Clade: Pancrustacea
- Class: Insecta
- Order: Diptera
- Family: Tephritidae
- Subfamily: Dacinae
- Tribe: Ceratitidini
- Genus: Ceratitella; Malloch, 1939

Genus of flies

Ceratitella is a genus of tephritid or fruit flies in the family Tephritidae.

== Species ==
- Ceratitella amyemae Permkam & Hancock, 1995
- Ceratitella bifasciata Hardy, 1967
- Ceratitella inthanona Hancock & McGuire, 2002
- Ceratitella loranthi (Froggatt, 1911)
- Ceratitella nitida (Hardy, 1973)
- Ceratitella recondita Permkam & Hancock, 1995
- Ceratitella schlingeri Norrbom & Hancock, 2004
- Ceratitella sobrina (Zia, 1937)
- Ceratitella solomonensis Hancock & Drew, 2003
- Ceratitella tomentosa (Meijere, 1914)
- Ceratitella unifasciata Hardy, 1967
