= Galbifascia =

Scientific classification
- Kingdom: Animalia
- Phylum: Arthropoda
- Class: Insecta
- Order: Diptera
- Family: Tephritidae
- Subfamily: Dacinae
- Genus: Galbifascia

Genus of flies

Galbifascia is a genus of Tephritid or fruit flies in the family Tephritidae.
