= Cyrtostola =

Scientific classification
- Kingdom: Animalia
- Phylum: Arthropoda
- Clade: Pancrustacea
- Class: Insecta
- Order: Diptera
- Family: Tephritidae
- Subfamily: Dacinae
- Genus: Cyrtostola; Hancock, 1999

Genus of flies

Cyrtostola is a monotypic genus of Tephritid fruit flies in the family Tephritidae. Its only species is Cyrtostola limbata (Hendel, 1915)
