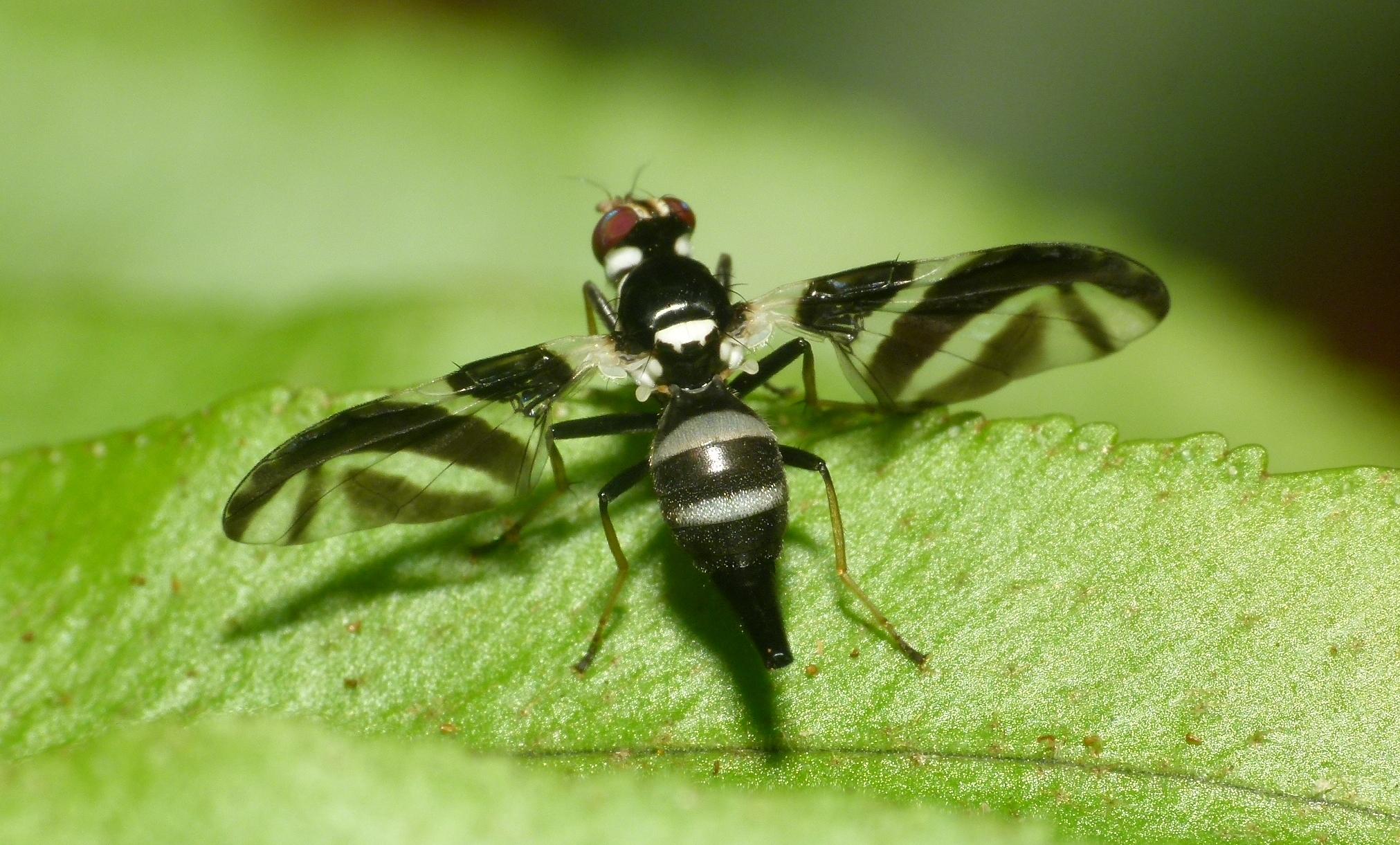
- Anoplomus cassandra (India)

Scientific classification
- Kingdom: Animalia
- Phylum: Arthropoda
- Class: Insecta
- Order: Diptera
- Family: Tephritidae
- Genus: Anoplomus
- Species: A. cassandra

Binomial name
- Anoplomus cassandra (Osten Sacken, 1882)

Synonyms
- Trypeta cassandra

= Anoplomus cassandra =

Species of fly

Anoplomus cassandra is a species of tephritid or fruit flies in the genus Anoplomus of the family Tephritidae.
