= Nippia alboscutellata =

Scientific classification
- Kingdom: Animalia
- Phylum: Arthropoda
- Class: Insecta
- Order: Diptera
- Family: Tephritidae
- Genus: Nippia
- Species: N. alboscutellata

Binomial name
- Nippia alboscutellata Munro, 1929

Species of fly

Nippia alboscutellata is a species of tephritid or fruit flies in the genus Nippia of the family Tephritidae.
