= Neoceratitis asiatica =

Scientific classification
- Kingdom: Animalia
- Phylum: Arthropoda
- Class: Insecta
- Order: Diptera
- Family: Tephritidae
- Genus: Neoceratitis
- Species: N. asiatica

Binomial name
- Neoceratitis asiatica (Becker, 1908)

Species of fly

Neoceratitis asiatica is a species of tephritid or fruit flies in the genus Neoceratitis of the family Tephritidae.
