= Paratrirhithrum nitobae =

Scientific classification
- Kingdom: Animalia
- Phylum: Arthropoda
- Class: Insecta
- Order: Diptera
- Family: Tephritidae
- Genus: Paratrirhithrum
- Species: P. nitobae

Binomial name
- Paratrirhithrum nitobae Chen, 1948

Species of fly

Paratrirhithrum nitobae is a species of tephritid or fruit flies in the genus Paratrirhithrum of the family Tephritidae.
