= Ceratitella tomentosa =

Scientific classification
- Kingdom: Animalia
- Phylum: Arthropoda
- Class: Insecta
- Order: Diptera
- Family: Tephritidae
- Genus: Ceratitella
- Species: C. tomentosa

Binomial name
- Ceratitella tomentosa (Meijere, 1914)

Species of fly

Ceratitella tomentosa is a species of tephritid or fruit flies in the genus Ceratitella of the family Tephritidae.
