= Neoceratitis =

Scientific classification
- Domain: Eukaryota
- Kingdom: Animalia
- Phylum: Arthropoda
- Class: Insecta
- Order: Diptera
- Family: Tephritidae
- Subfamily: Dacinae
- Tribe: Ceratitidini
- Genus: Neoceratitis; Hendel, 1927

Genus of flies

Neoceratitis is a genus of tephritid or fruit flies in the family Tephritidae.

== Species ==
The genus includes the following species.

- Neoceratitis asiatica (Becker, 1907) –
- Neoceratitis chirinda (Hancock, 1985) –
- Neoceratitis cyanescens (Bezzi, 1923) –
- Neoceratitis efflatouni (Hendel, 1931) –
- Neoceratitis flavoscutellata Merz & Dawah, 2005 –
- Neoceratitis lycii (Coquillett, 1901) –

(See also Neoceratitis minima (Bezzi, 1924) as junior synonym of Neoceratitis lycii in De Meyer & Freidberg 2012).
