= Proanoplomus tenompokensis =

Scientific classification
- Kingdom: Animalia
- Phylum: Arthropoda
- Class: Insecta
- Order: Diptera
- Family: Tephritidae
- Genus: Proanoplomus
- Species: P. tenompokensis

Binomial name
- Proanoplomus tenompokensis Hancock, 2008

Synonyms
- Synonymy: Proanoplomus cinereofasciatus Hardy, 1988; Pardalaspinus cinereofasciatus Hancock & Drew, 1994; Ceratitoides cinereofasciatus Hancock, 1999; Proanoplomus cinereofasciatus Kovac et al., 2006

Species of fly

Proanoplomus tenompokensis is a species of fruit fly in the family Tephritidae. It is found Malaysia.

== Description ==
The species is known from a single male specimen collected in 1959. The body is 5.5 mm. (0.22 in.) long and the wing is 6 mm. (0.24 in). It is distinguished from the similar species P. cinereofasciatus, P. formosanus, and P. nigroscutellatus by having dark brown to black postpronotal lobes with yellow margins.

== Distribution ==
It has only been found in Sabah, Eastern Malaysia.

== Etymology ==
Part of the label on the holotype says: "British N. Borneo, Tenompok", which is the type locality from which the name is derived. The latin suffix "-ensis" means "pertaining to" or "originating in".
