= Paraceratitella =

Scientific classification
- Kingdom: Animalia
- Phylum: Arthropoda
- Class: Insecta
- Order: Diptera
- Family: Tephritidae
- Subfamily: Dacinae
- Tribe: Ceratitidini
- Genus: Paraceratitella; Hardy, 1967

Genus of flies

Paraceratitella is a genus of tephritid or fruit flies in the family Tephritidae.

== Species ==
The genus contains the following species.

- Paraceratitella compta
- Paraceratitella connexa
- Paraceratitella eurycephala
- Paraceratitella oblonga
