= Neoceratitis efflatouni =

Scientific classification
- Kingdom: Animalia
- Phylum: Arthropoda
- Class: Insecta
- Order: Diptera
- Family: Tephritidae
- Genus: Neoceratitis
- Species: N. efflatouni

Binomial name
- Neoceratitis efflatouni (Hendel, 1931)

Species of fly

Neoceratitis efflatouni is a species of tephritid or fruit flies in the genus Neoceratitis of the family Tephritidae.
