= Chelyophora =

Scientific classification
- Kingdom: Animalia
- Phylum: Arthropoda
- Class: Insecta
- Order: Diptera
- Family: Tephritidae
- Subfamily: Dacinae
- Genus: Chelyophora; Rondani, 1875

Type species
- Chelyophora borneana Rondani, 1875

Genus of flies

Chelyophora is a genus of tephritid or fruit flies in the family Tephritidae.
