= Perilampsis diademata =

Scientific classification
- Kingdom: Animalia
- Phylum: Arthropoda
- Clade: Pancrustacea
- Class: Insecta
- Order: Diptera
- Family: Tephritidae
- Genus: Perilampsis
- Species: P. diademata

Binomial name
- Perilampsis diademata Bezzi, 1924

Species of fly

Perilampsis diademata is a species of tephritid or fruit flies in the genus Perilampsis of the family Tephritidae.
