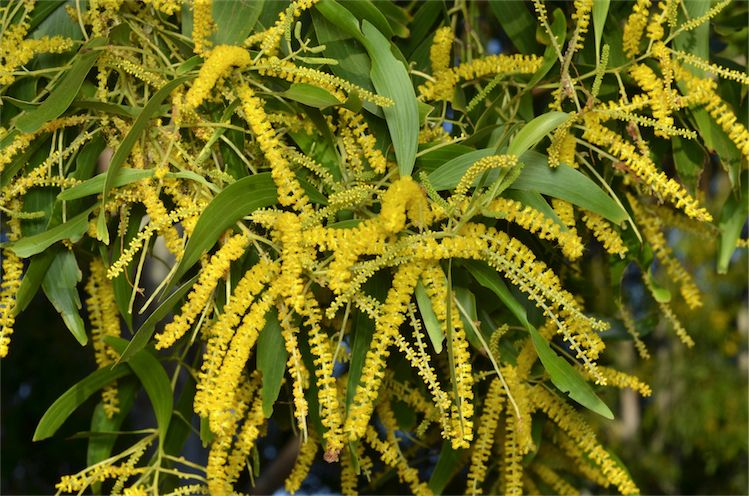

Conservation status
- Least Concern (IUCN 3.1)

Scientific classification
- Kingdom: Plantae
- Clade: Tracheophytes
- Clade: Angiosperms
- Clade: Eudicots
- Clade: Rosids
- Order: Fabales
- Family: Fabaceae
- Subfamily: Caesalpinioideae
- Clade: Mimosoid clade
- Genus: Acacia
- Species: A. auriculiformis

Binomial name
- Acacia auriculiformis A.Cunn. ex Benth.

Synonyms
- Acacia auriculaeformis Benth. orth. var.; Racosperma auriculiforme (Benth.) Pedley

= Acacia auriculiformis =

Ear-pod wattle

Species of legume

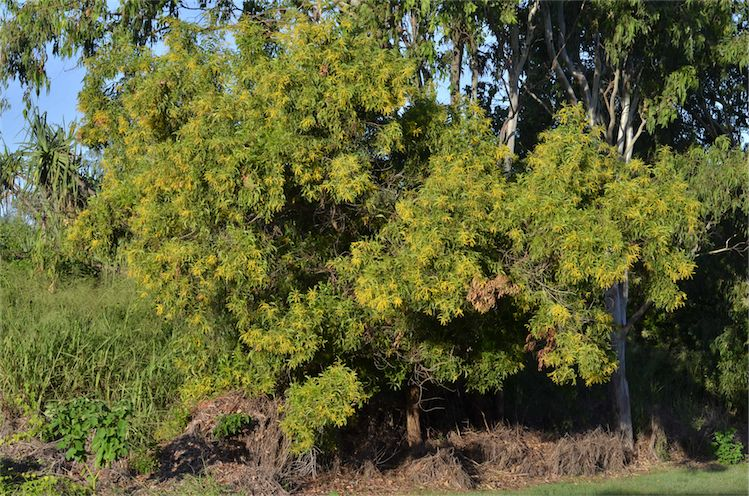
Habit north-east of Ayr

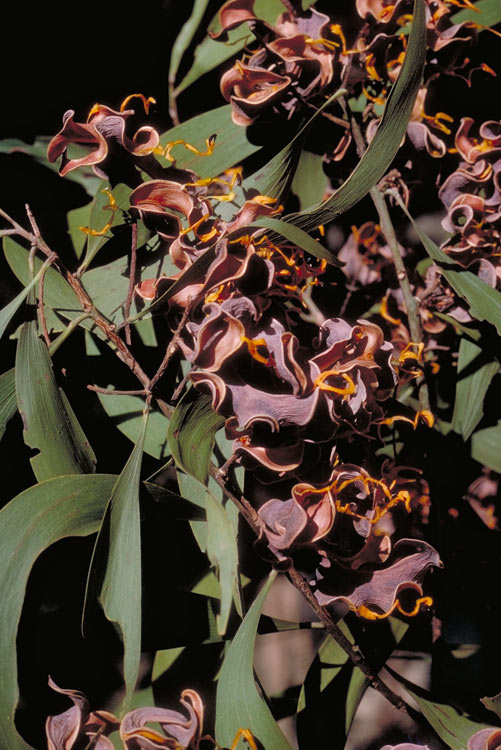
Pods

Acacia auriculiformis, commonly known as ear-pod wattle, northern black wattle or Darwin black wattle, is a species of flowering plant in the family Fabaceae and is native to Maluku, New Guinea, the Northern Territory and Queensland. It is a tree with smooth bark, very narrowly elliptic phyllodes, spikes of bright yellow to golden-yellow flowers, and strongly curved to spirally coiled, leathery to woody pods up to 80 mm (3.1 in) long.

== Description ==
Acacia auriculiformis is a tree that typically grows to 8–10 m (26–33 ft) high, rarely up to 35 m (115 ft), and is mostly glabrous, with smooth bark or fissured bark on older trees, and thin branchlets. The phyllodes are very narrowly elliptic, sometimes curved, mostly 100–200 mm (3.9–7.9 in) long and 12–40 mm (0.47–1.57 in) wide with many longitudinal veins, three to five more prominent than the rest. The flowers are bright yellow to golden-yellow, arranged in one to several spikes in leaf axils, each spike 50–85 mm (2.0–3.3 in) long on a peduncle 4–8 mm (0.16–0.31 in) long. Flowering occurs from February to August, and the fruit is a strongly curved or spirally coiled, sometimes twisted, thickly leathery to woody pod about 50–80 mm (2.0–3.1 in) long and 10–18 mm (0.39–0.71 in) wide, containing flattened, dark brown to black seeds 4–6 mm (0.16–0.24 in) long and 3–4 mm (0.12–0.16 in) wide with an orange, yellow or red aril.

== Taxonomy ==
Acacia auriculiformis was first formally described in 1842 by George Bentham in Hooker's London Journal of Botany, from an unpublished description by Allan Cunningham. The specific epithet (auriculiformis) means 'ear shaped', referring to the pods.

== Distribution and habitat ==
Ear-pod wattle grows in sandy or loamy soils near watercourses and swamps in open forest on Cape York Peninsula in Queensland, the north of the Northern Territory, the Central and Western Provinces of New Guinea, and the Kei Islands of Indonesia. It is also recorded as naturalised in Western Australia.

== Uses ==
Extracts of Acacia auriculiformis heartwood inhibit fungi that attack wood. Aqueous extracts of A. auriculiformis show developmental inhibitory effects on Bactrocera cucurbitae (the melon fly).
