= Dietheria =

Scientific classification
- Kingdom: Animalia
- Phylum: Arthropoda
- Clade: Pancrustacea
- Class: Insecta
- Order: Diptera
- Family: Tephritidae
- Subfamily: Dacinae
- Genus: Dietheria

Genus of flies

Dietheria is a monotypic genus of Tephritid fruit flies in the family Tephritidae. The only species is Dietheria fasciata.
