= Neoceratitis cyanescens =

Scientific classification
- Kingdom: Animalia
- Phylum: Arthropoda
- Clade: Pancrustacea
- Class: Insecta
- Order: Diptera
- Family: Tephritidae
- Genus: Neoceratitis
- Species: N. cyanescens

Binomial name
- Neoceratitis cyanescens (Bezzi, 1923)

Species of fly

Neoceratitis cyanescens is a species of tephritid or fruit flies in the genus Neoceratitis of the family Tephritidae.
