= Paraceratitella oblonga =

Scientific classification
- Kingdom: Animalia
- Phylum: Arthropoda
- Clade: Pancrustacea
- Class: Insecta
- Order: Diptera
- Family: Tephritidae
- Genus: Paraceratitella
- Species: P. oblonga

Binomial name
- Paraceratitella oblonga Hardy, 1967

Species of fly

Paraceratitella oblonga is a species of tephritid or fruit flies in the genus Paraceratitella of the family Tephritidae.
