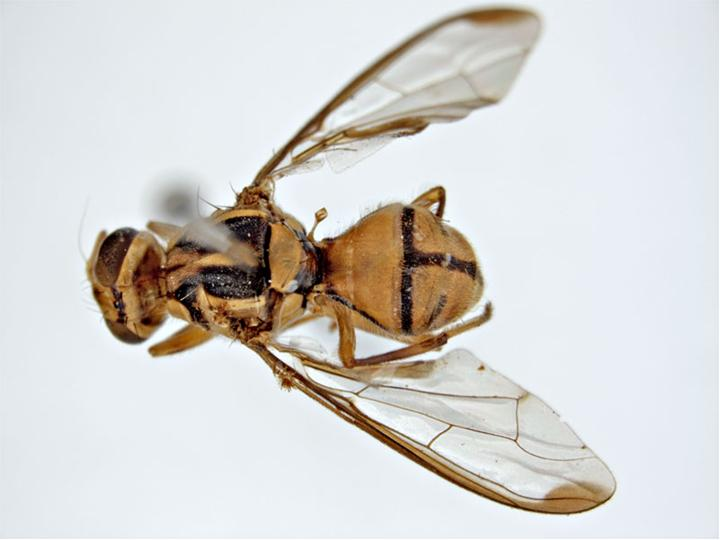
- A mounted specimen

Scientific classification
- Kingdom: Animalia
- Phylum: Arthropoda
- Clade: Pancrustacea
- Class: Insecta
- Order: Diptera
- Family: Tephritidae
- Genus: Zeugodacus
- Species: Z. tau

Binomial name
- Zeugodacus tau Walker, 1849

Synonyms
- Bactrocera tau (Walker); Chaetodacus tau (Walker); Dacus caudatus var. nubilus Hendel; Dacus hageni de Meijere; Dacus nubilus Hendel; Dacus tau (Walker); Dasyneura tau Walker; Zeugodacus nubilus (Hendel)

= Zeugodacus tau =

Species of insect

Zeugodacus tau (syn. Bactrocera tau), the pumpkin fruit fly or the tau fruit fly, is a species of fruit fly in the family Tephritidae. The species is native to tropical and subtropical Asia. It is a major pest species of melons and other cucurbits.

In 2023 the tau fruit fly was found in California. In response, the California Department of Food and Agriculture imposed a quarantine on a portion of Los Angeles County.
