= Carpophthoromyia speciosa =

Scientific classification
- Kingdom: Animalia
- Phylum: Arthropoda
- Class: Insecta
- Order: Diptera
- Family: Tephritidae
- Genus: Carpophthoromyia
- Species: C. speciosa

Binomial name
- Carpophthoromyia speciosa Hancock, 1984

Species of fly

Carpophthoromyia speciosa is a species of tephritid or fruit flies in the genus Carpophthoromyia of the family Tephritidae.
