= Ceratitella inthanona =

Scientific classification
- Kingdom: Animalia
- Phylum: Arthropoda
- Clade: Pancrustacea
- Class: Insecta
- Order: Diptera
- Family: Tephritidae
- Genus: Ceratitella
- Species: C. inthanona

Binomial name
- Ceratitella inthanona Hancock and McGuire, 2002

Species of fly

Ceratitella inthanona is a species of tephritid or fruit flies in the genus Ceratitella of the family Tephritidae.
