= Perilampsis =

Scientific classification
- Kingdom: Animalia
- Phylum: Arthropoda
- Clade: Pancrustacea
- Class: Insecta
- Order: Diptera
- Family: Tephritidae
- Subfamily: Dacinae
- Tribe: Ceratitidini
- Genus: Perilampsis; Bezzi, 1920

Genus of flies

Perilampsis is a genus of tephritid or fruit flies in the family Tephritidae.

== Species ==
The genus includes the following species.

- Perilampsis amazuluana
- Perilampsis atra
- Perilampsis decellei
- Perilampsis diademata
- Perilampsis dryades
- Perilampsis furcata
- Perilampsis miratrix
- Perilampsis pulchella
- Perilampsis umbrina
- Perilampsis woodi
