= Xanthorrachis =

Scientific classification
- Kingdom: Animalia
- Phylum: Arthropoda
- Clade: Pancrustacea
- Class: Insecta
- Order: Diptera
- Family: Tephritidae
- Genus: Xanthorrachis; Bezzi, 1913

Genus of flies

Xanthorrachis is a genus of tephritid or fruit flies in the family Tephritidae.
