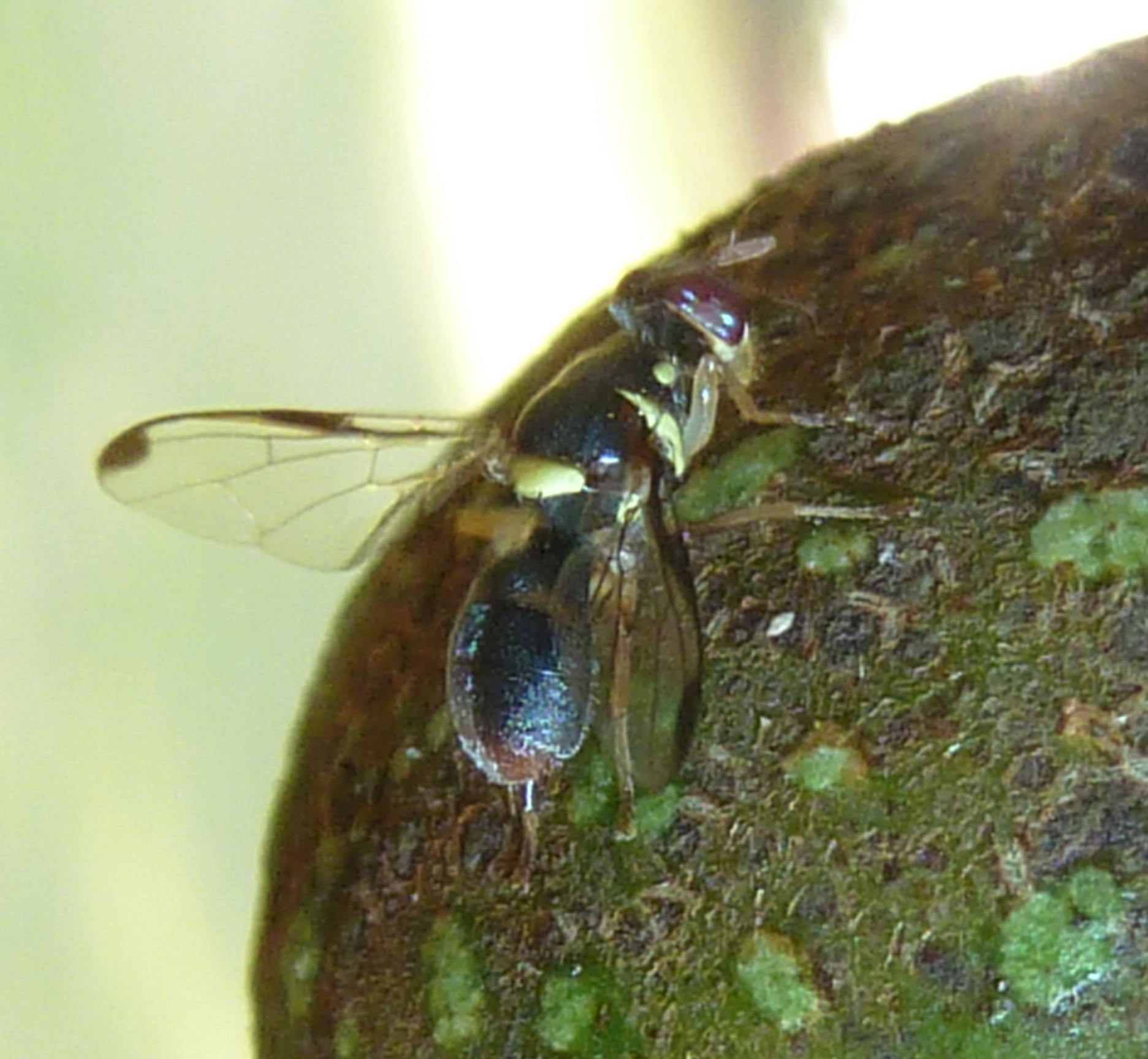
- Dacus ciliatus

Scientific classification
- Domain: Eukaryota
- Kingdom: Animalia
- Phylum: Arthropoda
- Class: Insecta
- Order: Diptera
- Family: Tephritidae
- Subfamily: Dacinae
- Tribe: Dacini
- Genus: Dacus; Fabricius, 1805

Type species
- Dacus armatus Fabricius, 1805

Subgenera
- Callantra; Dacus; Didacus; Leptoxyda; Metidacus

Diversity
- 274 species

Synonyms
- Rhamphodacus Munro, 1984; Tridacus Bezzi, 1915; Neodacus Perkins, 1937; Desmodacus Munro, 1984; Ancylodacus Munro, 1984; Dorylodacus Munro, 1984; Tythocalama Munro, 1984

= Dacus =

Genus of insects

Dacus is a genus of tephritid or fruit flies in the family Tephritidae.

== Systematics ==
Many subgenera are defined within this genus:

- Ambitidacus
- Callantra
- Dacus
- Didacus
- Leptoxyda
- Lophodacus
- Mellesis
- Metidacus
- Neodacus
- Psilodacus

== See also ==
- List of Dacus species
