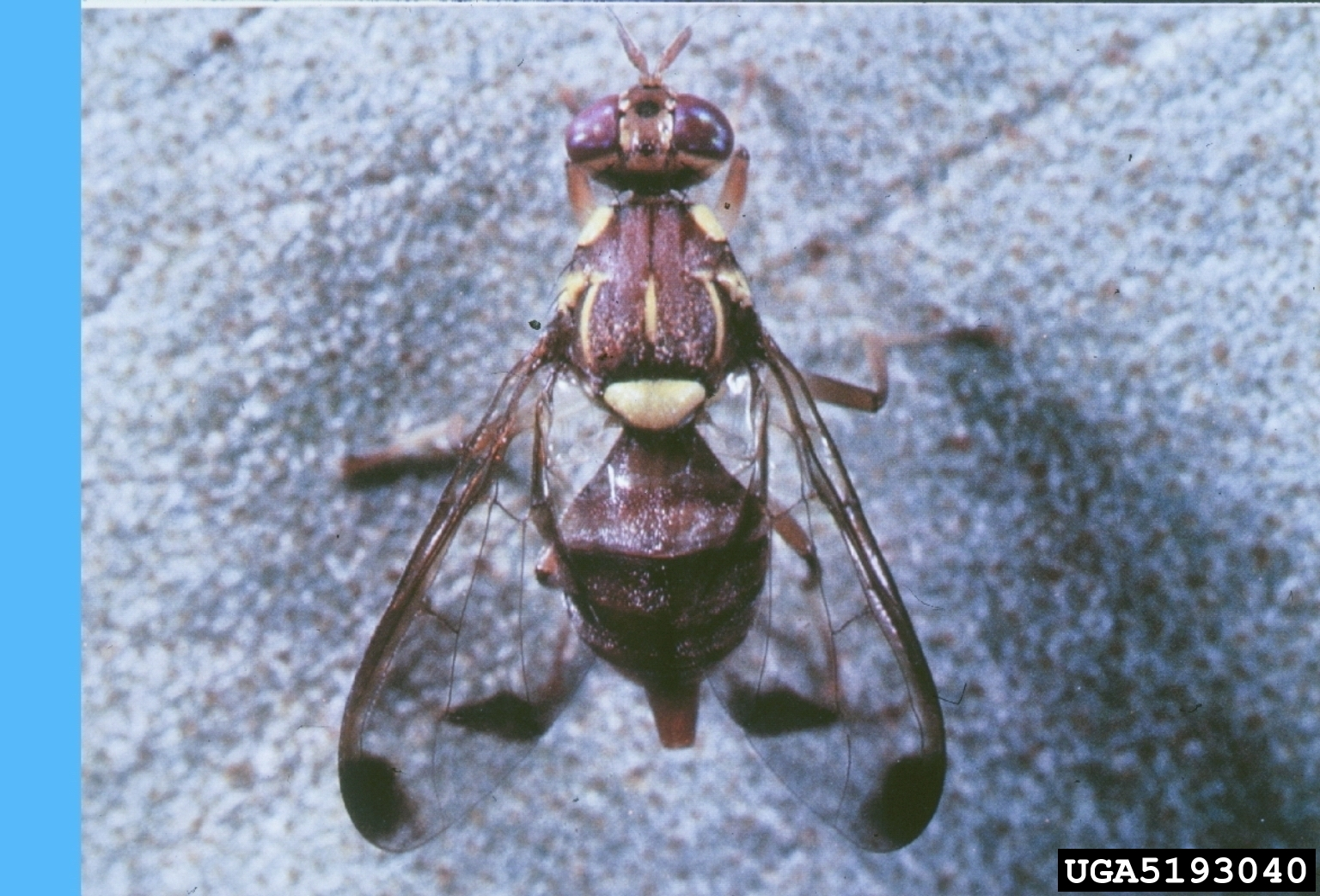

Scientific classification
- Kingdom: Animalia
- Phylum: Arthropoda
- Clade: Pancrustacea
- Class: Insecta
- Order: Diptera
- Family: Tephritidae
- Genus: Zeugodacus
- Species: Z. cucurbitae

Binomial name
- Zeugodacus cucurbitae (Coquillett, 1899)

Synonyms
- Chaetodacus cucurbitae Dacus cucurbitae Strumeta cucurbitae Bactrocera cucurbitae

= Bactrocera cucurbitae =

Species of fly

Zeugodacus cucurbitae, the melon fly, is a fruit fly of the family Tephritidae. It is a serious agricultural pest, particularly in Hawaii.

== Identification ==
=== Adult fly ===
The adult melon fly is 6 to 8 mm in length. Distinctive characteristics include its wing pattern, its long third antennal segment, the reddish yellow dorsum of the thorax with light yellow markings, and the yellowish head with black spots.

=== Egg ===
The egg is elliptical, about 2 mm long, and pure white. It is almost flat on the ventral surface, and more convex on the dorsal. Eggs are often somewhat longitudinally curved.

=== Larva ===
The larva is a cylindrical-maggot shape, elongated, with the anterior end narrowed a somewhat curved ventrally. It has anterior mouth hooks, ventral fusiform areas and a flattened caudal end. Last instar larvae range from 7.5 to 11.8 mm in length.

=== Pupa ===
The puparium ranges in color from dull red or brownish yellow to dull white, and is about 5 to 6 mm in length.

== Life history ==
Development period from egg to adult ranges from 12 to 28 days. The female may lay as many as 1,000 eggs. Eggs are generally laid in young fruit 2-4mm deep, but are also laid in the succulent stems of host plants. The eggs are deposited in cavities created by the female using its sharp ovipositor.

Pupation usually occurs in the soil. There may be as many as 8 to 10 generations a year.

== Behaviour ==
Melon flies are most often found on low, leafy, succulent vegetation near cultivated areas. In hot weather they rest on the undersides of leaves and in shady areas. They are strong fliers and usually fly in the mornings and afternoons. They feed on the juices of decaying fruit, nectar, bird feces, and plant sap.

Mature melon fly males are attracted to several attractants e.g. anisyl acetone, cue-lure, raspberry ketone and zingerone. They are pollinators/visitors of some orchids, especially Bulbophyllum (Orchidaceae) species, that release floral fragrance containing either raspberry ketone or zingerone as floral attractant and reward.

Furthermore, male sex pheromonal components strongly deter predation by lizards.

== Distribution ==
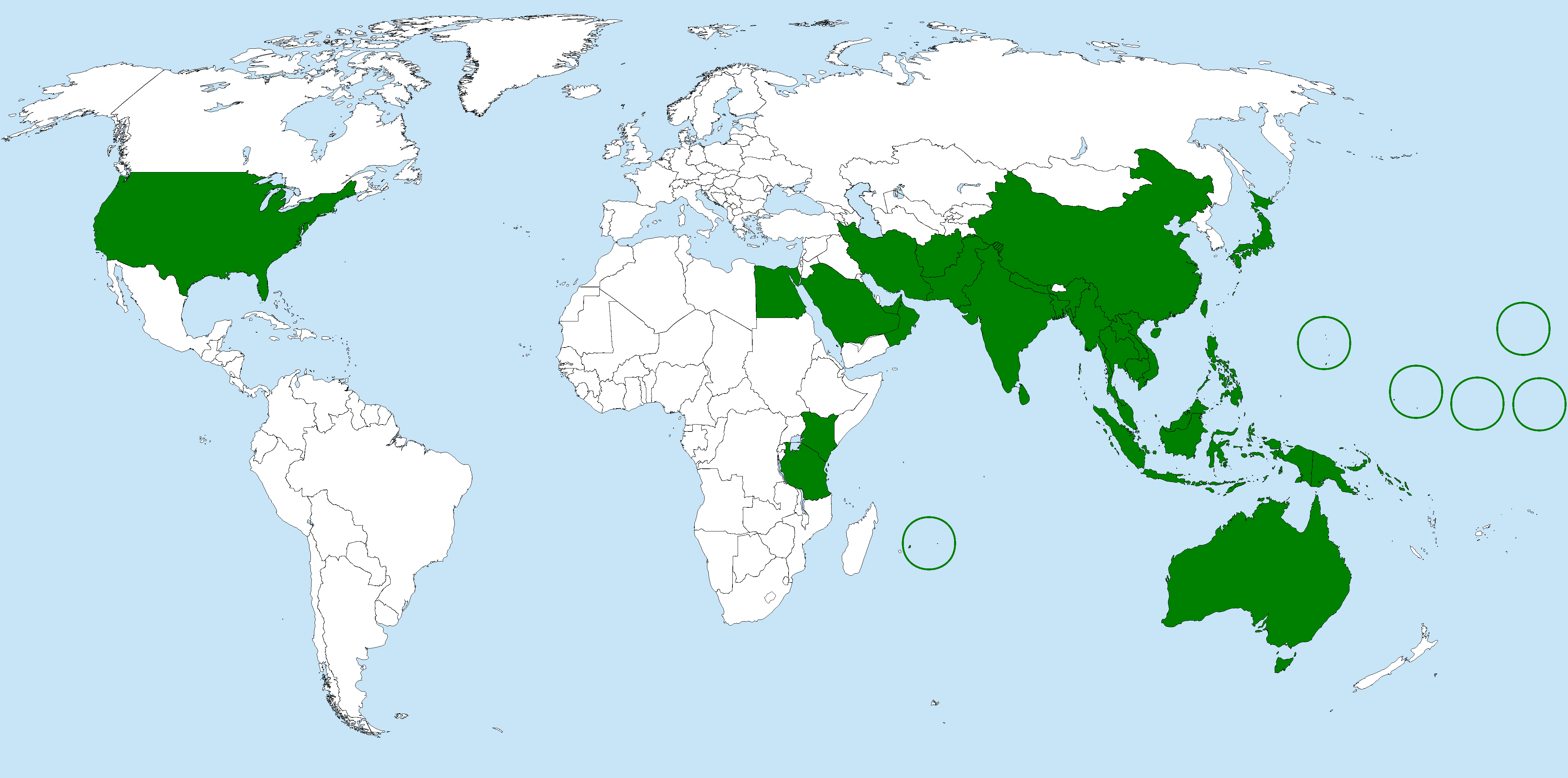
Distribution

The melon fly is native to India, and is distributed throughout most parts of the country. It can be found throughout most of southern Asia, several countries in Africa, some island groups in the Pacific.

In the United States, it was the first tephritid fruit fly species established in Hawaii. It was introduced there from Japan around 1895, and by 1897, when it was first observed, it had already become a serious pest.

Not yet established in the continental United States, it is often intercepted at ports. Occasionally, an infestation is established, but is then eradicated.

== Host plants ==
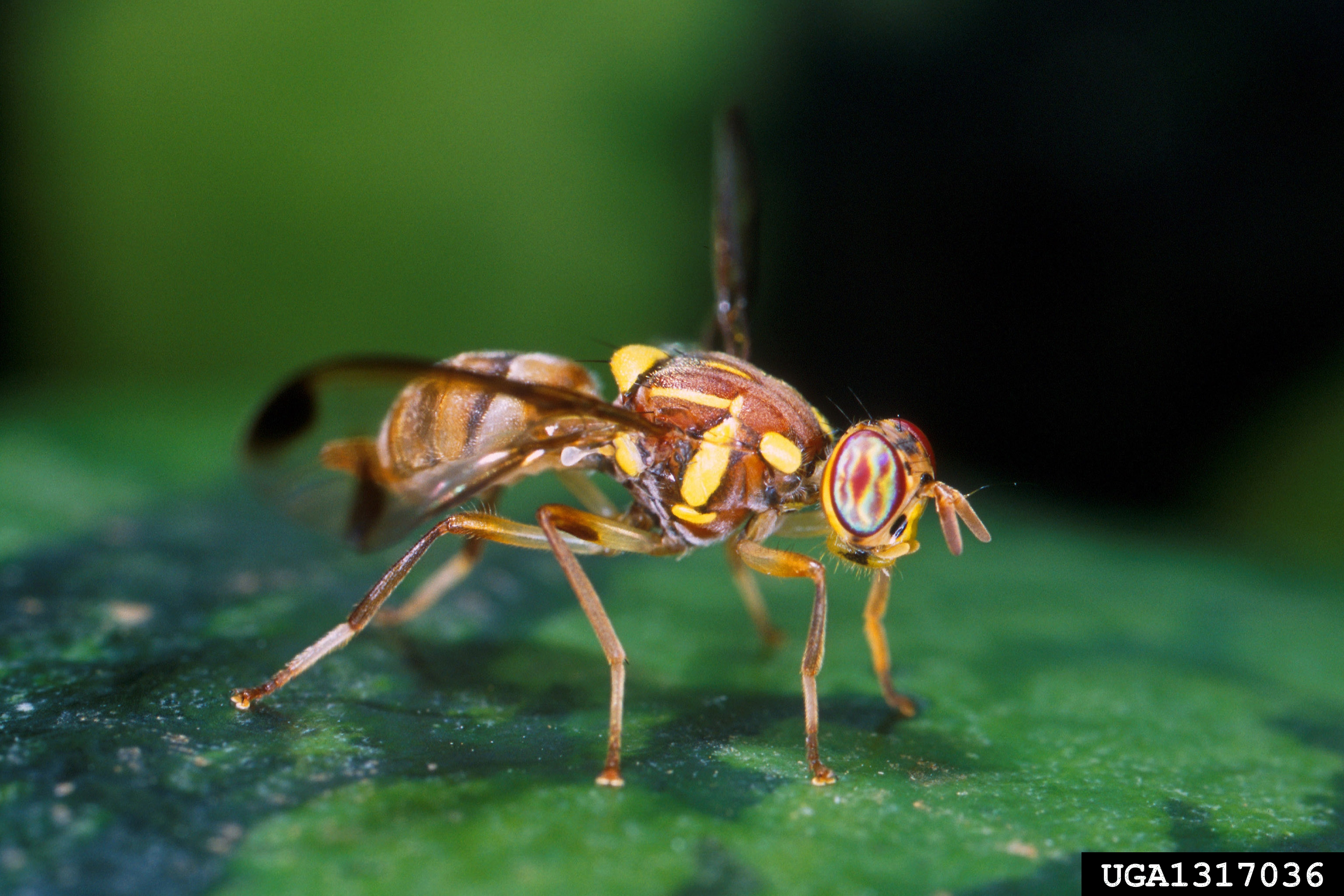
Adult melon fly on a leaf

Melon flies use at least 125 host plants. They are major pests of beans, bittermelon, winter melon, cucumbers, eggplant, green beans, hyotan, luffa, melons, peppers, pumpkins, squashes, Togan, tomatoes, watermelon, and zucchini.

== Damage ==
In the Indomalayan realm, the melon fly is considered the most destructive pest of melons and other related crops. In Hawaii, even prior to fruit set, serious damage to squash and pumpkin crops occur as larvae feed on the crop as it grows.

The melon fly can attack flowers, stem, root tissue, and fruit.

== Management ==
=== Non-chemical control ===
==== Mechanical ====
There are two common mechanical methods of control. One is to use a protective covering to wrap the fruit while it develops. The other is to use baited traps. The former is less cost effective, but is the best way to control them without affecting the environment.

==== Cultural ====
The most effective cultural management technique to destroy the infested fruit that is not marketable, and then to dispose of the crop residues as soon as harvest is complete.

==== Biological control ====
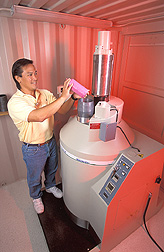
A technician prepares to irradiate male melon fly pupae to sterilize them.

Between 1947 and 1952 in Hawaii, natural enemies of fruit flies were introduced. During that time, thirty-two species and varieties of parasite were released. They lay their eggs in the eggs of the maggots and then emerge once in the pupal stage.

When the braconid parasitoids Fopius arisanus or Pysttalia fletcheri were used, and attacked both melon fly eggs and larvae at the same time, suppression of development was as much as 56%.

Additionally, sterile insect technique has been used in biological control efforts, with success in eradicating the fly from Japan.

=== Chemical control ===
Toxicants in baits applied both to refugia of the fruit flies and sprays applied to crops have been used.

Proteinaceous liquid attractants in insecticide sprays is an effective method of controlling melon fly populations. This bait insecticide is sprayed on broad leaf plants that serve as refugia for melon flies. These baits encourage the adults to feed on the spray residue.
