= Proanoplomus =

Scientific classification
- Domain: Eukaryota
- Kingdom: Animalia
- Phylum: Arthropoda
- Class: Insecta
- Order: Diptera
- Family: Tephritidae
- Subfamily: Dacinae
- Tribe: Gastrozonini
- Genus: Proanoplomus; Shiraki, 1933

Genus of flies

Proanoplomus is a genus of tephritid or fruit flies in the family Tephritidae.

As of 2008, the following fourteen species are recognized:

- Proanoplomus affinis Chen (Zhejiang, China)
- Proanoplomus arcus (Ito) (Honshu, Japan)
- Proanoplomus caudatus (Zia) (Yunnan, China)
- Proanoplomus cinereofasciatus (de Meijere) (Java & Sumatra, Indonesia)
- Proanoplomus cylindricus (Chen) (Taiwan)
- Proanoplomus formosanus Shiraki (Taiwan)
- Proanoplomus intermedius Chen (Fujian, China)
- Proanoplomus japonicus Shiraki (Japan)
- Proanoplomus longimaculatus Hardy (Burma)
- Proanoplomus nigroscutellatus Zia (China & NE India)
- Proanoplomus omeiensis Zia (Sichuan, China)
- Proanoplomus spenceri Hardy (Southern Vietnam)
- Proanoplomus tenompokensis Hancock, 2008 (Sabah, Malaysia)
- Proanoplomus yunnanensis Zia (Yunnan & Guangxi, China; Assam, NE India; Burma; Thailand; Laos; Java, Indonesia)
