= Sinanoplomus =

Scientific classification
- Kingdom: Animalia
- Phylum: Arthropoda
- Class: Insecta
- Order: Diptera
- Family: Tephritidae
- Subfamily: Dacinae
- Genus: Sinanoplomus

Genus of flies

Sinanoplomus is a former genus of tephritid or fruit flies in the family Tephritidae.
