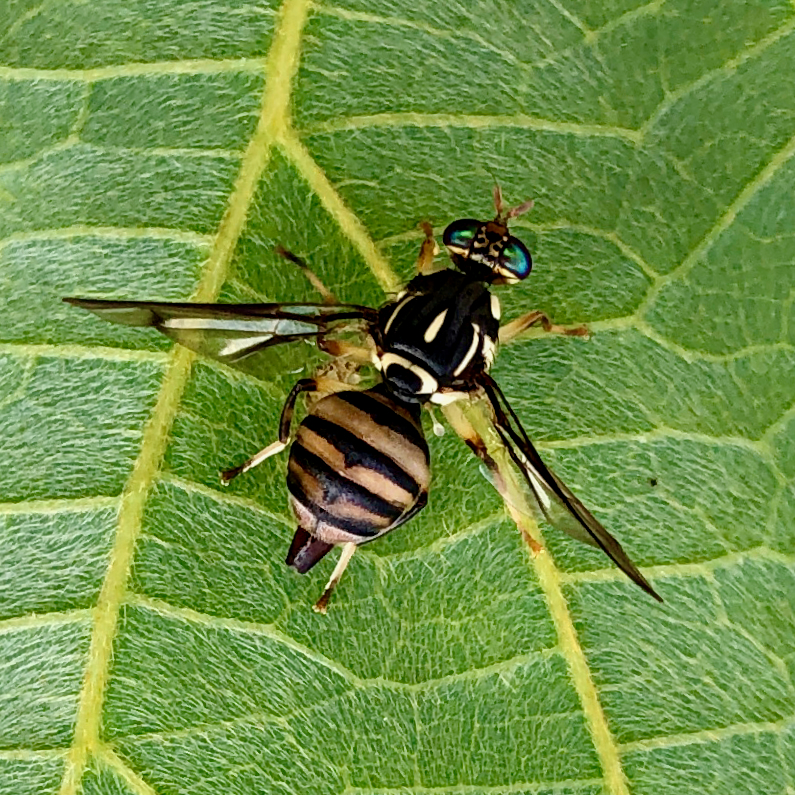
- Zeugodacus scutellatus

Scientific classification
- Domain: Eukaryota
- Kingdom: Animalia
- Phylum: Arthropoda
- Class: Insecta
- Order: Diptera
- Family: Tephritidae
- Subfamily: Dacinae
- Tribe: Dacini
- Genus: Zeugodacus; Hendel, 1927

Type species
- Zeugodacus caudatus Fabricius, 1805

Subgenera
- Asiadacus; Javadacus; Parasinodacus; Zeugodacus

Diversity
- 197 species

= Zeugodacus =

Genus of insects

Zeugodacus is a genus of tephritid or fruit flies in the family Tephritidae.

== Systematics ==
Many subgenera are defined within this genus:

- Asiadacus
- Austrodacus
- Capparidacus
- Diplodacus
- Heminotodacus
- Hemiparatridacus
- Javadacus
- Nesodacus
- Paradacus
- Parasinodacus
- Paratridacus
- Sinodacus
- Zeugodacus

== See also ==
- List of Zeugodacus species
