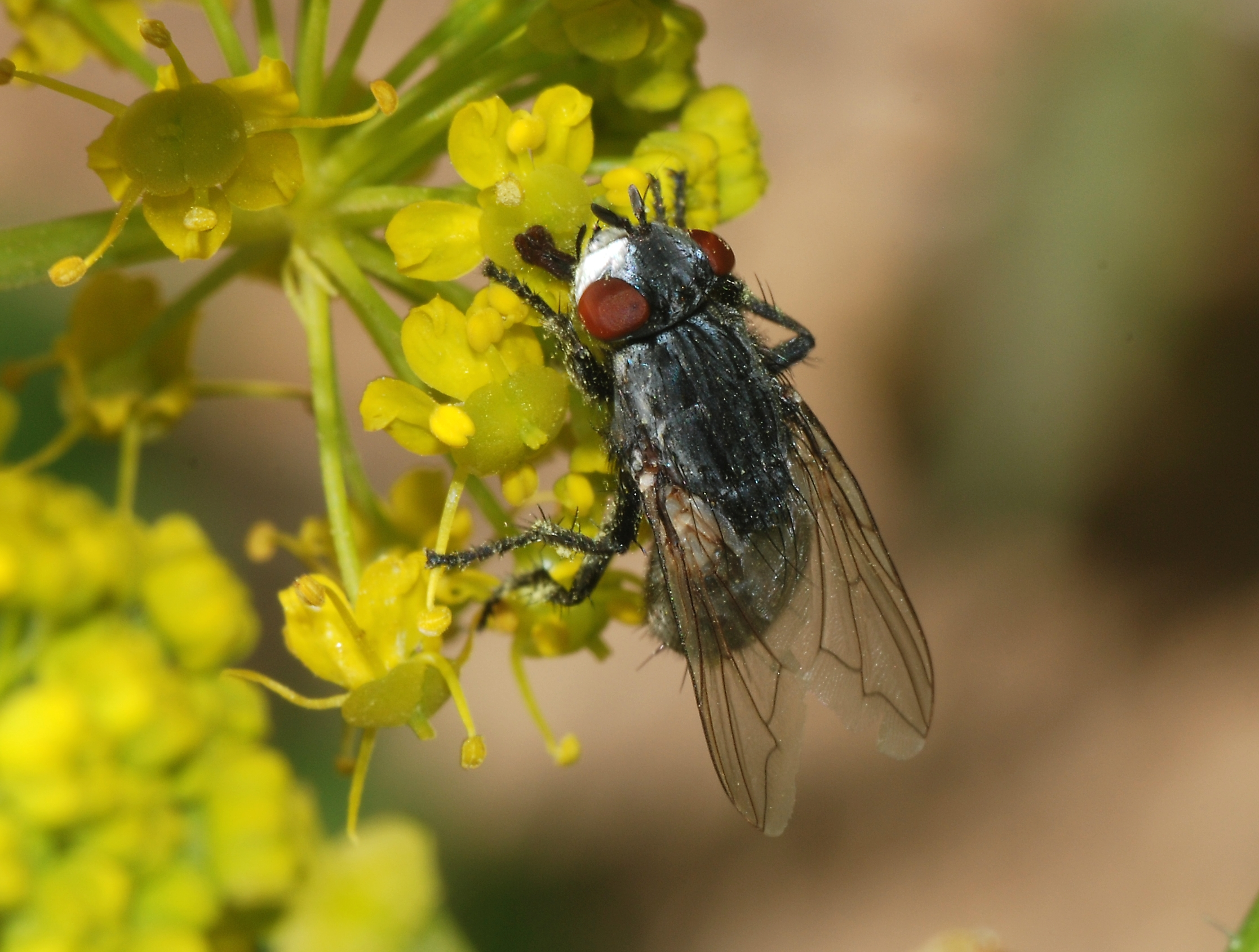
- Wohlfahrtia magnifica

Scientific classification
- Domain: Eukaryota
- Kingdom: Animalia
- Phylum: Arthropoda
- Class: Insecta
- Order: Diptera
- Family: Sarcophagidae
- Subfamily: Paramacronychiinae

= Paramacronychiinae =

Subfamily of flies

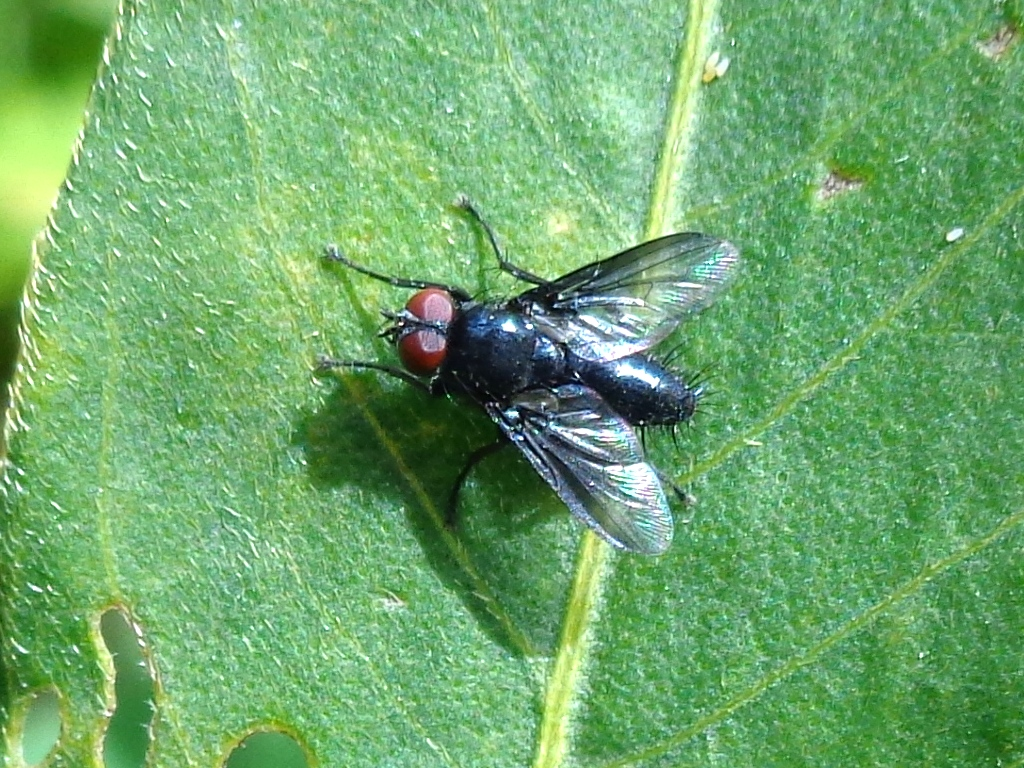
Nyctia halterata

Paramacronychiinae is a subfamily of flesh flies (insects in the family Sarcophagidae).

== Genera ==
These 23 genera belong to the subfamily Paramacronychiinae:

- Agria Robineau-Desvoidy, 1830
- Angiometopa Brauer & von Bergenstamm, 1889
- Asiosarcophila Rohdendorf & Verves, 1978
- Blaesoxiphella Villeneuve, 1912
- Brachicoma Rondani, 1856
- Cattasoma Reinhard, 1947
- Chauliooestrus Villeneuve, 1925
- Dexagria Rohdendorf, 1978
- Erythrandra Brauer & von Bergenstamm, 1891
- Galopagomyia Bischof, 1904
- Goniophyto Townsend, 1927
- Kurahashiodes Verves, 2001
- Mimagria Verves, 2001
- Nyctia Robineau-Desvoidy, 1830
- Oophagomyia Rohdendorf, 1928
- Paramacronychia Brauer & von Bergenstamm, 1889
- Primorya Pape, 1998
- Sarcophila Rondani, 1856
- Sarcotachina Portschinsky, 1881
- Toxonagria Shewell, 1987
- Turanomyia Rohdendorf & Verves, 1979
- Wohlfahrtia Brauer & von Bergenstamm, 1889
- Wohlfahrtiodes Villeneuve, 1910
