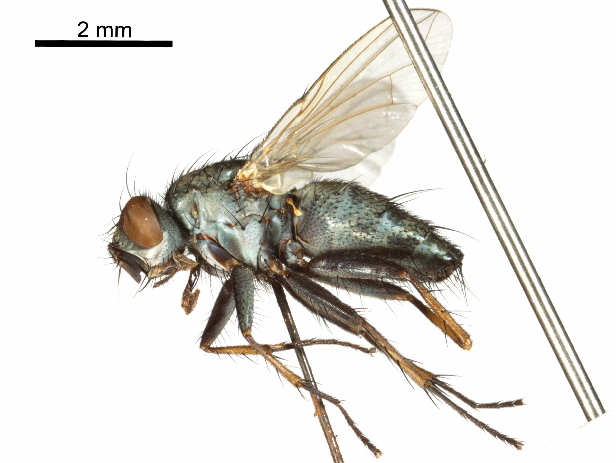
- Goniophyto honshuensis

Scientific classification
- Kingdom: Animalia
- Phylum: Arthropoda
- Class: Insecta
- Order: Diptera
- Family: Sarcophagidae
- Subfamily: Paramacronychiinae
- Genus: Goniophyto; Townsend, 1927

Type species
- Goniophyto formosensis Townsend, 1927

= Goniophyto =

Genus of insects

Goniophyto is a genus of true flies in the family Sarcophagidae.

== Species ==
- G. boninensis Lopes, 1958
- G. bryani Lopes, 1938
- G. formosensis Townsend, 1927
- G. honshuensis Rohdendorf, 1962
- G. horii Kurahashi & Suenaga, 1994
- G. shanghaiensis Deng, Chen & Fan, 2007
- G. tibialis Hennig, 1941
- G. unguicularis Hennig, 1941
- G. yaeyamaensis Kano & Shinonaga, 1964
