= Dexagria =

Scientific classification
- Domain: Eukaryota
- Kingdom: Animalia
- Phylum: Arthropoda
- Class: Insecta
- Order: Diptera
- Family: Sarcophagidae
- Subfamily: Paramacronychiinae
- Genus: Dexagria; Rohdendorf, 1978

Type species
- Dexagria ushinskyi Rohdendorf, 1978

Genus of flies

Dexagria is a genus of true flies in the family Sarcophagidae.

== Species ==
- D. ushinskyi Rohdendorf, 1978
- D. kangdingica Feng & Deng, 2010
