= Oophagomyia plotnikovi =

Scientific classification
- Kingdom: Animalia
- Phylum: Arthropoda
- Class: Insecta
- Order: Diptera
- Family: Sarcophagidae
- Subfamily: Paramacronychiinae
- Genus: Oophagomyia; Rohdendorf, 1928
- Species: O. ussuriensis

Binomial name
- Oophagomyia ussuriensis Rohdendorf, 1928

Synonyms
- Sogdagria syczewskae Tscharykuliev, 1964

Species of fly

Oophagomyia plotnikovi is a species of true flies in the family Sarcophagidae.

== Range ==
China, Kazakhstan, Mongolia, Russia (south of the European part and Western Siberia), Turkmenistan, Uzbekistan.
