= Toxonagria =

Scientific classification
- Domain: Eukaryota
- Kingdom: Animalia
- Phylum: Arthropoda
- Class: Insecta
- Order: Diptera
- Family: Sarcophagidae
- Subfamily: Paramacronychiinae
- Genus: Toxonagria; Shewell, 1987

Type species
- Sarcofahrtia montanensis Parker, 1919

Genus of flies

Toxonagria is a genus of true flies in the family Sarcophagidae.

== Species ==
- T. arnaudi Pape, 1992
- T. montanensis (Parker, 1919)
