= Blaesoxiphella =

Scientific classification
- Kingdom: Animalia
- Phylum: Arthropoda
- Class: Insecta
- Order: Diptera
- Family: Sarcophagidae
- Subfamily: Paramacronychiinae
- Genus: Blaesoxiphella; Villeneuve, 1912
- Species: B. brevicornis

Binomial name
- Blaesoxiphella brevicornis Villeneuve, 1912

Species of fly

Blaesoxiphella brevicornis is a species of true flies in the family Sarcophagidae.

== Range ==
Mongolia.
