= Kurahashiodes =

Scientific classification
- Domain: Eukaryota
- Kingdom: Animalia
- Phylum: Arthropoda
- Class: Insecta
- Order: Diptera
- Family: Sarcophagidae
- Subfamily: Paramacronychiinae
- Genus: Kurahashiodes; Verves, 2001

Type species
- Wohlfahrtodes suenagai Kurahashi, 1994

Genus of insects

Kurahashiodes is a monotypic genus of true flies in the family Sarcophagidae.

== Species ==
- K. suenagai (Kurahashi, 1994)
