= Cattasoma =

Scientific classification
- Domain: Eukaryota
- Kingdom: Animalia
- Phylum: Arthropoda
- Class: Insecta
- Order: Diptera
- Family: Sarcophagidae
- Subfamily: Paramacronychiinae
- Genus: Cattasoma; Reinhard, 1947

Type species
- Cattasoma mediocre Reinhard, 1947

Genus of flies

Cattasoma is a genus of true flies in the family Sarcophagidae.

== Species ==
- C. festinans Reinhard, 1947
- C. mcalpinei Lopes, 1988
- C. mediocre Reinhard, 1947
