= Angiometopa =

Scientific classification
- Domain: Eukaryota
- Kingdom: Animalia
- Phylum: Arthropoda
- Class: Insecta
- Order: Diptera
- Family: Sarcophagidae
- Subfamily: Paramacronychiinae
- Genus: Angiometopa; Brauer & von Bergenstamm, 1889

Type species
- Musca ruralis Fallén, 1810

Synonyms
- Angiometopia Curran, 1927; Homoeocera Bezzi, 1907; Omocera Lioy, 1864; Sarcofahrtia Parker, 1916; Thelodiscus Aldrich, 1916

Genus of flies

Angiometopa is a genus of true flies in the family Sarcophagidae.

== Species ==
- A. bajkalensis Kolomiets & Artamonov, 1981
- A. falleni Pape, 1986
- A. flavisquama Villeneuve, 1911
- A. mihalyii Rohdendorf & Verves, 1978
- A. ravinia Parker, 1916
