= Turanomyia kaszabi =

Scientific classification
- Kingdom: Animalia
- Phylum: Arthropoda
- Class: Insecta
- Order: Diptera
- Family: Sarcophagidae
- Subfamily: Paramacronychiinae
- Genus: Turanomyia; Rohdendorf & Verves, 1979
- Species: T. kaszabi

Binomial name
- Turanomyia kaszabi Rohdendorf & Verves, 1979

Species of fly

Turanomyia kaszabi is a species of true flies in the family Sarcophagidae, the sole species of the genus Turanomyia.

== Range ==
Uzbekistan.
