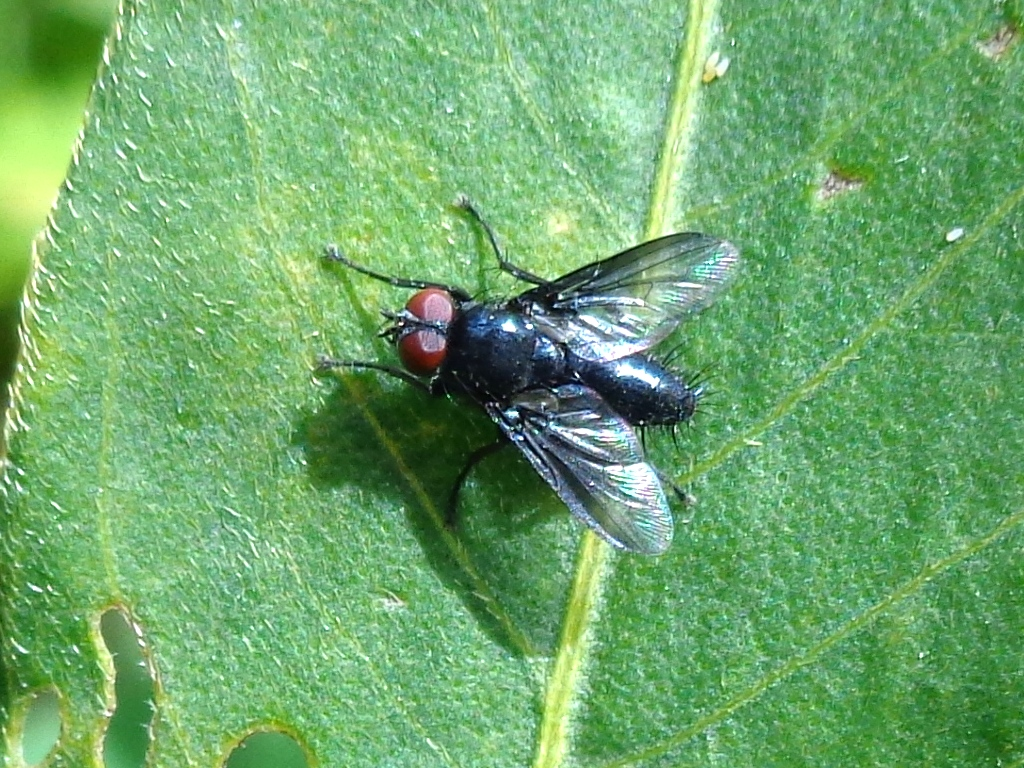
- Nyctia halterata

Scientific classification
- Kingdom: Animalia
- Phylum: Arthropoda
- Clade: Pancrustacea
- Class: Insecta
- Order: Diptera
- Family: Sarcophagidae
- Subfamily: Paramacronychiinae
- Genus: Nyctia; Robineau-Desvoidy, 1830

Type species
- Nyctia carceli Robineau-Desvoidy, 1830

Synonyms
- Megerlea Robineau-Desvoidy, 1830; Anthracia Meigen, 1838; Antracia Rondani, 1862; Nictia Rondani, 1862; Stygina Robineau-Desvoidy, 1863; Calyptia Robineau-Desvoidy, 1863; Cytoria Robineau-Desvoidy, 1863; Macrosoma Lioy, 1864

= Nyctia =

Genus of flies

Nyctia is a genus of true flies in the family Sarcophagidae.

== Species ==
There are four accepted species:

- N. gilbochaeta Lehrer, 2005
- N. halterata (Panzer, 1798)
- N. lagnesia Lehrer, 2005
- N. lunubris (Macquart, 1843)
