= Chauliooestrus =

Scientific classification
- Domain: Eukaryota
- Kingdom: Animalia
- Phylum: Arthropoda
- Class: Insecta
- Order: Diptera
- Family: Sarcophagidae
- Subfamily: Paramacronychiinae
- Genus: Chauliooestrus; Villeneuve, 1925

Type species
- Chauliooestrus capensis Villeneuve, 1925

Synonyms
- Chaulioestrus Neave, 1939; Chaulioestrus Villeneuve, 1925

Genus of flies

Chauliooestrus is a genus of true flies in the family Sarcophagidae.

== Species ==
- C. denudatus (Villeneuve, 1920)
