= Nyctia lunubris =

Scientific classification
- Kingdom: Animalia
- Phylum: Arthropoda
- Class: Insecta
- Order: Diptera
- Family: Sarcophagidae
- Genus: Nyctia
- Species: N. lunubris

Binomial name
- Nyctia lunubris (Macquart, 1843)

Synonyms
- Anthracia lugubris Macquart, 1843

Species of fly

Nyctia lunubris is a species of true flies in the family Sarcophagidae.
