= Erythrandra =

Scientific classification
- Domain: Eukaryota
- Kingdom: Animalia
- Phylum: Arthropoda
- Class: Insecta
- Order: Diptera
- Family: Sarcophagidae
- Subfamily: Paramacronychiinae
- Genus: Erythrandra; Brauer & von Bergenstamm, 1891

Type species
- Erythrandra picipes Brauer & von Bergenstamm, 1891

Synonyms
- Erythandra Shewell, 1987; Eubrachycoma Townsend, 1916; Rabunmyia Dodge, 1956; Sarcoclista Townsend, 1892; Trixoclista Townsend, 1892

Genus of insects

Erythrandra is a genus of true flies in the family Sarcophagidae.

== Species ==
- E. picipes Brauer & von Bergenstamm, 1891
- E. distincta (Townsend, 1892)
