= Galopagomyia =

Scientific classification
- Domain: Eukaryota
- Kingdom: Animalia
- Phylum: Arthropoda
- Class: Insecta
- Order: Diptera
- Family: Sarcophagidae
- Subfamily: Paramacronychiinae
- Genus: Galopagomyia; Bischof, 1904

Type species
- Microcerella steindachneri Brauer & von Bergenstamm, 1891

Synonyms
- Galapagomyia Lopes, 1969; Galapomyia Lopes, 1975; Galpagomyia Bischof, 1904; Microcerella Brauer & von Bergenstamm, 1891; Panamaphyto Townsend, 1931

Genus of insects

Galopagomyia is a genus of true flies in the family Sarcophagidae.

== Species ==
- G. inoa Walker, 1849
