= Mimagria =

Scientific classification
- Kingdom: Animalia
- Phylum: Arthropoda
- Clade: Pancrustacea
- Class: Insecta
- Order: Diptera
- Family: Sarcophagidae
- Subfamily: Paramacronychiinae
- Genus: Mimagria; Verves, 2001

Type species
- Agria xiangchengensis Chao & Zhang, 1988

Genus of insects

Mimagria is a genus of true flies in the family Sarcophagidae.

== Species ==
- M. xiangchengensis (Chao & Zhang, 1988)
