= Paramacronychia =

Scientific classification
- Domain: Eukaryota
- Kingdom: Animalia
- Phylum: Arthropoda
- Class: Insecta
- Order: Diptera
- Family: Sarcophagidae
- Subfamily: Paramacronychiinae
- Genus: Paramacronychia; Brauer & von Bergenstamm, 1889

Type species
- Macronychia flavipalpis Girschner, 1881

Genus of flies

Paramacronychia is a genus of true flies in the family Sarcophagidae.

== Species ==
- P. flavipalpis Girschner, 1881
