= Asiosarcophila =

Scientific classification
- Kingdom: Animalia
- Phylum: Arthropoda
- Class: Insecta
- Order: Diptera
- Family: Sarcophagidae
- Subfamily: Paramacronychiinae
- Genus: Asiosarcophila; Rohdendorf & Verves, 1978
- Species: A. kaszabi

Binomial name
- Asiosarcophila kaszabi Rohdendorf & Verves, 1978

Species of fly

Asiosarcophila kaszabi is a species of true flies in the family Sarcophagidae.

== Range ==
Mongolia.
