= Wohlfahrtia seguyi =

Scientific classification
- Kingdom: Animalia
- Phylum: Arthropoda
- Class: Insecta
- Order: Diptera
- Family: Sarcophagidae
- Genus: Wohlfahrtia
- Species: W. seguyi

Binomial name
- Wohlfahrtia seguyi Salem, 1938

Species of fly

Wohlfahrtia seguyi is a species of flesh fly in the family Sarcophagidae.

== Range ==
Mauritania.
