= Dexagria ushinskyi =

Scientific classification
- Kingdom: Animalia
- Phylum: Arthropoda
- Class: Insecta
- Order: Diptera
- Family: Sarcophagidae
- Genus: Dexagria
- Species: D. ushinskyi

Binomial name
- Dexagria ushinskyi Rohdendorf, 1978

Species of fly

Dexagria ushinskyi is a species of true flies in the family Sarcophagidae.

== Range ==
Turkmenistan.
