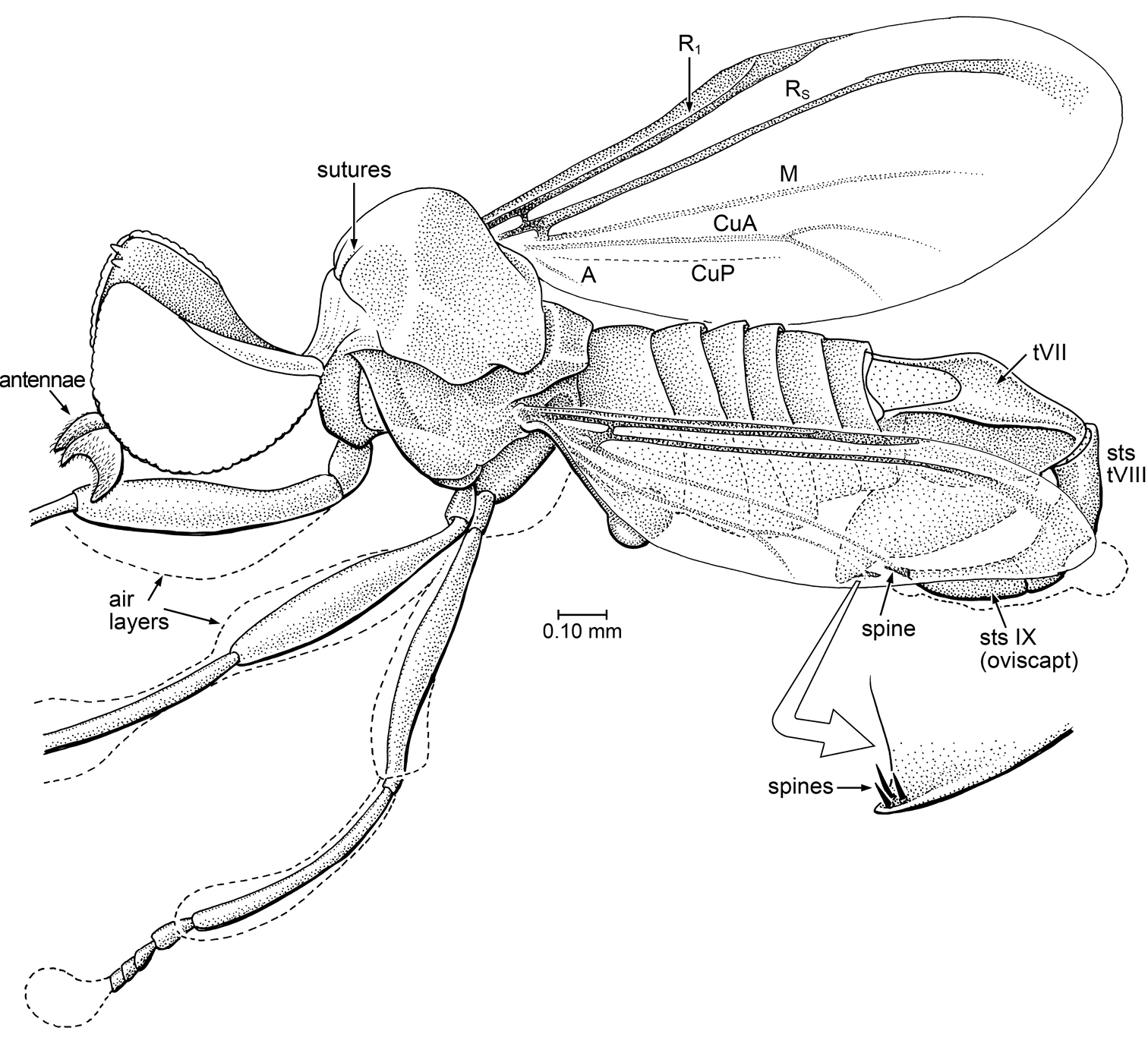
- Tethepomyia zigrasi

Scientific classification
- Kingdom: Animalia
- Phylum: Arthropoda
- Clade: Pancrustacea
- Class: Insecta
- Order: Diptera
- Superfamily: †Archisargoidea
- Family: †Tethepomyiidae; Grimaldi and Arillo 2008

Genera
- Tethepomima; Tethepomyia

= Tethepomyiidae =

Tethepomyiidae Temporal range: Albian–Turonian

Extinct family of flies

Tethepomyiidae is an extinct family of small brachyceran flies known from the Cretaceous period of Laurasia. It is part of the extinct superfamily Archisargoidea. The family is characterised by "very large eyes, reduced mouthparts, a highly reduced antennal flagellum, and greatly reduced venation." The ovipositor of Tethepomyia zigrasi has a hypodermic morphology likely used for injecting eggs into hosts.

== Taxonomy ==
- †Tethepomima Grimaldi and Arillo 2008
  - †Tethepomima holomma Grimaldi and Arillo 2008 Álava amber (Spanish amber), Escucha Formation, Spain, Albian
- †Tethepomyia Grimaldi and Cumming 1999
  - †Tethepomyia buruhandi Grimaldi and Arillo 2008 Álava amber, Escucha Formation, Spain, Albian
  - †Tethepomyia coxa Grimaldi 2016 Burmese amber, Myanmar, Cenomanian
  - †Tethepomyia thauma Grimaldi and Cumming 1999 New Jersey amber, Turonian
  - †Tethepomyia zigrasi Grimaldi and Arillo 2011 Burmese amber, Myanmar, Cenomanian
