= Tricharaea brevicornis =

Scientific classification
- Kingdom: Animalia
- Phylum: Arthropoda
- Class: Insecta
- Order: Diptera
- Family: Sarcophagidae
- Genus: Tricharaea
- Species: T. brevicornis

Binomial name
- Tricharaea brevicornis Wiedemann, 1830

Species of fly

Tricharaea brevicornis is a species of flesh fly. It is found in neotropical regions of Australia, and has been introduced into New Zealand.

== Habitat ==
It is found in open pastures, open woodlands and along beaches in south-eastern Australia and New Zealand.
