= Wohlfahrtia pachytyli =

Scientific classification
- Kingdom: Animalia
- Phylum: Arthropoda
- Clade: Pancrustacea
- Class: Insecta
- Order: Diptera
- Family: Sarcophagidae
- Genus: Wohlfahrtia
- Species: W. pachytyli

Binomial name
- Wohlfahrtia pachytyli (Townsend, 1919)

Synonyms
- Afrowohlfahrtia pachytyli Townsend, 1919; Cynomyia pictifacies Villeneuve, 1920; Wohlfahrtia curtata Townsend, 1931; Wohlfahrtia euvittata Villeneuve, 1920

Species of fly

Wohlfahrtia pachytyli is a species of flesh fly in the family Sarcophagidae. This fly is a parasite of the brown locust, Locustana pardalina; the fly deposits larvae on late-instar hoppers and adult fledglings, generally targeting them as they shed old skin (ecdysis).

== Range ==
South Africa, Angola & Namibia.
