= Wohlfahrtia villeneuvi =

Scientific classification
- Kingdom: Animalia
- Phylum: Arthropoda
- Class: Insecta
- Order: Diptera
- Family: Sarcophagidae
- Genus: Wohlfahrtia
- Species: W. villeneuvi

Binomial name
- Wohlfahrtia villeneuvi Salem, 1938

Synonyms
- Wohlfahrtia musiva Séguy, 1953

Species of fly

Wohlfahrtia villeneuvi is a species of flesh fly in the family Sarcophagidae.

== Range ==
Egypt, Iran, Libya, Turkmenistan, Chad, Mauritania.
