= Acrocephalomyia pulchra =

Scientific classification
- Kingdom: Animalia
- Phylum: Arthropoda
- Class: Insecta
- Order: Diptera
- Family: Ropalomeridae
- Genus: Acrocephalomyia
- Species: A. pulchra

Binomial name
- Acrocephalomyia pulchra Alvim & Ale-Rocha, 2016

Species of fly from Brazil

Acrocephalomyia pulchra is a species of fly in the genus Acrocephalomyia of the family Ropalomeridae.

== Range ==
Acrocephalomyia pulchra is only known from the type locality on the Urucu River in the Amazonas region of Brazil.
