= Kovalevisargidae =

Kovalevisargidae Temporal range: Callovian–Oxfordian

Scientific classification
- Kingdom: Animalia
- Phylum: Arthropoda
- Clade: Pancrustacea
- Class: Insecta
- Order: Diptera
- Superfamily: †Archisargoidea
- Family: †Kovalevisargidae; Mostovski, 1997

Genera
- Kerosargus; Kovalevisargus

Extinct family of flies

The Brachyceran family Kovalevisargidae is an extinct group of flies known from the Jurassic Daohugou biota of China and the Karabastau Formation of Kazakhstan.

== Taxonomy ==
- †Kerosargus Mostovski 1997
  - †Kerosargus argus Mostovski 1997 Karabastau Formation, Kazakhstan, Oxfordian
  - †Kerosargus sororius Zhang 2011 Daohugou, China, Callovian
- †Kovalevisargus Mostovski 1997
  - †Kovalevisargus brachypterus Zhang 2011 Daohugou, China, Callovian
  - †Kovalevisargus clarigenus Mostovski 1997 Karabastau Formation, Kazakhstan, Oxfordian
  - †Kovalevisargus haifanggouensis Zhang 2014 Haifanggou Formation, China, Callovian/Oxfordian
  - †Kovalevisargus macropterus Zhang 2011 Daohugou, China, Callovian
