= Primorya ussuriensis =

Scientific classification
- Kingdom: Animalia
- Phylum: Arthropoda
- Class: Insecta
- Order: Diptera
- Family: Sarcophagidae
- Genus: Primorya; Pape, 1998
- Species: P. ussuriensis

Binomial name
- Primorya ussuriensis Pape, 1998

Species of fly

Primorya ussuriensis is a species of true flies in the family Sarcophagidae.

== Range ==
Primorsky Krai, Russia.
