= Sarcophila =

Scientific classification
- Kingdom: Animalia
- Phylum: Arthropoda
- Clade: Pancrustacea
- Class: Insecta
- Order: Diptera
- Family: Sarcophagidae
- Subfamily: Paramacronychiinae
- Genus: Sarcophila; Rondani, 1856

Type species
- Musca latifrons Fallén, 1817

Synonyms
- Asiosarcophila Rohdendorf & Verves, 1978; Crypsosarcophila Kano & Lopes, 1969; Cryptosarcophila Townsend, 1931; Sarcophilla Vimmer & Soukup, 1940

Genus of flies

Sarcophila is a genus of true flies in the family Sarcophagidae.

== Species ==
- S. botnariuci Lehrer & Oprisan, 2011
- S. canaanita Lehrer, 2007
- S. dayanella Lehrer, 2003
- S. japonica (Rohdendorf, 1962)
- S. latifrons (Fallén, 1817)
- S. meridionalis Rohdendorf & Verves, 1985
- S. meridionalis Verves, 1982
- S. mongolica Chao & Zhang, 1988
- S. monteora Lehrer & Oprisan, 2011
- S. nawara Lehrer, 2003
- S. olsufjevi Verves, 1982
- S. rasnitzyni Verves, 1982
- S. turanica Verves, 1982
