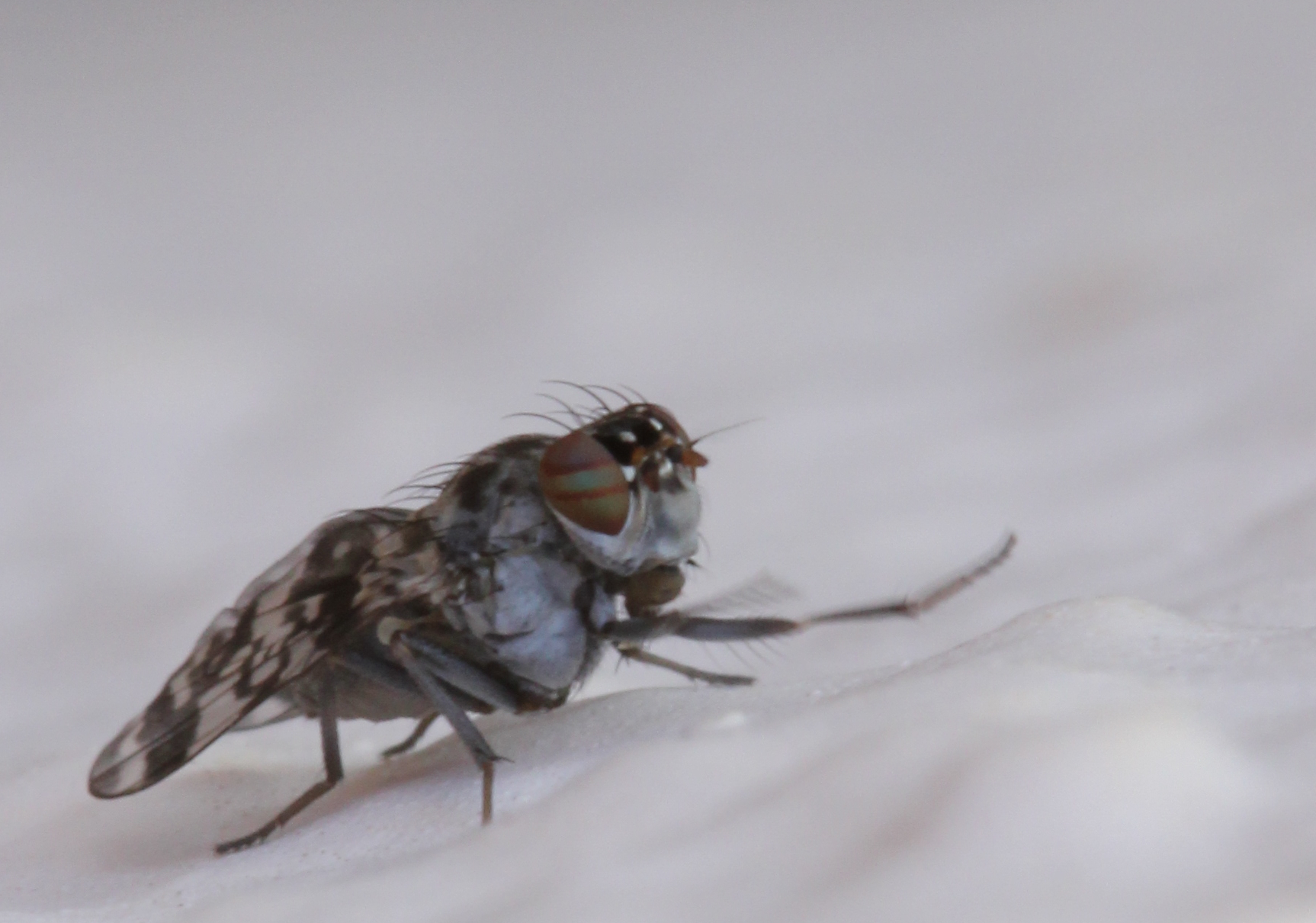
- Unidentified Cestrotus species

Scientific classification
- Domain: Eukaryota
- Kingdom: Animalia
- Phylum: Arthropoda
- Class: Insecta
- Order: Diptera
- Family: Lauxaniidae
- Subfamily: Homoneurinae
- Genus: Cestrotus; Loew, 1862

Type species
- Cestrotus turritus Loew, 1862

Synonyms
- Turriger Kertész, 1904

= Cestrotus =

Genus of flies

Cestrotus is a genus of brachyceran flies in the family Lauxaniidae.

== Species ==
- C. acuticurvus Li, Yang and Gaimari, 2009
- C. apicalis (Hendel, 1920)
- C. argenteus Hendel, 1920
- C. cutherbertsoni Curran, 1938
- C. elegans Hendel, 1920
- C. flavipes (Frey, 1927)
- C. flavoscutellatus de Meijere, 1910
- C. frontalis (Kertész, 1904)
- C. hennigi (Lindner, 1956)
- C. heteropterus Li, Yang and Gaimari, 2009
- C. liui Li, Yang and Gaimari, 2009
- C. longinudus Li, Yang and Gaimari, 2009
- C. megacephalus Loew, 1862
- C. obtusus Li, Yang and Gaimari, 2009
- C. oculatus Hendel, 1910
- C. pictipennis (Wiedemann, 1824)
- C. pilosus (Hendel, 1920)
- C. polygrammus (Walker, 1861)
- C. striatus Hendel, 1910
- C. tibialis Bezzi, 1908
- C. trivittatus Sasakawa, 2003
- C. turritus Loew, 1862
- C. univittatus Sasakawa, 2003
- C. variegatus Loew, 1862
