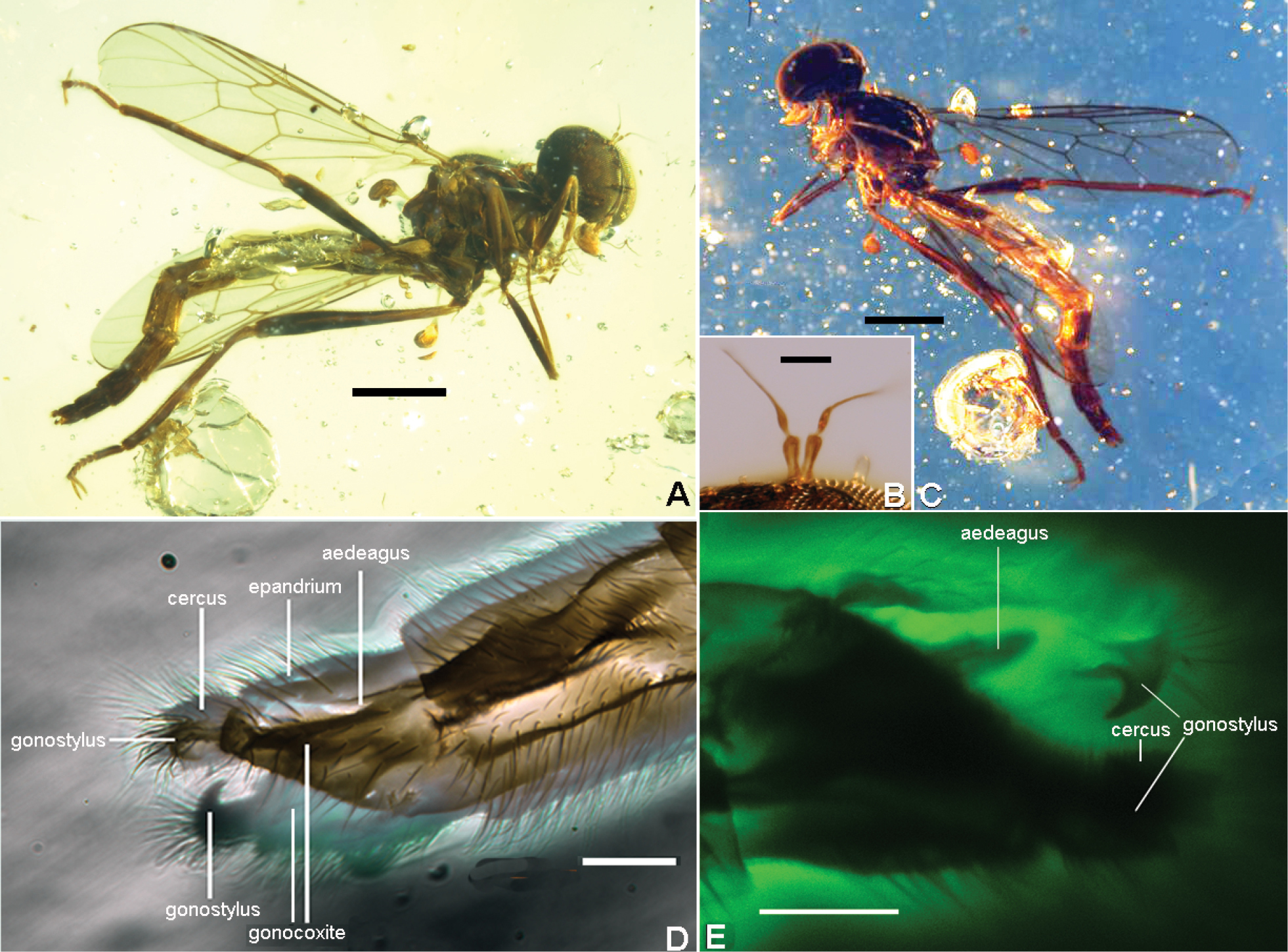
- Zhenia xiai

Scientific classification
- Domain: Eukaryota
- Kingdom: Animalia
- Phylum: Arthropoda
- Class: Insecta
- Order: Diptera
- Superfamily: †Archisargoidea
- Family: †Eremochaetidae; Ussatchov 1968

Genera
- See text

= Eremochaetidae =

Eremochaetidae Temporal range: Oxfordian–Cenomanian

Extinct family of flies

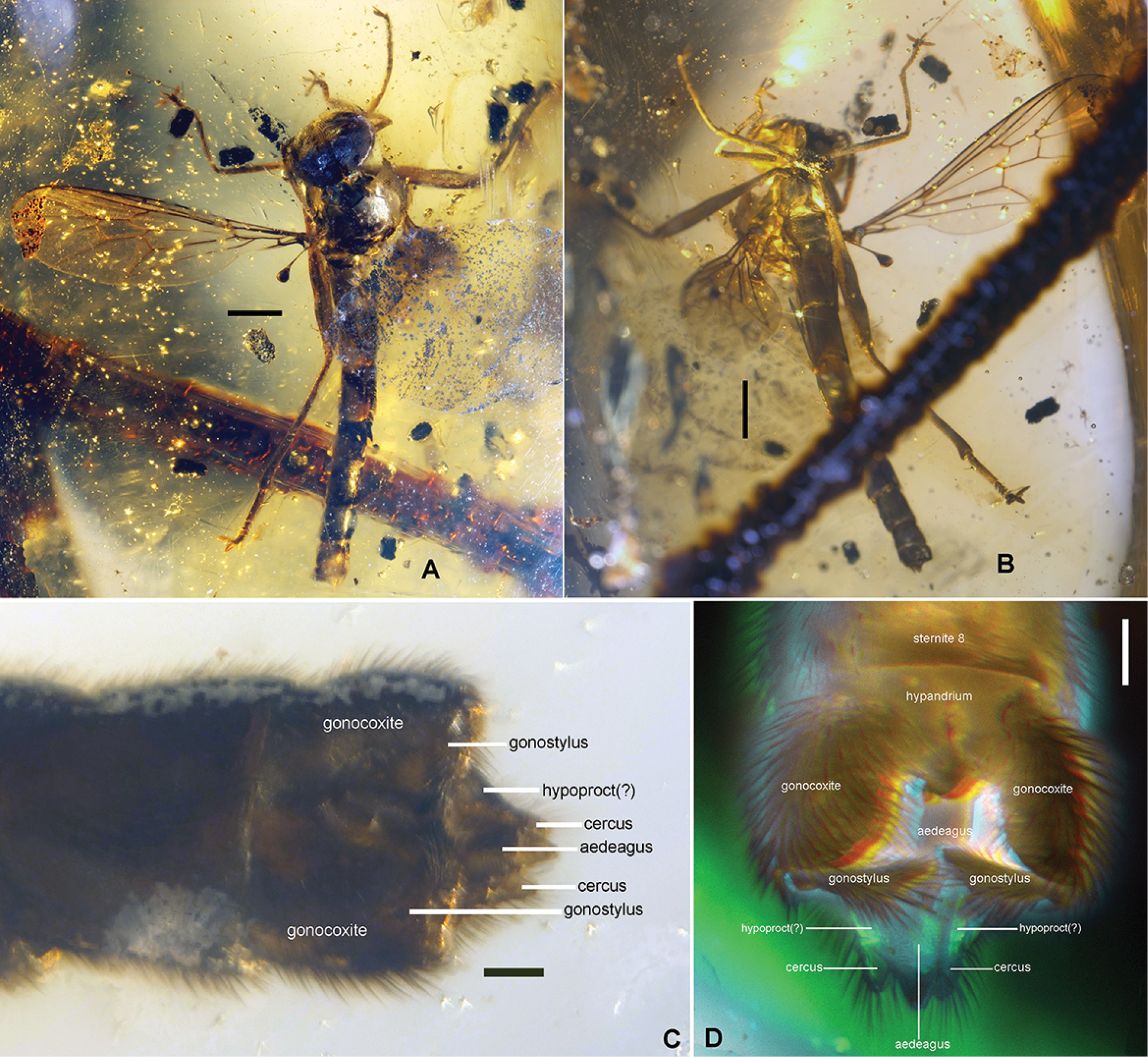
Zhenia burmensis

Eremochaetidae is an extinct family of brachyceran flies known from the Jurassic and Cretaceous periods of Asia. It is part of the extinct superfamily Archisargoidea. The morphology of the ovipositor of the only 3 dimensionally preserved genus Zhenia was initially interpreted as evidence of being an endoparasitoid of arthropods, however a subsequent study suggested that the ovipositor was used to deposit its eggs in plant material, similar to members of Tephritoidea. In a phylogenetic analysis, Ermochaetidae was found to be monophyletic, surrounded by a paraphyletic Archisargidae.

== Taxonomy ==
- †Alleremonomus Ren and Guo 1995
  - †Alleremonomus xingi Ren and Guo 1995 Laiyang Formation, Yixian Formation, China, Aptian
- †Dissup Evenhuis 1994
  - †Dissup clausus Zhang et al. 2014 Yixian Formation, China, Aptian
  - †Dissup irae (Kovalev 1989) Turga Formation, Russia, Aptian
- †Eremochaetomima Mostovski 1996
  - †Eremochaetomima incompleta Mostovski 1996 Karabastau Formation, Kazakhstan, Oxfordian
- †Eremochaetosoma Kovalev 1986
  - †Eremochaetosoma mongolicum Kovalev 1986 Gurvan-Eren Formation, Mongolia, Aptian
- †Eremochaetus Ussatchov 1968
  - †Eremochaetus asilicus Ussatchov 1968 Karabastau Formation, Kazakhstan, Oxfordian
- †Eremomukha Mostovski 1996
  - †Eremomukha (Eremocreta) Mostovski 1996
    - †Eremomukha (Eremocreta) addita Mostovski 1996 Zaza Formation, Russia, Aptian
    - †Eremomukha (Eremocreta) posita Mostovski 1996 Zaza Formation, Russia, Aptian
    - †Eremomukha (Eremocreta) sorosi Mostovski 1996 Zaza Formation, Russia, Aptian
  - †Eremomukha (Eremomukha) Mostovski 1996
    - †Eremomukha (Eremomukha) angusta Zhang 2014 Yixian Formation, China, Aptian
    - †Eremomukha (Eremomukha) insidiosa Mostovski 1996 Gurvan-Eren Formation, Mongolia, Aptian
    - †Eremomukha (Eremomukha) tenuissima Zhang 2014 Yixian Formation, China, Aptian
    - †Eremomukha (Eremomukha) tsokotukha Mostovski 1996 Dzun-Bain Formation, Mongolia, Aptian
- †Lepteremochaetus Ren 1998 Yixian Formation, China, Aptian
  - †Lepteremochaetus elegans Zhang 2014
  - †Lepteremochaetus lithoecius Ren 1998
- †Pareremochaetus Ussatchov 1968
  - †Pareremochaetus minor Ussatchov 1968 Karabastau Formation, Kazakhstan, Oxfordian
- †Zhenia Zhang et al. 2016 Burmese amber, Myanmar, Cenomanian
  - †Zhenia xiai Zhang et al. 2016
  - †Zhenia burmensis Zhang & Zhang, 2019
