= Agria (fly) =

Scientific classification
- Domain: Eukaryota
- Kingdom: Animalia
- Phylum: Arthropoda
- Class: Insecta
- Order: Diptera
- Family: Sarcophagidae
- Subfamily: Paramacronychiinae
- Genus: Agria; Robineau-Desvoidy, 1830

Type species
- Agria punctata Robineau-Desvoidy, 1830

Synonyms
- Eupseudosarcophaga Townsend, 1932; Pseudosarcophaga Kramer, 1908

Genus of flies

Agria is a genus of true flies in the family Sarcophagidae.

== Species ==
- A. affinis (Fallén, 1817)
- A. cicadina (Kato, 1943)
- A. hikosana (Kurahashi, 1975)
- A. housei Shewell, 1971
- A. mamillata Pandellé, 1896
- A. monachae (Kramer, 1908)
- A. shinonagai (Kurahashi, 1975)
- A. xiangchengensis Chao & Zhang, 1988
