= Acrocephalomyia zumbadoi =

Scientific classification
- Domain: Eukaryota
- Kingdom: Animalia
- Phylum: Arthropoda
- Class: Insecta
- Order: Diptera
- Family: Ropalomeridae
- Genus: Acrocephalomyia
- Species: A. zumbadoi

Binomial name
- Acrocephalomyia zumbadoi Ibáñez–Bernal & Hernández–Ortiz, 2012

Species of fly from Brazil

Acrocephalomyia zumbadoi is a species of fly in the genus Acrocephalomyia of the family Ropalomeridae.

== Range ==
Acrocephalomyia zumbadoi has been found in Costa Rica throughout the provinces of Guanacaste and Heredia.
