= Raimondia =

Scientific classification
- Domain: Eukaryota
- Kingdom: Animalia
- Phylum: Arthropoda
- Class: Insecta
- Order: Diptera
- Family: Sarcophagidae
- Genus: Raimondia; Townsend, 1917

Genus of flies

Raimondia is a genus of flies belonging to the family Sarcophagidae.

Species:

- Raimondia uruhuasi Townsend, 1917
