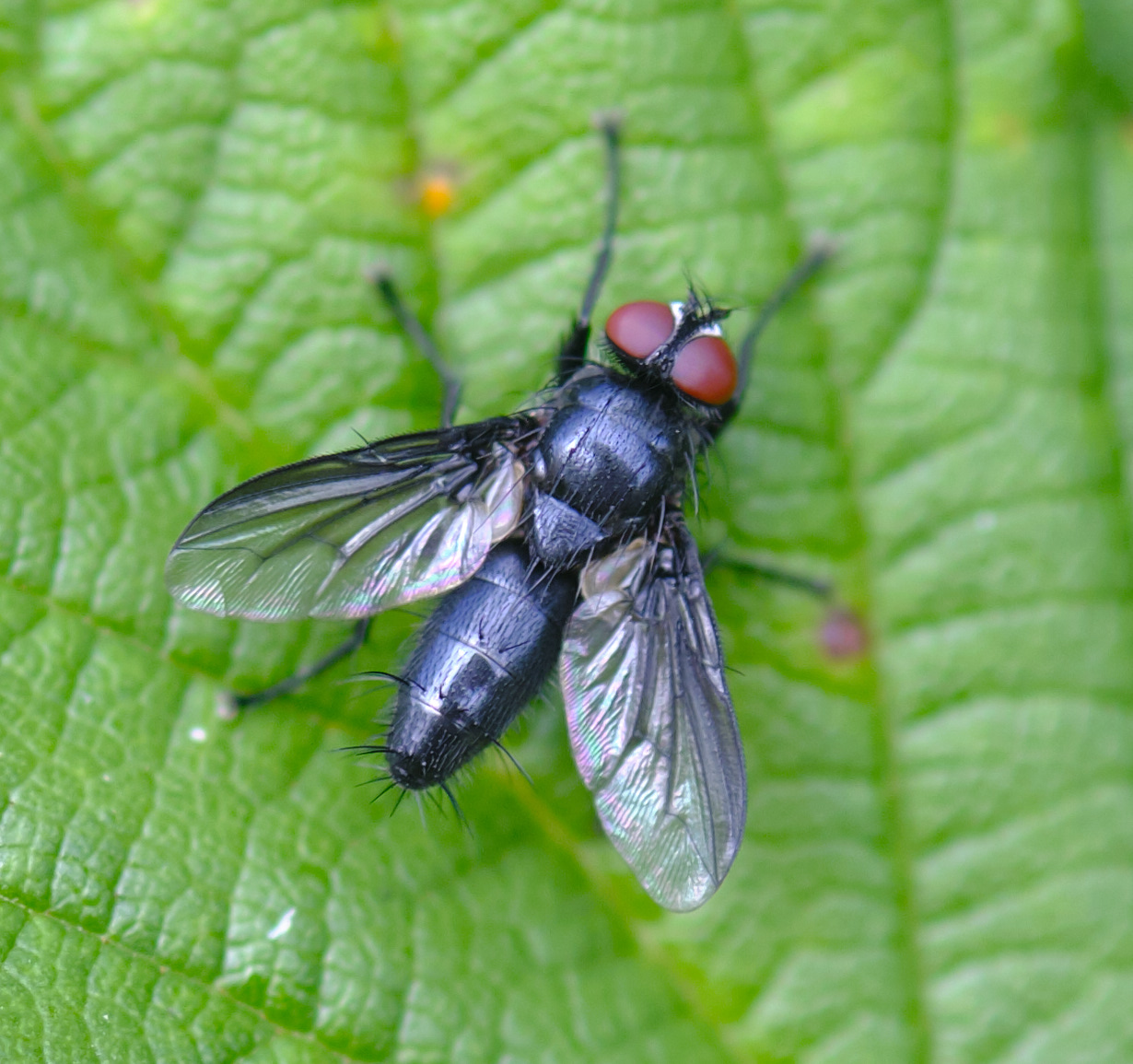

Scientific classification
- Kingdom: Animalia
- Phylum: Arthropoda
- Class: Insecta
- Order: Diptera
- Family: Sarcophagidae
- Genus: Nyctia
- Species: N. halterata

Binomial name
- Nyctia halterata (Panzer, 1798)

Synonyms
- Cytoria monticola Robineau-Desvoidy, 1863; Dexia albopunctata Roser, 1840; Dexia caminaria Meigen, 1826; Megerlea nitida Robineau-Desvoidy, 1830; Megerlea picea Robineau-Desvoidy, 1830; Melanophora helicivora Goureau, 1843; Melanophora hyalipennis Macquart, 1834; Musca halterata Panzer, 1798; Musca maura Fabricius, 1805; Musca nigrita Scopoli, 1763; Nyctia carceli Robineau-Desvoidy, 1830; Nyctia fuliginaria Rondani, 1862; Nyctia furnaria Rondani, 1862; Nyctia nitida Robineau-Desvoidy, 1830; Nyctia pusilla Robineau-Desvoidy, 1830; Nyctia rubescens Robineau-Desvoidy, 1830; Nyctia servillei Robineau-Desvoidy, 1830; Nyctia vivida Robineau-Desvoidy, 1863; Stygina obscurata Robineau-Desvoidy, 1863; Stygina usta Robineau-Desvoidy, 1863

= Nyctia halterata =

Species of fly

Nyctia halterata is a species of true flies in the family Sarcophagidae.
