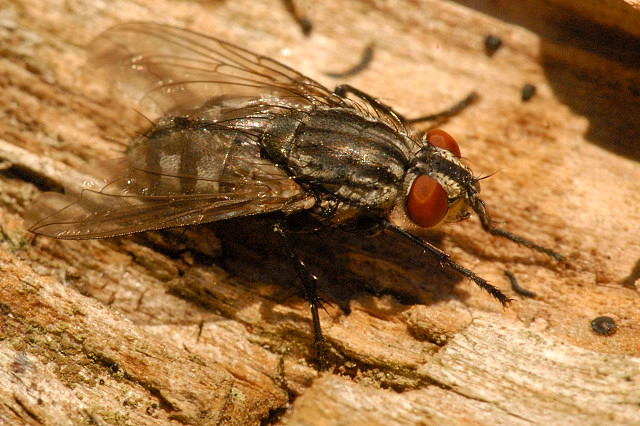

Scientific classification
- Domain: Eukaryota
- Kingdom: Animalia
- Phylum: Arthropoda
- Class: Insecta
- Order: Diptera
- Family: Sarcophagidae
- Genus: Brachicoma
- Species: B. devia

Binomial name
- Brachicoma devia (Fállen, 1820)

Synonyms
- Tachina devia Fállen, 1820

= Brachicoma devia =

Species of fly

Brachicoma devia is a species of flesh fly belonging to genus of Brachicoma. This species sometimes associated with various bumblebees (Bombus sp), as its larvae are parasitic on the developing bumblebee larvae.

== Life cycle and behavior ==
Brachicoma devia has a unique life cycle that involves invading bumblebee nests and laying their living larvae on the skins of the unsuspecting bumblebee larvae. These larvae do not want a small bumblebee larva to feed upon, they want a larger one to sustain them for their own development.

The adult flies are diurnal and can be seen flying around various habitats, although they are associated with bumblebees. They are very difficult to identify to species level without microscopic examination, so they will need to be checked in detail unless confirmed by a recognised expert.

== Impact on bumblebees ==
Brachicoma devia is one of the many natural enemies and pests that bumblebees face during their lives. They can reduce the reproductive success of the bumblebee colonies by killing or weakening their larvae. They may also transmit diseases or pathogens to the bumblebees.
