= Wohlfahrtia africana =

Scientific classification
- Kingdom: Animalia
- Phylum: Arthropoda
- Class: Insecta
- Order: Diptera
- Family: Sarcophagidae
- Genus: Wohlfahrtia
- Species: W. africana

Binomial name
- Wohlfahrtia africana Verves, 1985

Species of fly

Wohlfahrtia africana is a species of flesh fly in the family Sarcophagidae.

== Range ==
Nigeria.
