= Acrocephalomyia torulosa =

Scientific classification
- Kingdom: Animalia
- Phylum: Arthropoda
- Class: Insecta
- Order: Diptera
- Family: Ropalomeridae
- Genus: Acrocephalomyia
- Species: A. torulosa

Binomial name
- Acrocephalomyia torulosa Alvim & Ale-Rocha, 2016

Species of fly

Acrocephalomyia torulosa is a species of fly in the genus Acrocephalomyia of the family Ropalomeridae.

== Range ==
Acrocephalomyia torulosa is only known from the type locality, Dourados, in the Mato Grosso do Sul state of Brazil.
