= Wohlfahrtia balassogloi =

Scientific classification
- Kingdom: Animalia
- Phylum: Arthropoda
- Class: Insecta
- Order: Diptera
- Family: Sarcophagidae
- Genus: Wohlfahrtia
- Species: W. balassogloi

Binomial name
- Wohlfahrtia balassogloi (Portschinsky, 1881)

Species of fly

Wohlfahrtia balassogloi is a species of flesh fly in the family Sarcophagidae.

== Range ==
Russia.
