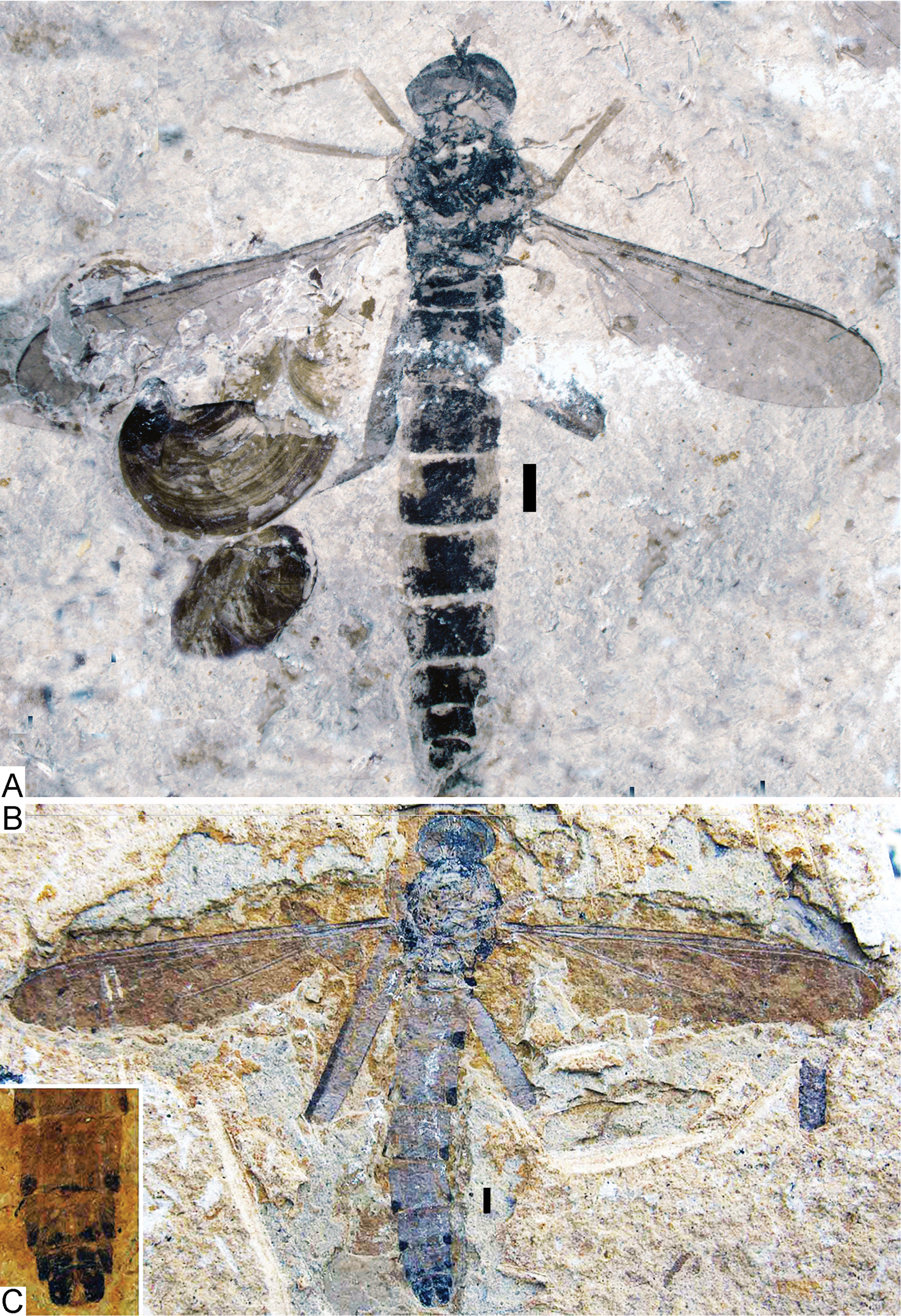
- Archirhagio mostovskii (top) and A. zhangi (bottom)

Scientific classification
- Kingdom: Animalia
- Phylum: Arthropoda
- Class: Insecta
- Order: Diptera
- Superfamily: †Archisargoidea
- Family: †Archisargidae; Rohdendorf 1962

Genera
- See text

= Archisargidae =

Archisargidae Temporal range: Callovian–Aptian

Extinct family of flies

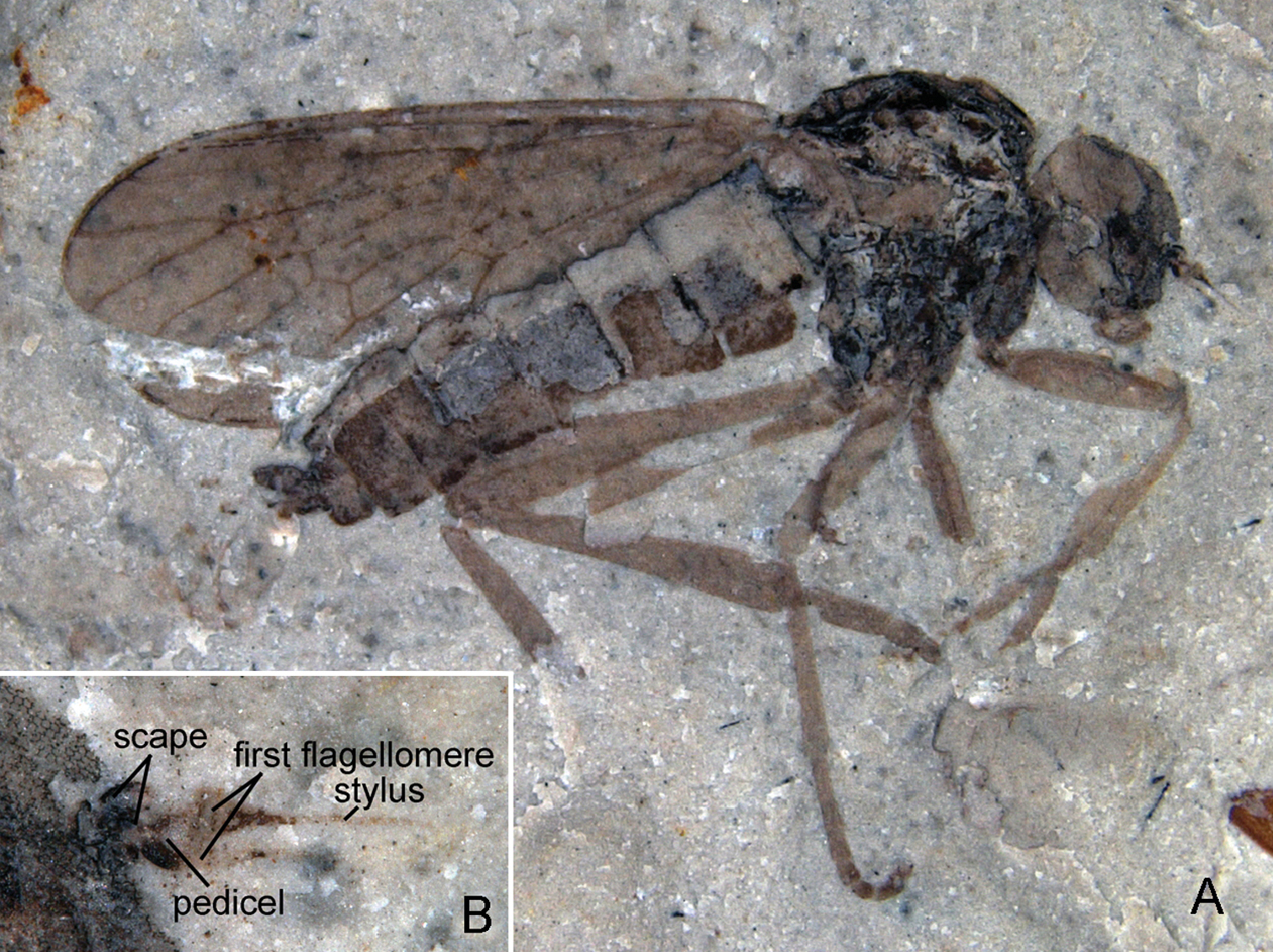
Male Mesosolva sp.

Archisargidae is an extinct family of brachyceran flies known from the Jurassic and Cretaceous periods. It is part of the extinct superfamily Archisargoidea. Most members of the family are known from the Callovian-Oxfordian Daohugou biota of Inner Mongolia, China, and the equivalently aged Karabastau Formation of Kazakhstan. The family has been found to be paraphyletic with respect to Eremochaetidae in a cladistic analysis.

== Taxonomy ==
- †subfamily Archisarginae Rohdendorf 1962
  - †Archirhagio Rohdendorf 1938
    - †Archirhagio gracilentus Wang et al. 2017 Daohugou, China, Callovian
    - †Archirhagio obscurus Rohdendorf 1938 Karabastau Formation, Kazakhstan, Oxfordian
    - †Archirhagio striatus Zhang and Zhang 2003 Daohugou, China, Callovian
    - †Archirhagio varius Zhang 2014 Daohugou, China, Callovian
    - †Archirhagio zhangi Zhang et al. 2009 Tiaojishan Formation, China, Callovian
  - †Archisargus Rohdendorf 1938
    - †Archisargus maximus Mostovski 1997 Karabastau Formation, Kazakhstan, Oxfordian
    - †Archisargus pulcher Rohdendorf 1938 Karabastau Formation, Kazakhstan, Oxfordian
    - †Archisargus spurivenius Zhang et al. 2007a Daohugou, China, Callovian
    - †Archisargus strigatus Zhang et al. 2007a Daohugou, China, Callovian
  - †Calosargus Mostovski 1997
    - †Calosargus (Calosargus) Mostovski 1997
      - †Calosargus (Calosargus) antiquus Zhang et al. 2007b Daohugou, China, Callovian
      - †Calosargus (Calosargus) bellus Zhang et al. 2007b Daohugou, China, Callovian
      - †Calosargus (Calosargus) daohugouensis Zhang et al. 2007b Daohugou, China, Callovian
      - †Calosargus (Calosargus) hani Zhang et al. 2007b Daohugou, China, Callovian
      - †Calosargus (Calosargus) niger Mostovski 1997 Karabastau Formation, Kazakhstan, Oxfordian
      - †Calosargus (Calosargus) talbragarensis Oberprieler and Yeates 2012 Talbragar Fossil Bed, Australia, Tithonian
      - †Calosargus (Calosargus) tatianae Mostovski 1997 Karabastau Formation, Kazakhstan, Oxfordian
      - †Calosargus (Calosargus) tenuicellulatus Zhang et al. 2007b Daohugou, China, Callovian
      - †Calosargus (Calosargus) validus Zhang et al. 2007b Daohugou, China, Callovian
    - †Calosargus (Pterosargus) Mostovski 1997
      - †Calosargus (Pterosargus) sinicus Zhang 2010 Daohugou, China, Callovian
      - †Calosargus (Pterosargus) thanasymus Mostovski 1997 Karabastau Formation, Kazakhstan, Oxfordian
    - †Calosargus tatianae Mostovski 1997 Karabastau Formation, Kazakhstan, Oxfordian
  - †Flagellisargus Zhang 2012
    - †Flagellisargus robustus Zhang 2012 Daohugou, China, Callovian
    - †Flagellisargus sinicus Zhang 2012 Daohugou, China, Callovian
    - †Flagellisargus venustus Zhang 2012 Daohugou, China, Callovian
  - †Mesosolva Hong 1983
    - †Mesosolva angustocellulata Mostovski 1996 Karabastau Formation, Kazakhstan, Oxfordian
    - †Mesosolva balyshevae Mostovski 1996 Karabastau Formation, Kazakhstan, Oxfordian
    - †Mesosolva daohugouensis Zhang and Zhang 2003 Daohugou, China, Callovian
    - †Mesosolva dolosa Mostovski 1996 Karabastau Formation, Kazakhstan, Oxfordian
    - †Mesosolva hennigi Mostovski 1996 Karabastau Formation, Kazakhstan, Oxfordian
    - †Mesosolva huabeiensis (Hong 1983) Haifanggou Formation, China, Callovian
    - †Mesosolva imperfecta Mostovski 1996 Karabastau Formation, Kazakhstan, Oxfordian
    - †Mesosolva karataviensis (Mostovski 1996) Karabastau Formation, Kazakhstan, Oxfordian
    - †Mesosolva longivena Mostovski 1996 Shar Teeg, Mongolia, Tithonian
    - †Mesosolva parva Hong 1983 Haifanggou Formation, China, Callovian
    - †Mesosolva rohdendorfi Mostovski 1996 Karabastau Formation, Kazakhstan, Oxfordian
    - †Mesosolva sinensis Zhang et al. 2010 Daohugou, China, Callovian
    - †Mesosolva zhangae Zhang 2012 Daohugou, China, Callovian
  - †Novisargus Zhang 2014
    - †Novisargus rarus Zhang 2014 Daohugou, China, Callovian
  - †Origoasilus Zhang et al. 2011
    - †Origoasilus pingquanensis Zhang et al. 2011 Yixian Formation, China, Aptian
  - †Parvisargus Mostovski 1996
    - †Parvisargus malus Mostovski 1996 Karabastau Formation, Kazakhstan, Oxfordian
    - †Parvisargus peior Mostovski 1996 Karabastau Formation, Kazakhstan, Oxfordian
  - †Sharasargus Mostovski 1996
    - †Sharasargus fortis Zhang et al. 2008 Daohugou, China, Callovian
    - †Sharasargus maculus Zhang 2014 Daohugou, China, Callovian
    - †Sharasargus oresbius (Ren 1998) Yixian Formation, China, Aptian
    - †Sharasargus ruptus Mostovski 1996 Shar Teeg, Mongolia, Tithonian
    - †Sharasargus spiniger Mostovski 1996 Karabastau Formation, Kazakhstan, Oxfordian
  - †Sinallomyia Zhang 2012
    - †Sinallomyia ruderalis (Ren 1998) Yixian Formation, China, Aptian
  - †Tabanisargus Zhang 2014
    - †Tabanisargus daohugouensis Zhang 2014 Daohugou, China, Callovian
- †subfamily Uranorhagioninae Zhang et al. 2010 Grimaldi 2016 suggests that this grouping does not belong to the superfamily.
  - †Daohugosargus Zhang 2012
    - †Daohugosargus eximius (Zhang et al. 2008) Daohugou, China, Callovian
  - †Uranorhagio Zhang et al. 2010
    - †Uranorhagio asymmetricus (Zhang et al. 2010) Daohugou, China, Callovian
    - †Uranorhagio daohugouensis Zhang et al. 2010 Daohugou, China, Callovian
    - †Uranorhagio deviatus (Zhang et al. 2010) Daohugou, China, Callovian
