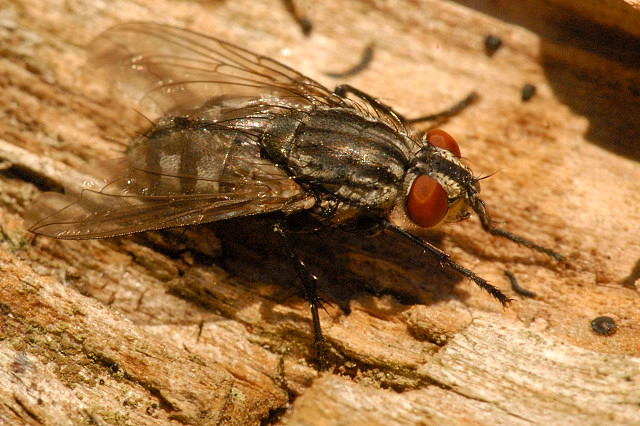
- Brachicoma devia

Scientific classification
- Kingdom: Animalia
- Phylum: Arthropoda
- Clade: Pancrustacea
- Class: Insecta
- Order: Diptera
- Family: Sarcophagidae
- Subfamily: Paramacronychiinae
- Genus: Brachicoma; Rondani, 1856

Type species
- Tachina nitidula Fallén, 1820

Synonyms
- Bombobrachycoma Townsend, 1919; Brachycoma Meade, 1892; Bracihcoma Rondani, 1859; Kennesawmyia Dodge, 1956; Lacchoprosopa Dobroscky, 1925; Laccoprosopa Townsend, 1891; Oppia Robineau-Desvoidy, 1863

= Brachicoma =

Genus of flies

Brachicoma is a genus of true flies in the family Sarcophagidae.

== Species ==
- B. asiatica Rohdendorf & Verves, 1979
- B. borealis Ringdahl, 1932
- B. devia (Fallén, 1820)
- B. nigra Chao & Zhang, 1988
- B. papei Verves, 1990
- B. sarcophagina (Townsend, 1891)
- B. setosa Coquillett, 1902
