= Rhytidops =

Scientific classification
- Domain: Eukaryota
- Kingdom: Animalia
- Phylum: Arthropoda
- Class: Insecta
- Order: Diptera
- Family: Ropalomeridae
- Genus: Rhytidops; Lindner, 1930

Genus of flies

Rhytidops is a genus of flies in the family Ropalomeridae. There are at least two described species in Rhytidops.

== Species ==
These two species belong to the genus Rhytidops:

- Rhytidops chacoensis Lindner, 1930
- Rhytidops floridensis (Aldrich, 1932)
