= Acrocephalomyia =

Scientific classification
- Domain: Eukaryota
- Kingdom: Animalia
- Phylum: Arthropoda
- Class: Insecta
- Order: Diptera
- Family: Ropalomeridae
- Genus: Acrocephalomyia; Ibáñez-Bernal & Hernández-Ortiz, 2012

Genus of flies

Acrocephalomyia is a genus of flies in the family Ropalomeridae. It contains three recognized species.

== Species ==
- Acrocephalomyia pulchra Alvim & Ale-Rocha, 2016
- Acrocephalomyia torulosa Alvim & Ale-Rocha, 2016
- Acrocephalomyia zumbadoi Ibáñez-Bernal & Hernández-Ortiz, 2012
