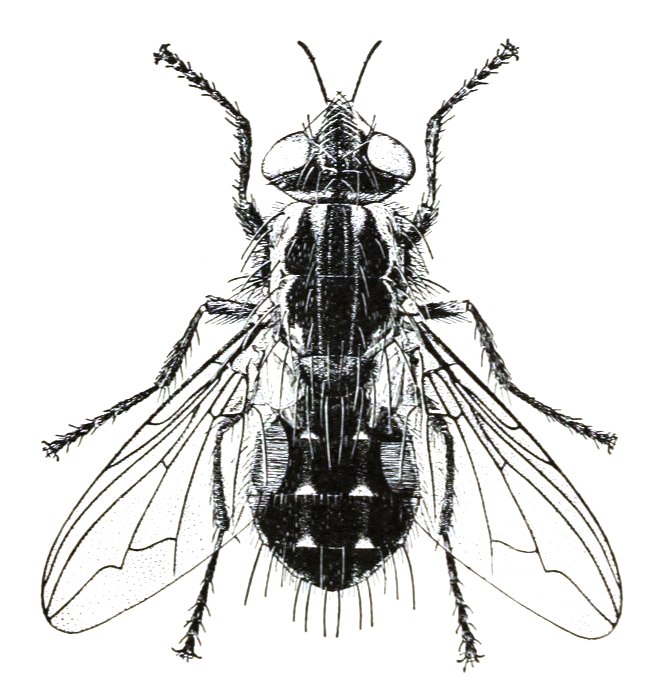
- Wohlfahrtia vigil (female)

Scientific classification
- Kingdom: Animalia
- Phylum: Arthropoda
- Class: Insecta
- Order: Diptera
- Family: Sarcophagidae
- Genus: Wohlfahrtia
- Species: W. vigil

Binomial name
- Wohlfahrtia vigil (Walker, 1849)

Synonyms
- Paraphyto chittendeni Coquillett, 1895; Paraphyto opaca Coquillett, 1897; Sarcophaga vigil Walker, 1849; Sarcophila meigenii Schiner, 1862

= Wohlfahrtia vigil =

Species of fly

Wohlfahrtia vigil, known generally as the fox maggot or myiasis fly, is a species of flesh fly in the family Sarcophagidae.
