= Larger brachycera =

The larger brachycera is a name which refers to flies in the following families of the suborder Brachycera:

- Acroceridae – hunch-back flies
- Asilidae – robber flies
- Athericidae – water snipe flies
- Bombyliidae – bee flies
- Rhagionidae – snipe flies
- Scenopinidae – window flies
- Stratiomyidae – soldier flies
- Tabanidae – horse flies
- Therevidae – stiletto flies
- Xylomyidae – wood soldier flies
- Xylophagidae – awl-flies
