= Cestrotus elegans =

Scientific classification
- Domain: Eukaryota
- Kingdom: Animalia
- Phylum: Arthropoda
- Class: Insecta
- Order: Diptera
- Family: Lauxaniidae
- Subfamily: Homoneurinae
- Genus: Cestrotus
- Species: C. elegans

Binomial name
- Cestrotus elegans Hendel, 1920

Species of fly

Cestrotus elegans is a species of brachyceran flies in the family Lauxaniidae. It is found in Ethiopia and Morocco.
