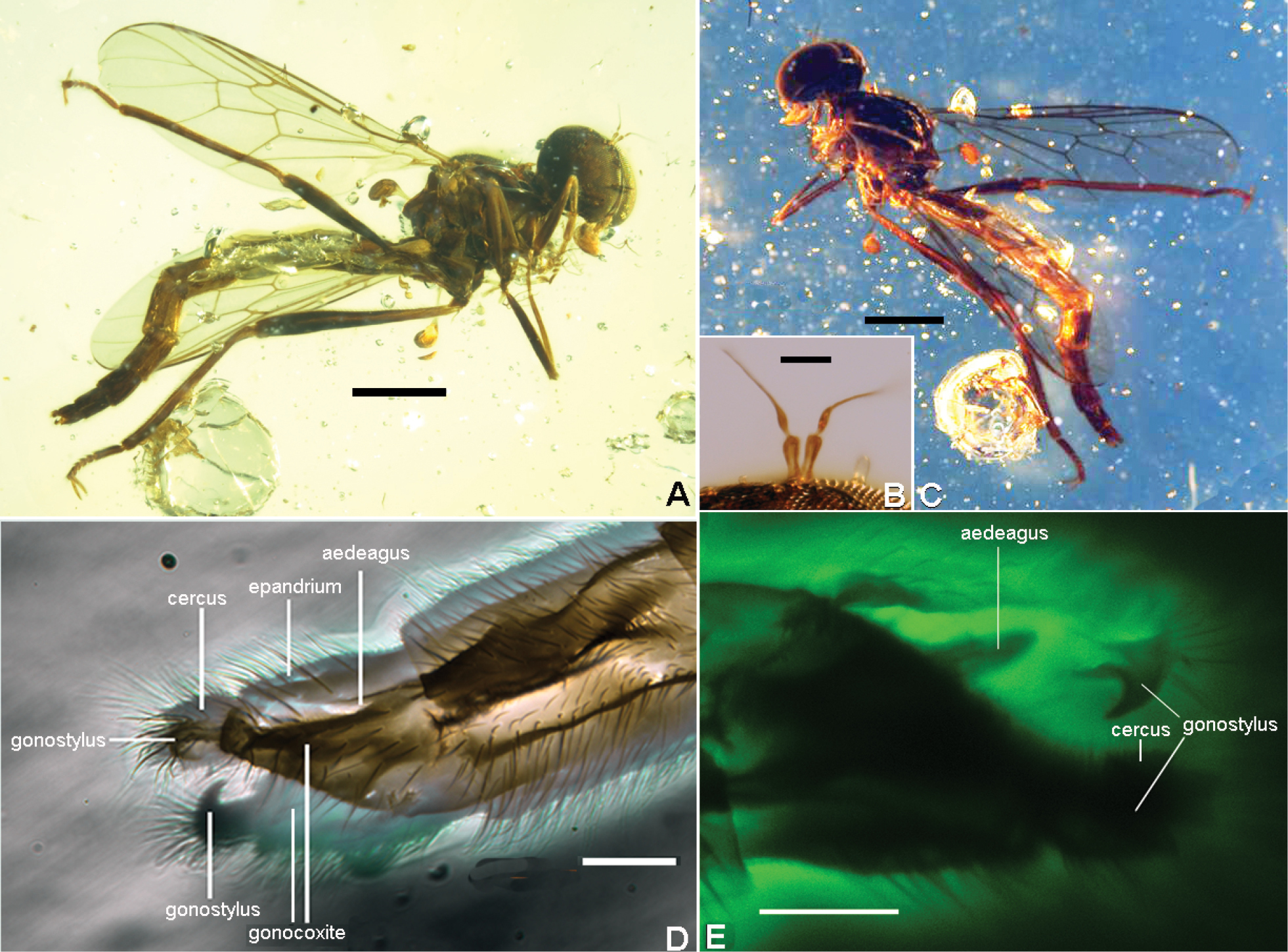

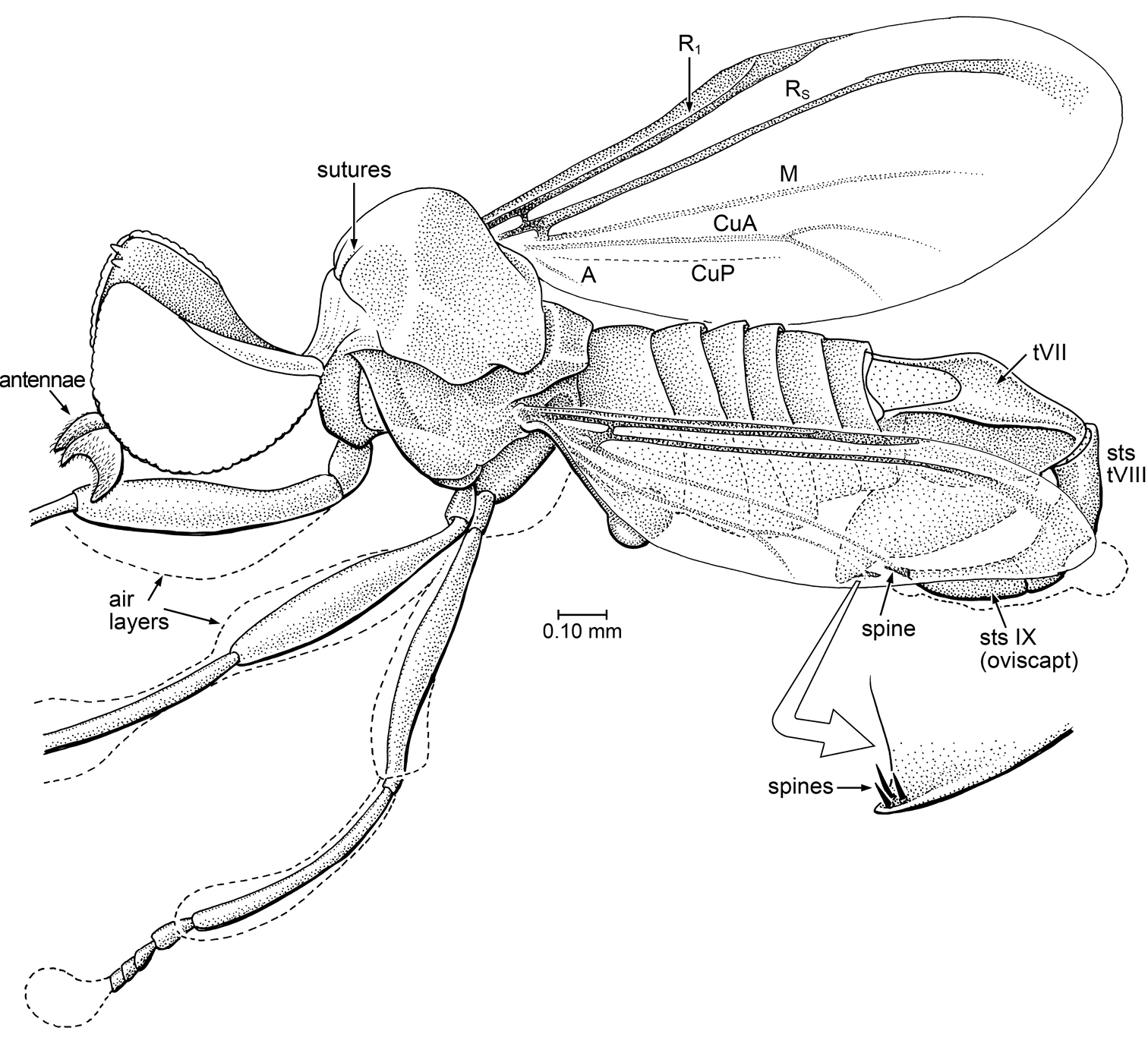
- Zhenia xiai (Eremochaetidae, top) and Tethepomyia zigrasi (Tethepomyiidae, bottom)

Scientific classification
- Kingdom: Animalia
- Phylum: Arthropoda
- Class: Insecta
- Order: Diptera
- Suborder: Brachycera
- Superfamily: †Archisargoidea; Rohdendorf 1962

Families
- †Archisargidae Rohdendorf 1962; †Eremochaetidae Ussatchov 1968; †Kovalevisargidae Mostovski 1997; †Tethepomyiidae Grimaldi and Arillo 2008

= Archisargoidea =

Archisargoidea Temporal range: Callovian–Turonian

Extinct superfamily of flies

Archisargoidea is an extinct superfamily of brachyceran flies known from the late Middle Jurassic (Callovian) to early Late Cretaceous (Turonian). Most flies in the superfamily have large eyes and an elongated abdomen, preserved females have a sharp, piercing oviscapt used for injecting eggs into host matter. Their relationships with other members of Brachycera is controversial, they are usually considered close relatives of either Stratiomyomorpha or Muscomorpha. Internal relationships between the families are uncertain and the topology of the only cladistic analysis of the family was weakly supported, finding that Archisargidae was paraphyletic with respect to Eremochaetidae and miniaturized Tethepomyiidae. The sharp piercing oviscaps possessed by the group had alternatively been suggested to represent evidence of being parasitoids, injecting their eggs into hosts similar to parasitic wasps, or to inject eggs into plant material like rotting wood or fruit, similar to members of Tephritoidea.
