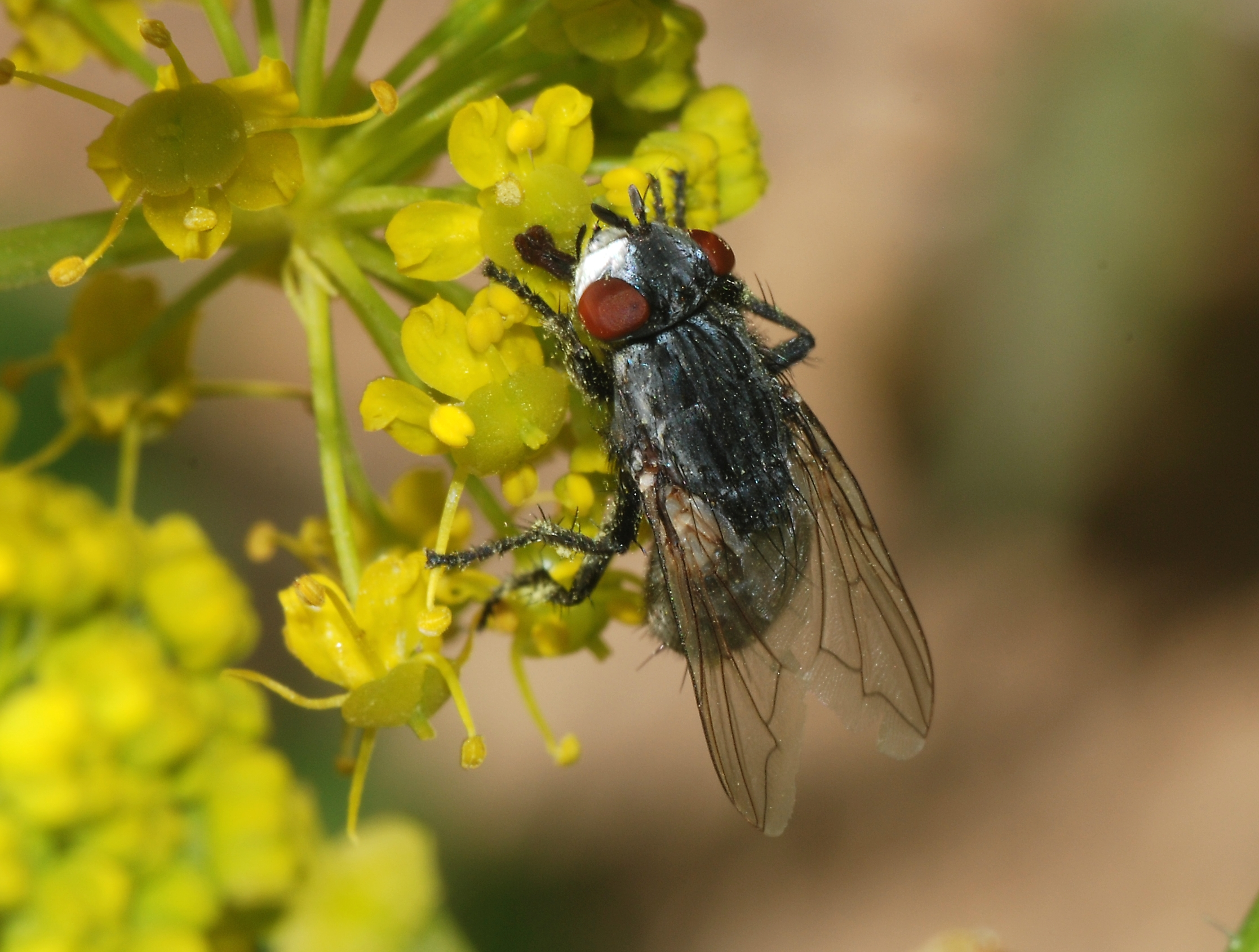

Scientific classification
- Kingdom: Animalia
- Phylum: Arthropoda
- Clade: Pancrustacea
- Class: Insecta
- Order: Diptera
- Family: Sarcophagidae
- Genus: Wohlfahrtia
- Species: W. magnifica

Binomial name
- Wohlfahrtia magnifica (Schiner, 1862)

Synonyms
- Sarcophila magnifica Schiner, 1862; Sarcophila wohlfahrti Portschinsky, 1875

= Wohlfahrtia magnifica =

Species of fly

Wohlfahrtia magnifica is the spotted flesh fly, sometimes called the screwworm fly, though species of flies from other families go by this name. It is a species of fly belonging to the family Sarcophagidae . The adults are about 6–10 mm in length; third-instar larvae are 5–7 mm in length.

== Myiasis ==
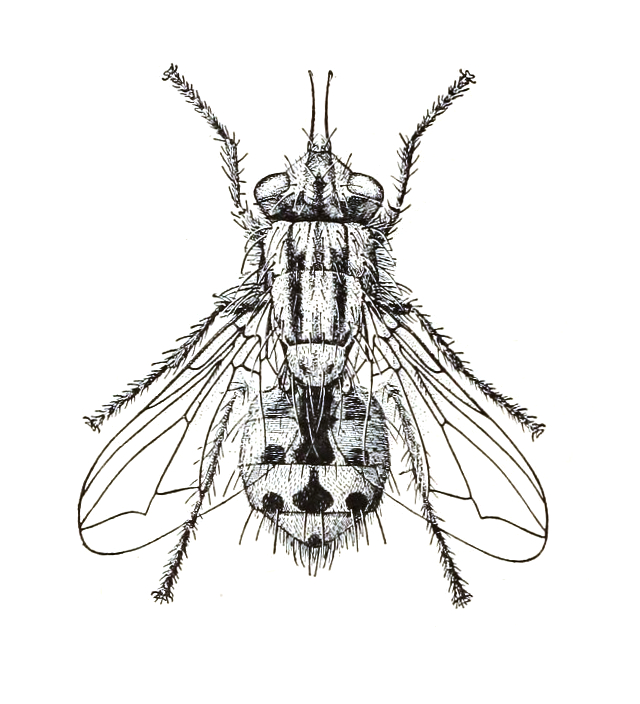
A female

W. magnifica larvae cause myiasis in mammals, mainly in sheep, but also in cattle, goats, horses, and rarely in humans. The fly is larviparous, meaning that it does not participate in oviposition and instead gives birth to batches of live larvae, usually in the range of 120-170 specimens at a time. In sheep, the larvae chiefly infest genitalia or open wounds. In humans, W. magnifica larvae may infest the ear, eye, mouth, or nose, damaging living tissues; they may also infest open wounds, including after surgery.

== Distribution ==
W. magnifica is found in southern Europe, Central Asia, the Middle East, North Africa, and China. Their range is increasing, believed to be because of the spread of intensive sheep rearing.

== Similar species ==
The larvae of the North American species, W. vigil and W. opaca, are incapable of penetrating adult skin; infestation occurs only in infants.
