= Rhytidops floridensis =

Scientific classification
- Domain: Eukaryota
- Kingdom: Animalia
- Phylum: Arthropoda
- Class: Insecta
- Order: Diptera
- Family: Ropalomeridae
- Genus: Rhytidops
- Species: R. floridensis

Binomial name
- Rhytidops floridensis (Aldrich, 1932)

Synonyms
- Kroeberia floridensis Aldrich, 1932

Species of fly

Rhytidops floridensis is a species of fly in the family Ropalomeridae.
