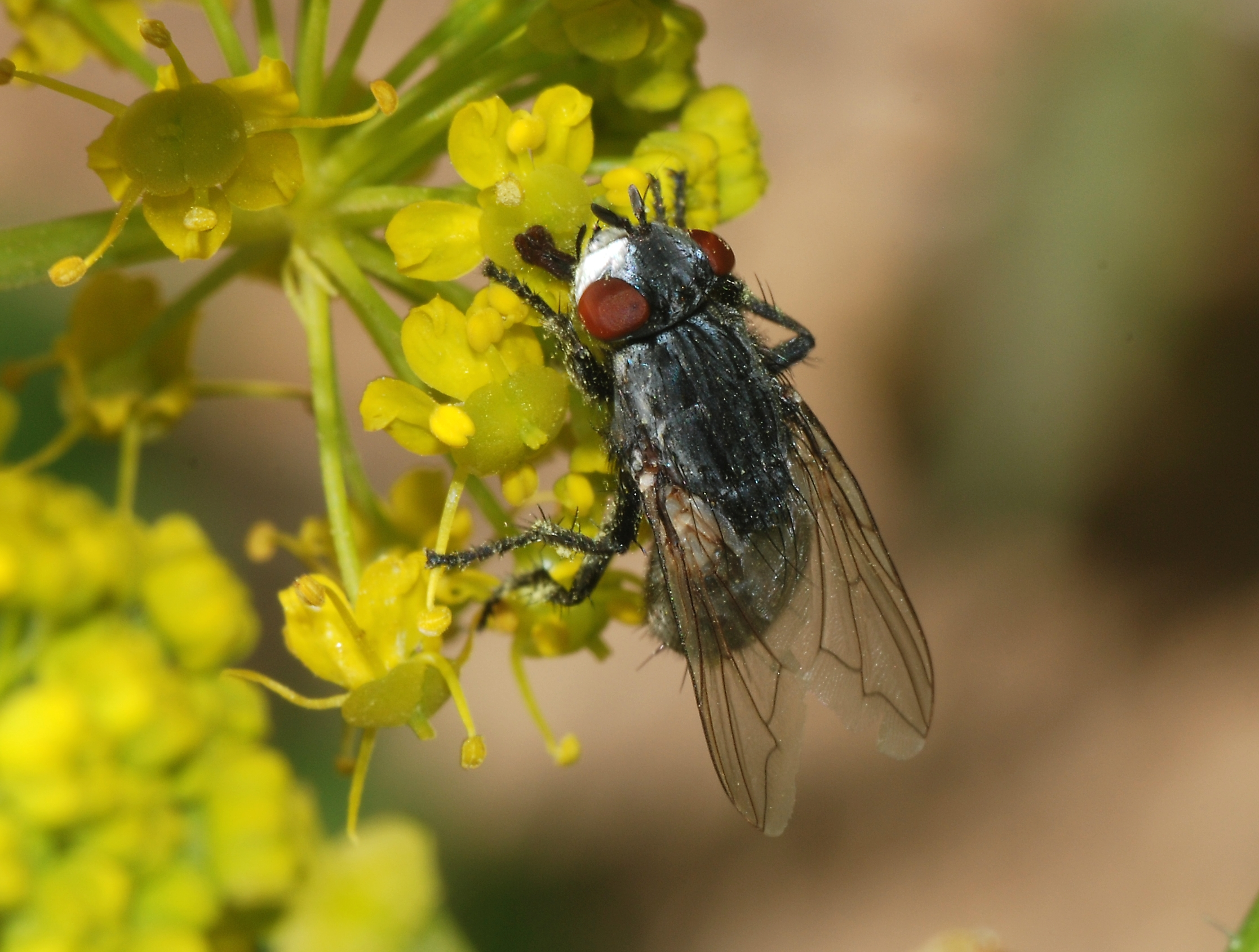
- Wohlfahrtia magnifica

Scientific classification
- Kingdom: Animalia
- Phylum: Arthropoda
- Class: Insecta
- Order: Diptera
- Family: Sarcophagidae
- Subfamily: Paramacronychiinae
- Genus: Wohlfahrtia; Brauer & von Bergenstamm, 1889

Type species
- Sarcophila magnifica Schiner, 1861

Synonyms
- Afrowohlfahrtia Townsend, 1919; Bracia Enderlein, 1934; Disjunctio Pandellé, 1894; Eubracia Enderlein, 1934; Hemibracia Enderlein, 1934; Pandellea Enderlein, 1934; Paraphyto Coquillett, 1895; Wohfartia Mattos, 1926

= Wohlfahrtia =

Genus of flies

Wohlfahrtia is a genus of flesh flies in the family Sarcophagidae. There are at least 20 described species in Wohlfahrtia.

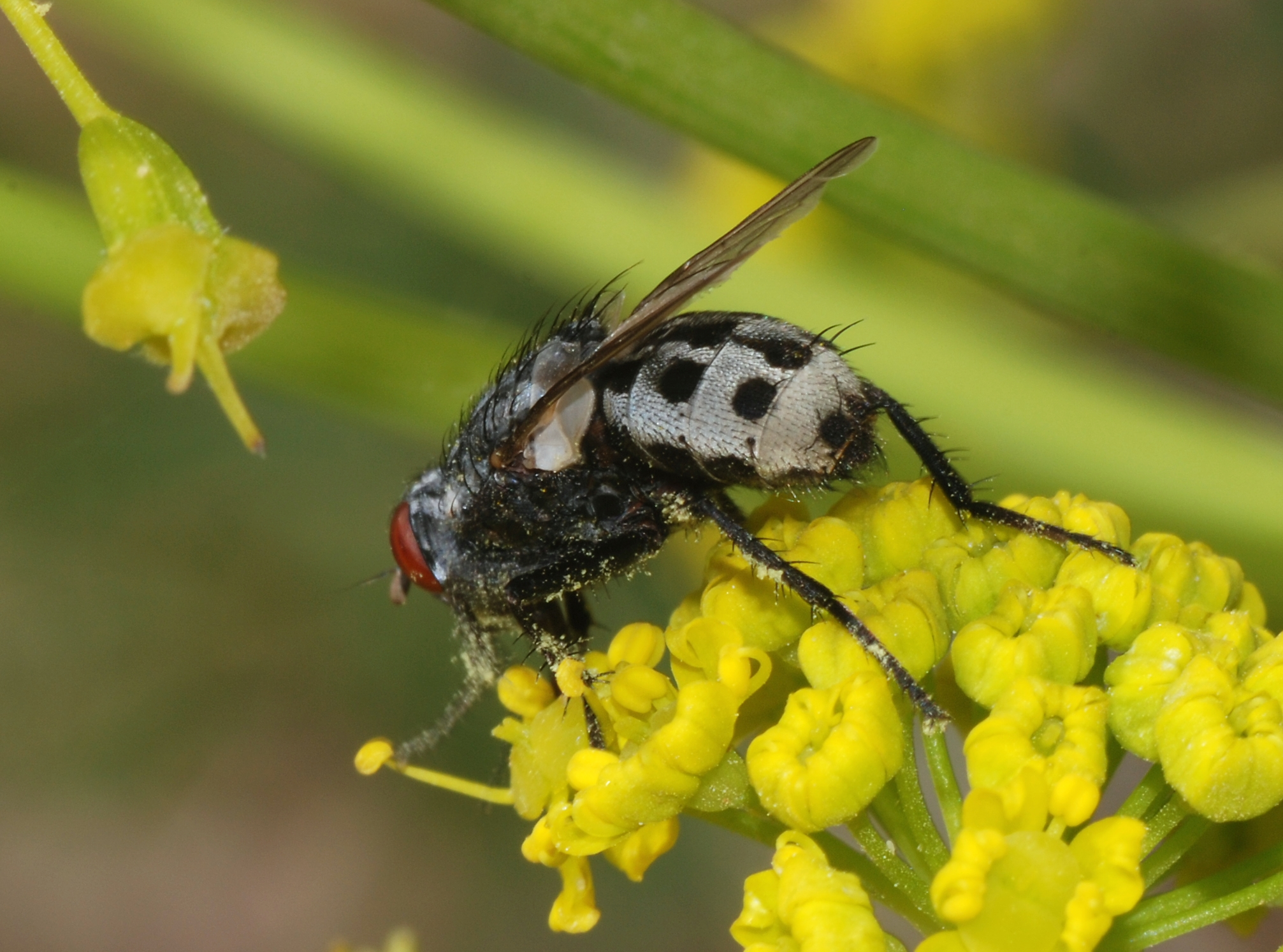
Wohlfahrtia magnifica

== Species ==
These 28 species belong to the genus Wohlfahrtia:

- Wohlfahrtia africana Verves, 1985
- Wohlfahrtia aschersoni (Enderlein, 1934)
- Wohlfahrtia atra Aldrich, 1926^{c g}
- Wohlfahrtia balassogloi (Portschinsky, 1881)
- Wohlfahrtia bella (Macquart, 1839)^{c g}
- Wohlfahrtia brevicornis Cha & Zhang, 1996^{c g}
- Wohlfahrtia brunnipalpis (Macquart, 1851)^{c g}
- Wohlfahrtia cheni Rohdendorf, 1956
- Wohlfahrtia erythrocera Villeneuve, 1910^{c g}
- Wohlfahrtia fedtschenkoi Rohdendorf, 1956
- Wohlfahrtia grunini Rohdendorf, 1969
- Wohlfahrtia hirtiparafacialis Cha & Zhang, 1996^{c g}
- Wohlfahrtia ilanramoni Lehrer, 2003^{c g}
- Wohlfahrtia indigens Villeneuve, 1928
- Wohlfahrtia intermedia (Portschinsky, 1887)
- Wohlfahrtia magnifica (Schiner, 1861)
- Wohlfahrtia nuba (Wiedemann, 1830)^{c g}
- Wohlfahrtia pachytyli (Townsend, 1919)
- Wohlfahrtia pavlovskyi Rohdendorf, 1956
- Wohlfahrtia seguiy Salem, 1938^{c g}
- Wohlfahrtia smarti Salem, 1938
- Wohlfahrtia spinisternum Pape & Zhang, 2018
- Wohlfahrtia stackelbergi Rohdendorf, 1956
- Wohlfahrtia trina (Wiedemann, 1830)^{c g}
- Wohlfahrtia vigil (Walker, 1849)^{i c g b} (fox maggot)
- Wohlfahrtia villeneuvi Salem, 1938

Data sources: i = ITIS, c = Catalogue of Life, g = GBIF, b = Bugguide.net
