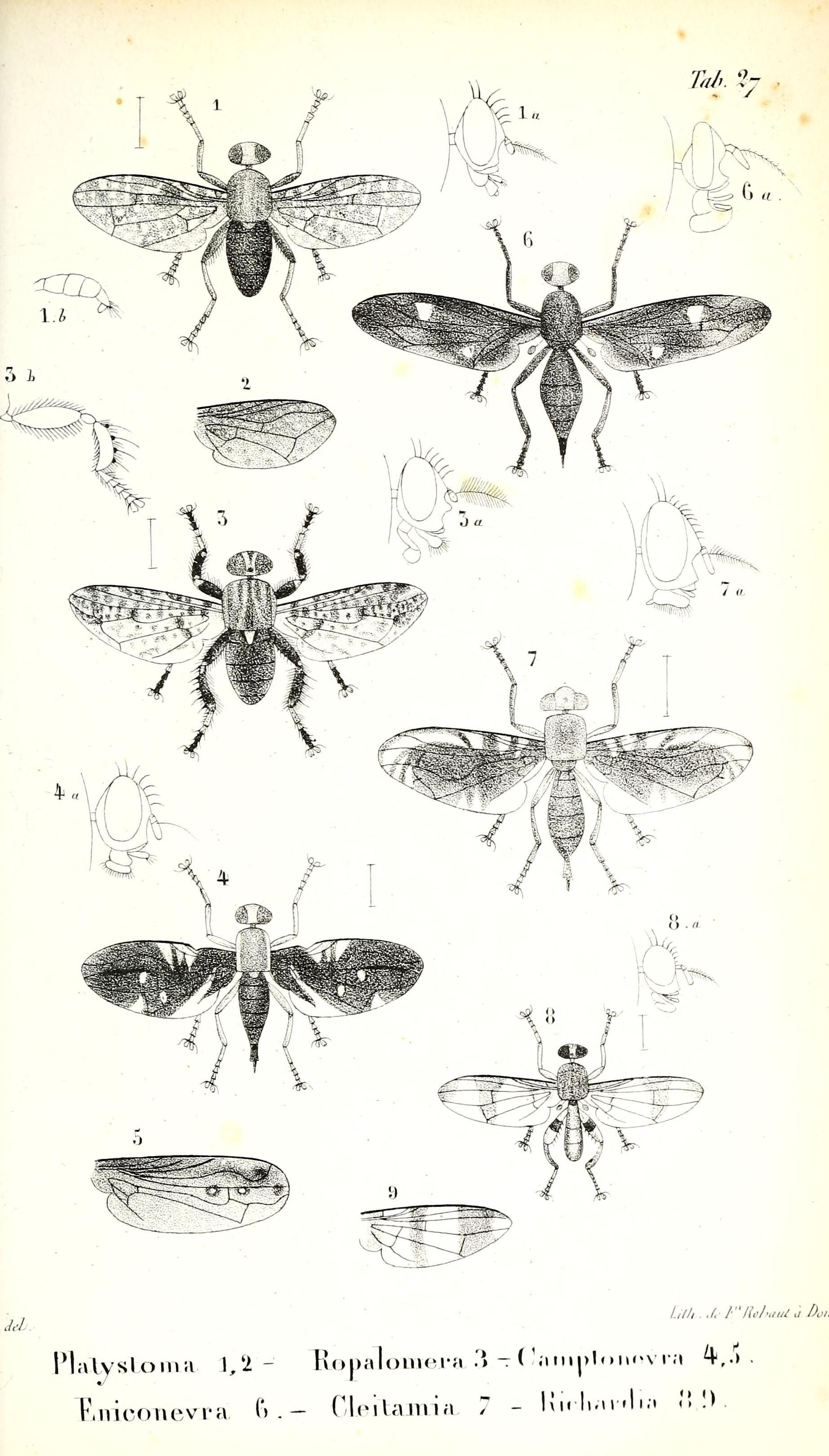
- figure 3

Scientific classification
- Kingdom: Animalia
- Phylum: Arthropoda
- Clade: Pancrustacea
- Class: Insecta
- Order: Diptera
- Section: Schizophora
- Subsection: Acalyptratae
- Superfamily: Sciomyzoidea
- Family: Ropalomeridae; Linder, 1930

Synonyms
- Rhopalomeridae

= Ropalomeridae =

Family of flies

The Ropalomeridae are a family of acalyptrate flies.

== Description ==
Ropalomeridae are robust flies of 6–12 mm (0.24–0.47 in) body length, with a superficial resemblance to the Sarcophagidae in terms of body colour. The hind femora are conspicuously enlarged and the hind tibia is often laterally flattened and broadened and with broad, excavated vertex.

== Biology ==
The biology of ropalomerid flies is little known, although they are thought to associated with rotting wood.

== Classification ==
The Ropalomeridae currently comprise about 30 species distributed in 9 genera. Ropalomera is by far the largest genus of the family, with 15 known species.

These nine genera belong to the family Ropalomeridae:

- Acrocephalomyia Ibáñez-Bernal & Hernández-Ortiz, 2012^{g}
- Apophorhynchus Williston, 1895^{c g}
- Dactylissa Fischer, 1932^{c g}
- Kroeberia Linder, 1930^{c g}
- Lenkokroeberia Prado, 1966^{c g}
- Mexicoa Steyskal, 1947^{i c g}
- Rhytidops Lindner, 1930^{i c g b}
- Ropalomera Wiedemann, 1824^{i c g}
- Willistoniella Mik, 1895^{i c g}

Data sources: i = ITIS, c = Catalogue of Life, g = GBIF, b = Bugguide.net

== Distribution ==
The Ropalomeridae are predominantly Neotropical, found from the southern United States to northern Argentina, with a single species (Rhytidops floridensis) known from the Nearctic realm. Most species occur in the central portion of South America.
