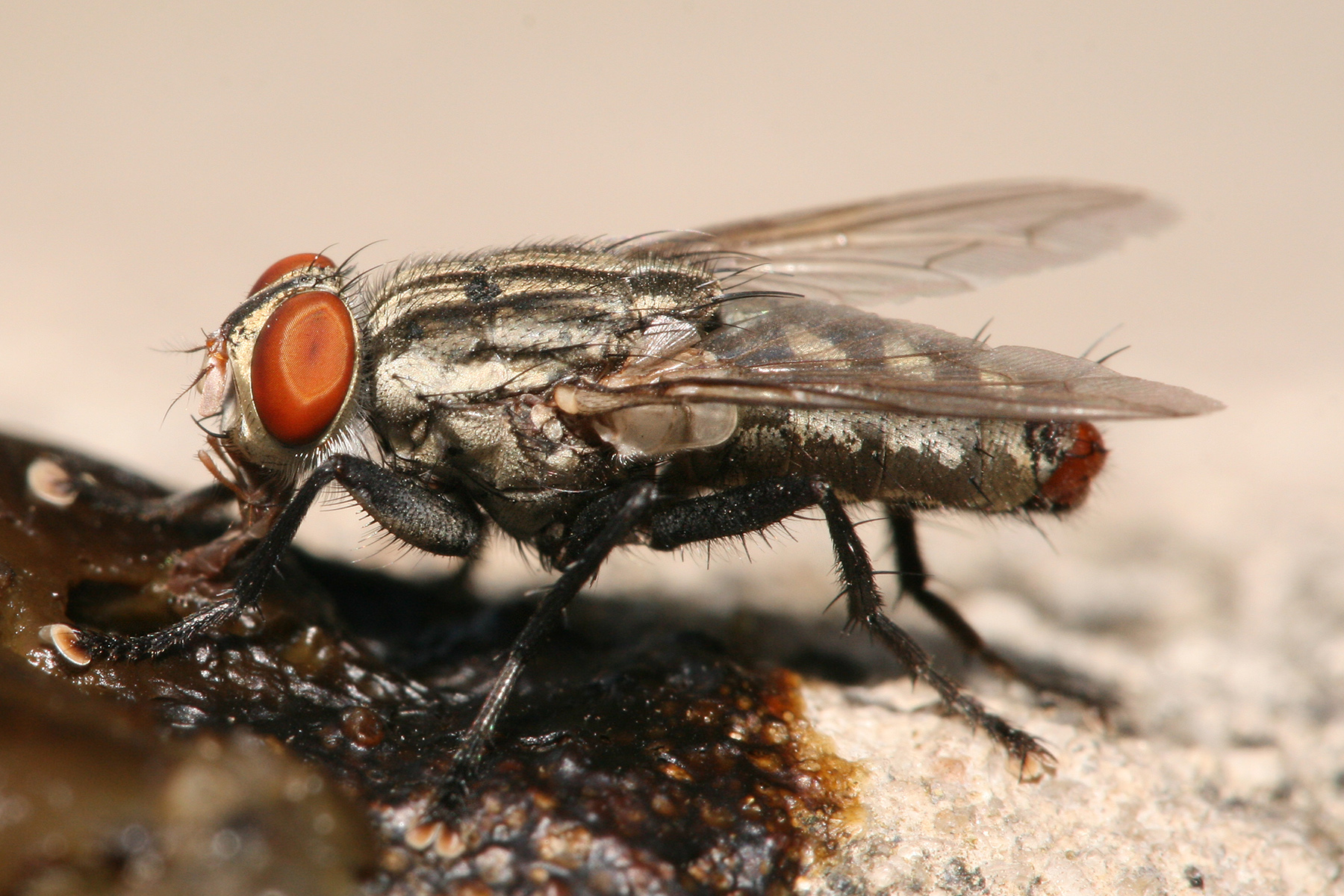
- Sarcophaga bercaea eating dung

Scientific classification
- Kingdom: Animalia
- Phylum: Arthropoda
- Clade: Pancrustacea
- Class: Insecta
- Order: Diptera
- Section: Schizophora
- Subsection: Calyptratae
- Superfamily: Oestroidea
- Family: Sarcophagidae; Macquart, 1834

Subfamilies
- Miltogramminae; Paramacronychiinae; Sarcophaginae

= Flesh fly =

Flesh flies

Family of insects

Sarcophagidae (from Ancient Greek σάρξ sárx 'flesh' and φαγεῖν phageîn 'to eat') are a family of flies commonly known as flesh flies. They differ from most flies in that they are ovoviviparous, opportunistically depositing hatched or hatching maggots instead of eggs on carrion, dung, decaying material, or open wounds of mammals, hence their common name. Some flesh fly larvae are internal parasites of other insects such as Orthoptera, and some, in particular the Miltogramminae, are kleptoparasites of solitary Hymenoptera. The adults mostly feed on fluids from animal bodies, nectar, sweet foods, fluids from animal waste and other organic substances. Juveniles need protein to develop and may be laid on carrion, dung or sweet plant foods (including fruit, nuts, and artificial foodstuffs).

== Diagnostic characteristics ==
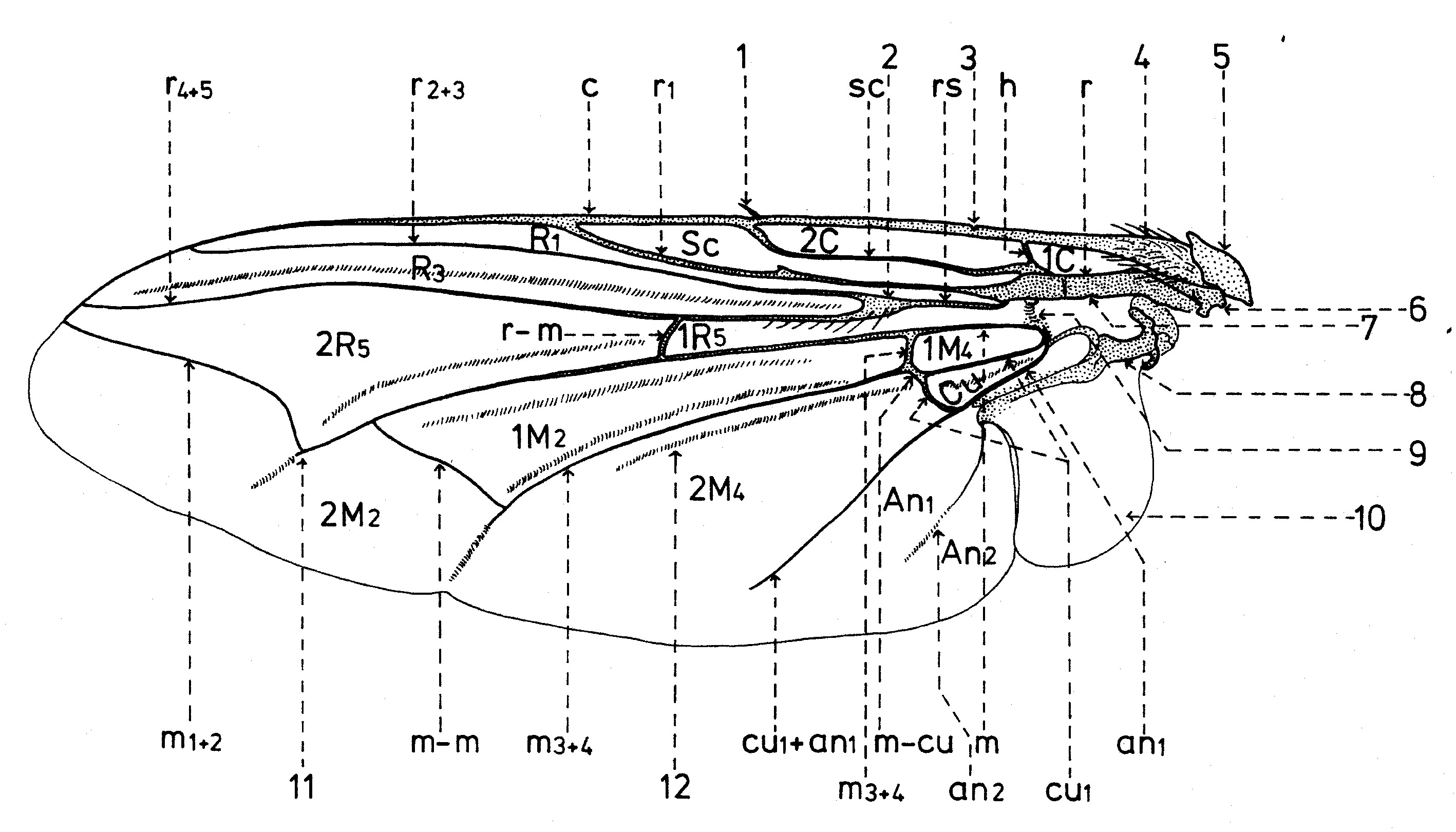
Wing venation of Sarcophagidae

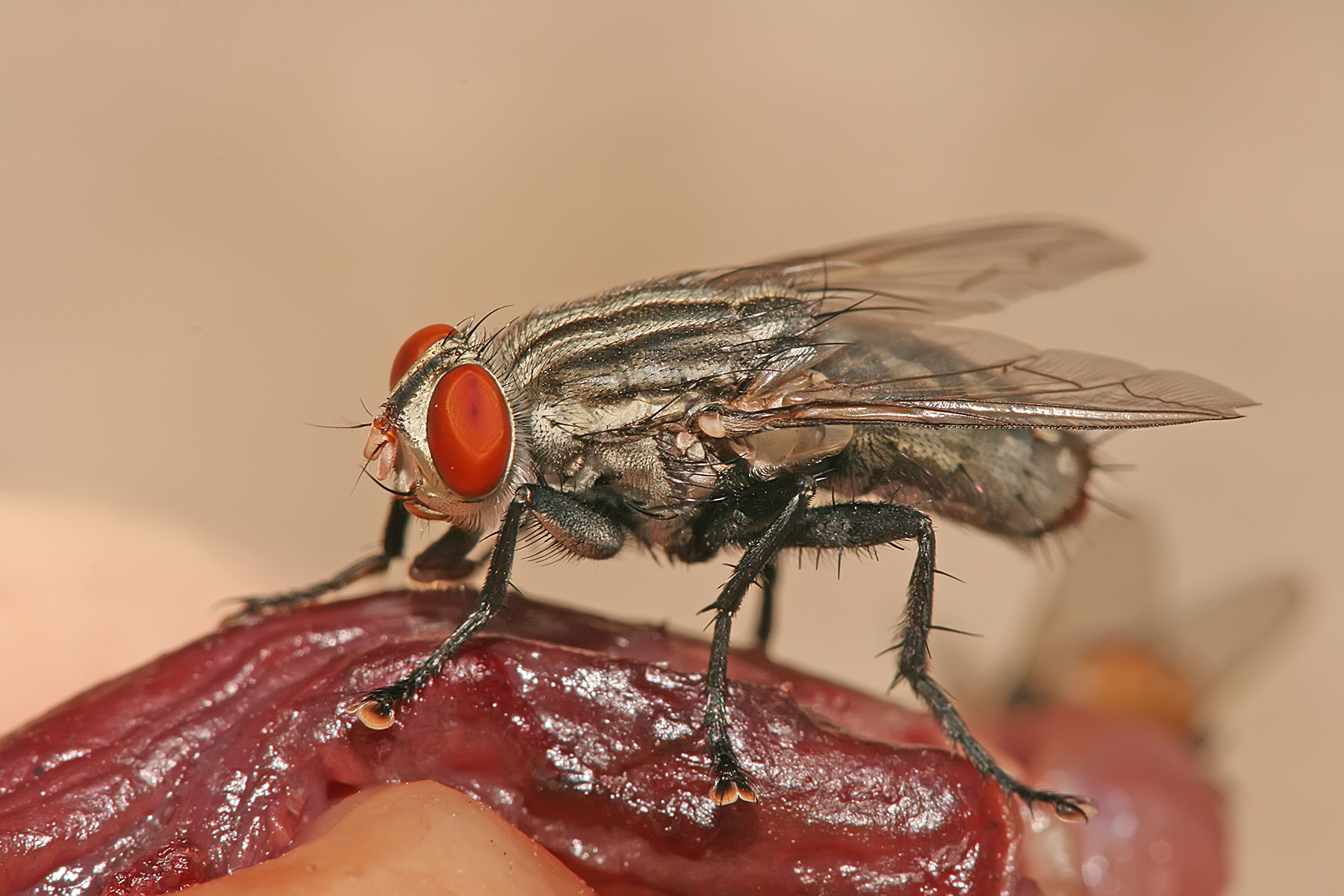
Sarcophaga nodosa feeding on decaying flesh

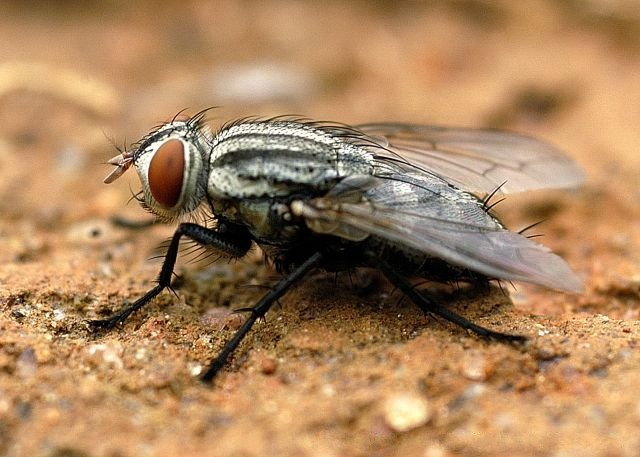
Sarcophagid showing basally plumose arista

Sarcophagid showing abdomen and legs

Members of the subfamily Sarcophaginae are small to large flies 0.16–0.9 inches (4.1–22.9 mm) with black and gray longitudinal stripes on the thorax and checkering on the abdomen. Other key features include red eyes and a bristled abdomen. Abdominal sternites II and III are free and cover the margins of tergites. The posthumeral bristles are one or two in number, with the outermost pair missing.

The presutural bristle is located lower than the notopleural bristle, and closer to the notopleural bristle than to the outermost posthumeral bristle. The presutural bristle is located higher than or level with the posthumeral bristle. The hindmost posthumeral bristle is located even with or toward the midline from the presutural bristle. Four notopleural bristles are present and arranged in the order - short, long, short, long - from front to rear.

Vein M1 +2 (anterior transverse vein, medial vein 1+2 ) is always present, and the cubitulus is strongly bent at right angles or acute; vein Rs is dibranched.

The eyes are smooth and very rarely hairy.

The arista is plumose in its basal half, or rarely pubescent or glabrous.

== Taxonomy ==
The family contains three subfamilies, the Miltogramminae, the Paramacronychiinae, and the Sarcophaginae, containing between them 108 genera. About 2500 species are in this family.

== Biology ==
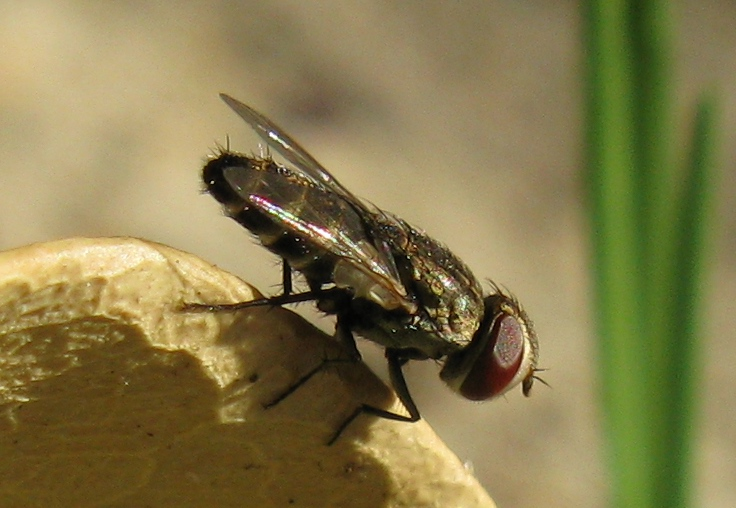
Craticulina is a genus of Miltogramminae. This species is a kleptoparasite of Philanthus. The arista is basally pubescent.

Sarcophaginae : The majority of species in the large genus Sarcophaga are scavengers of small carrion, such as dead insects and snails or smaller vertebrates. A few species feed on larger vertebrate carcasses. Flesh fly maggots occasionally eat other larvae, although this is usually because the other larvae are smaller and get in the way. Flesh flies and their larvae are also known to eat decaying vegetable matter and excrement, and they may be found around compost piles and pit latrines.

Miltogramminae : Members of this subfamily are kleptoparasites of solitary bees and solitary wasps.

Paramacronychiinae : This subfamily includes lepidopteran predators or parasitoids (Agria), predators on immatures (mainly prepupae) of bumblebees (Brachicoma) and generalist scavengers and insect predators (Sarcophila and Wohlfahrtia).

== Association with disease ==
Flesh flies can carry leprosy bacilli and can transmit intestinal pseudomyiasis to people who eat their larvae. Flesh flies, particularly Wohlfahrtia magnifica, can also cause myiasis in animals, mostly to sheep, and can give them blood poisoning, or asymptomatic leprosy infections.

== Identification ==
Generally, only males of this family can reliably be identified to species, and then only by examination of dissected genitalia. The literature is incomplete or scattered for all regions. References include:

- Rokuro Kano; Gordon Field; Satoshi Shinonaga Fauna Japonica: Sarcophagidae (Insecta: Diptera) Biogeographical Society of Japan; distributor: Tokyo Electrical Engineering College Press, 1967.In English.
- Downes, W. L., Jr. Family Sarcophagidae in Stone, A. et al. A catalog of the Diptera of America north of Mexico United States Department of Agriculture, Washington, D.C. 1965.
- Lehrer, A.Z. . Sarcophaginae et Paramacronychiinae du Proche Orient (Insecta, Diptera, Sarcophagidae). Pensoft Series Faunistica 60, ISSN 1312-0174. ISBN 954-642-281-9, Pensoft Publishers, Sofia-Moscow, 165x240, keys, species descriptions, b/w drawings and photos, references, index. In French.(2006).
- Lehrer, A.Z., Sarcophaginae de l'Afrique (Insecta, Diptera, Sarcophagidae) In: Entomologica, Bari, 37(2003):5-528 (in French)
- Lehrer, A.Z., Taxonomic Atlas of the postabdominal structures Sarcophagidae (Insecta, Diptera). Vol. 1 In: Entomologica, Bari, 42 (2010):3-459.
- Pape, T. The Sarcophagidae (Diptera) of Fennoscandia and Denmark. Fauna Entomologica Scandinavica, 19 . Hardback 203 pp., 2 col. plates, 424 figures, in English, 1987. ISBN 90-04-08184-4
- Pape, T. 1998. Sarcophagidae. - pp. 649–678 in: Papp, L. & Darvas, B. (eds), Contributions to a manual of Palaearctic/European Diptera. Science Herald; Budapest.
- Pape, T. 1996. Catalogue of the Sarcophagidae of the world (Insecta: Diptera).Memoirs of Entomology International 8: 1–558.
- Rohdendorf, B. B. Family Sarcophagidae in Bei-Bienko, G. Ya. Keys to the Insects of the European part of the USSR Fauna SSR (NS) 12: xv, 1–496. [In Russian; English translation 1988, pp. 1021–1096; Washington, D.C.]
- Rohdendorf, B. B., 1930-1975 Sarcophaginae, in Lindner, E. Fliegen die Palaearktischen Region. 11 64h, 1–232;1985, 64h. Sarcophaginae (Lieferung 330) 1–297;1993 64h. Sarcophaginae (Lieferung 331) 1–441, 90 Abbildungen (figures).
- Venturi, F., 1960. Sistematica e geonemia dei Sarcofagidi (escl. Sarcophaga s.l.) italiani (Diptera). Frustula Entomologica, 2 (7): 1–124.
- Verves, Yu.G., 1986. Family Sarcophagidae. In: Soós Á. & Papp L. (eds.), Catalogue of Palaearctic Diptera, 12. Akadémiai Kiadó, Budapest - Elsevier, Amsterdam: 58-193

== Catalogues ==
- Pape, T. 1996. Catalogue of the Sarcophagidae of the world (Insecta: Diptera). Memoirs of Entomology International 8: 1–558.
- Lehrer, A.Z., 2000, Le système taxonomique des Sarcophaginae afrotropicales (Diptera, Sarcophagidae). Entomologica, Bari, 34:41-63.
- Lehrer, A.Z., 2003, Sarcophaginae de l'Afrique (Insecta, Diptera, Sarcophagidae). Entomologica, Bari, 37:5-528.

=== Principal bibliographic sources ===
- Baranov, N. (1925), Neue Dipteren aus Serbien. – Let. Pol. Odl. Kontr. Sta. Topcideru, Belgrad, 1:1-11.
- Baranov, N. (1941), Zweiter Beitrag zur Kenntnis der Gattung Sarcophaga (s.l.). Vet. Arh., 11:361-404 [In Croatian and German].
- Becker, T. (1908), Dipteren der Kanarischen Inseln. Mitt. zool. Mus. Berlin, 4:1-180.
- Böttcher, G. (1912), Die männlichen Begattungswerkzeuge der Arten bei dem Genus Sarcophaga Meigen. und ihre Bedeutung für die Abgrenzung der Arten. Dtsch. ent. Z., 525–544, 705–736.
- Bôttcher, G. (1913), Die männlichen Begattungswerkzeuge der Arten bei dem Genus Sarcophaga Meigen. und ihre Bedeutung für die Abgrenzung der Arten. Dtsch. ent. Z., 1-16, 115–130, 239–254, 351–377.
- Brauer, F. & Bergenstamm, J.E., (1889), Die Zweiflügler des Keiserlichen zu Wien. IV. Vorarbeiten zu einer Monographie der Muscaria Schizometopa (exclusive Anthomyidae). Pars I. Denkschr. Akad. Wiss., Wien, 56:69-180.
- Brauer, F. & Bergenstamm, J.E., (1891), Die Zweiflügler des Keiserlichen zu Wien. V. Vorarbeiten zu einer Monographie der Muscaria Schizometopa (exclusive Anthomyidae). Pars II. Denkschr. Akad. Wiss., Wien, 58:39-446.
- Enderlein, G. (1928a), Klassification der Sarcophagiden. Sarcophagiden-Studien I. Arch. klassifik. phylogeny. Ent., 1:1-56.
- Enderlein, G. (1928b), Sarcophgiden-Studien II. Konowia, 7:147-153.
- Enderlein, G. (1936), 22. Ordnung: Zweiflügler, Diptera. Die Tierwelt Mitteleuropas. Vol. 6, Insekten, Teil III, Abt. 16:1-259.
- Fan, Zi-De (1965), Key to the common synanthropic flies of China. Academy of Sciences, Peking, XV + 1–330.
- Fan Zi-De (ed.), 1992, Key to the common flies of China. Second Edition. Shanghai Institute of Entomology, Academia Sinica. 992p + 40 pl.
- Kano, R., Flield, G. & Shinonaga, S. (1967), Sarcophagidae (Insecta: Diptera). Fauna Japonica 7:1-168 + 41 pls.
- Lehrer, A.Z., (1974), Diptères myiasigènes de la superfamille Sarcophagidea de Roumanie. Acta Rer. Nat. Mus. Nat. Slov., Bratislava, 20:125-159.
- Lehrer, A.Z., (2000a). Le système taxonomique des Sarcophaginae afrotropicales (Diptera, Sarcophagidae). Entomologica, Bari, 34:41-63.
- Lehrer, A.Z. (2000b), La structure de l’abdomen des Sarcophaginae (Diptera, Sarcophagidae). Entomologica, Bari, 34:153-169.
- Lehrer, A.Z., (2003a), Revision du genre Wohlfahrtia Brauer & Bergenstamm, 1889 de la faune d’Israël (Diptera, Sarcophagidae). Entomol. Croat., 7, nr. 1-2: 15–33.
- Lehrer, A.Z., (2003b), Sarcophaginae de l’Afrique (Insecta, Diptera, Sarcophagidae). Entomologica, Bari, 37 :5-528.
- Lehrer, A.Z., (2005), Nouveaux Sarcophagides afrotropicaux et orientaux (Diptera, Sarcophagidae). Entomologica, Bari, 39,:5-59.
- Lehrer, A.Z., 2006, Sarcophaginae et Paramacronychiinae du Proche Orient (Insecta, Diptera, Sarcophagidae). Pensoft, 1–263.
- Lehrer, A.Z., 2008, Le statut taxonomique des espèces "Musca carnaria Linnaeus, 1758" et Sarcophaga carnaria Bottcher, 1912 (Diptera, (Diptera, Sarcophagidae). Fragmenta Dipterologica, 13:15-17 .
- Lehrer, A.Z., 2010, Taxonomic Atlas of the postabdominal structures. SARCOPHAGIDAE (Insecta, Diptera), vol. 1, Entomologica, Bari, 42 : 3–459, 418 figs.
- Lehrer, A. Z. & Fromunda V., 1986, Le développement larvaire du diptèremyiasigène Wohlfahrtia magnifica (Schiner) (Diptera, Sarcophagidae). Bull. Ann. Soc. r. bege Ent., 122:129-136
- Lehrer A., Lehrer M. & Verstraeten C., 1988, Les myiases causées aux moutons de Roumanie par Wohlfahrtia magnifica (Schiner) (Diptera, Sarcophagidae). Ann. Méd. Vét., 132:475-481.
- Lehrer, A. Z. & Luciano P., 1980, Sarcophagides (Diptera) parasites de Porthetria dispar (L.) en Sardaigne et leur cartographie dans le reseau U.T.M. Studi Sassaresi, Sez. III, Ann. Fac. Agraria Univ. Sassari, 27:161- 173.
- Lehrer, A. Z. & Verstraeten C., 1991, Expansion parasitologique et géographique de Wohlfahrtia magnifica (Schiner) (Diptera, Sarcophagidae) en Roumanie. Bull. Rech. Agron. Gembloux, 26(4):563-567.
- Leonide, J. & Leonide J.-C. (1986), Les diptères sarcophagidés des orthoptères français – essai biotaxonomie. Université de Provence (Aix-en-Provence), 1–301.
- Meigen, J.W. (1826), Systematische Beschreibung der bekannten europäischen zweiflügeligen Insekte. Fünfter Teil, Schulz, Hamm., 1–412. Mihàlyi, F. (1975), Beschreibung vier neuer Sarcophagidae Arten aus Ungarn (Diptera), Acta zool. hung., 21:101-108.
- Mihàlyi, F., (1979b), Fémeslefgyek - Húslegyek. Calliphoridae – Sarcophagidae. Fauna Hung., 135:1-152.
- Pape, T. (1987), The Sarcophagidae (Diptera) of Fennoscandia and Denmark. Fauna ent. scand., 19:1-203.
- Pape, T., 1996, Catalogue of the Sarcophagidae of the World (Insecta:Diptera). Mem. on Entomology, Intern., vol. 8, 558 p.
- Povolny D. & Verves, YU.G. (1997), The flesh-flies of Central Europa (Insecta, Diptera, Sarcophagidae). Spixiana. Supplement, München, 24 :1-260.
- Rohdendorf, B.B. (1937), Fam. Sarcophagidae. (P. 1). Faune de l'URSS, 19:1-501 [In Russian with German summary].
- Salem, H.H. (1935), The Egyptian species of the genus Sarcophaga. Publ. Egypt. Univ. Fac. Med., 5:1-61.
- Seguy, E. (1941), Études sur les mouches parasites. 2. Calliphoridae, calliphorines (suite), sarcophagines et rhinophorines de l'Europe occidentale et méridionale, Encycl. ent. (Ser. A), 21:1-436.
- Senior-White, R.A., Aubertin, D. & Smart, J. (1940), Diptera. Family Calliphoridae. The fauna of British India, including the remainder of the Oriental Region. Vol. VI. London, 1–288.
- Thompson, F.C. & Pont, A.C., 1993, Systematic Database of Musca Names (Diptera). These Zoologicae, 20, 221 p.
- Verves, YU. G. (1982), 64h. Sarcophaginae. Die Fliegen der plaearktischen Region, Stuttgart, Bd. 11, Lf. 327:235-296.
- Verves, YU. G. (1985), 64h. Sarcophaginae. Die Fliegen der plaearktischen Region, Stuttgart, Bd. 11, Lf. 330:297-440.
- Zumpt, F. (1972), Calliphoridae (Diptera Cyclorhapha). Part IV. Sarcophaginae. Explor. Parc nat. Albert, Miss. G.F. de Witte (1933-1935), 101:1-264.

== See also ==
- List of parasites of humans

== Species lists ==
- Nearctic
- Australian/Oceanian
- Palaearctic
- Japan
