= List of Sarcophaga species =

This is a list of 1013 species in 184 subgenera of the genus Sarcophaga, common flesh flies. (Catalogue of Life and Systema Dipterorum, 2024.)

== Sarcophaga species ==
Genus Sarcophaga Meigen, 1824
Subgenus Aethianella Zumpt, 1972
Sarcophaga edwardsiana (Zumpt, 1972)
Subgenus Aethiopisca Rohdendorf, 1963
Sarcophaga currani (Verves, 1989)
Subgenus Afropierretia Verves, 1997
Sarcophaga dingaani Zumpt, 1950
Subgenus Afrosarcophaga
Sarcophaga booersiana Engel, 1925
Subgenus Afrothyrsocnema Rohdendorf, 1963
Sarcophaga adusta Engel, 1938
Sarcophaga castellana Zumpt, 1972
Sarcophaga demeilloni Zumpt, 1950
Sarcophaga globicauda Rohdendorf, 1931
Sarcophaga ingwavumae Zumpt, 1972
Sarcophaga montivaga Zumpt, 1961
Sarcophaga sakharovae (Verves, 1985)
Sarcophaga seychellica (Verves, 1986)
Sarcophaga subdistinguenda Zumpt, 1950
Sarcophaga vansoni Zumpt, 1950
Sarcophaga zuluensis Zumpt, 1950
Subgenus Alisarcophaga Fan & Chen, 1981
Sarcophaga gressitti Hall & Bohart, 1948 - (Flesh fly)
Sarcophaga sawainensis (Nandi, 1989)
Subgenus Amamia
Sarcophaga kanekoi (Kano & Field, 1964)
Subgenus Amharomyia
Sarcophaga maculigaster Verves, 1984
Sarcophaga tavanola (Lehrer, 2013)
Subgenus Anthostilophalla Lehrer, 1993
Sarcophaga klinzigi Lehrer, 1993
Sarcophaga menelika (Lehrer, 2005)
Sarcophaga pennopluma Zumpt, 1972
Subgenus Arachnidomyia
Sarcophaga davidsonii Coquillett, 1892
Sarcophaga lindae (Lopes, 1990)
Sarcophaga travassosi (Tibana & Mello, 1992)
Subgenus Asceloctella Enderlein, 1928
Sarcophaga australis (Johnston & Tiegs, 1921)
Subgenus Asiopierettia
Subgenus Asiopierretia Rohdendorf, 1965
Sarcophaga kayaensis Park, 1962
Sarcophaga ugamskii (Rohdendorf, 1937)
Subgenus Baliisca Verves, 1980
Sarcophaga souzalopesi Pape, 1996
Subgenus Baranovisca Lopes, 1985
Sarcophaga arachnivora (Lopes, 1985)
Sarcophaga banksi Senior-White, 1924
Sarcophaga cantrelli (Verves, 1992)
Sarcophaga cyrtophorae (Cantrell, 1986)
Sarcophaga praelibera (Lopes, 1959)
Sarcophaga reposita (Lopes, 1959)
Subgenus Batissophalla Rohdendorf, 1963
Sarcophaga batissa Curran, 1934
Sarcophaga galaniella (Lehrer, 2009)
Sarcophaga siganella (Lehrer, 2005)
Sarcophaga uamensis Zumpt, 1951
Subgenus Bellieriomima Rohdendorf, 1937
Sarcophaga baoxingensis (Feng & Ye, 1987)
Sarcophaga diminuta Thomas, 1949
Sarcophaga genuforceps Thomas, 1949
Sarcophaga graciliforceps Thomas, 1949
Sarcophaga horii Kano, 1953
Sarcophaga josephi Böttcher, 1912
Sarcophaga kagaensis Hori, 1954
Sarcophaga lini Sugiyama, 1987
Sarcophaga noonganensis Shinonaga, 2004
Sarcophaga pseudosubulata (Kano & Field, 1963)
Sarcophaga pterygota Thomas, 1949
Sarcophaga shuxia (Feng & Qiao, 2003)
Sarcophaga situliformis (Zhong, Wu & Fan, 1981)
Sarcophaga spatuliformis (Ye, 1980)
Sarcophaga stackelbergi (Rohdendorf, 1937)
Sarcophaga subulata Pandellé, 1896
Sarcophaga takahasii Kano & Okazaki, 1956
Sarcophaga tenuicornis (Rohdendorf, 1937)
Sarcophaga uniseta Baranov, 1939
Sarcophaga yaanensis (Feng, 1986)
Sarcophaga zhouquensis (Ye & Liu, 1981)
Subgenus Bercaea Robineau-Desvoidy, 1863
Sarcophaga africa (Wiedemann, 1824) - (Flesh fly)
Sarcophaga arno Curran, 1934
Sarcophaga burungae Curran, 1934
Sarcophaga inaequalis Austen, 1909
Sarcophaga parasurcoufi Zumpt, 1972
Subgenus Bercaeopsis Townsend, 1917
Sarcophaga acadiana Reinhard, 1947
Sarcophaga acrophila (Dodge, 1956)
Sarcophaga beameri (Dodge, 1956)
Sarcophaga bicolor (Dodge, 1956)
Sarcophaga carinata (Dodge, 1956)
Sarcophaga elanis Reinhard, 1947
Sarcophaga epitheca Reinhard, 1952
Sarcophaga fattigi (Dodge, 1956)
Sarcophaga footei Dodge, 1964
Sarcophaga fortisa Reinhard, 1947
Sarcophaga helicivora (Dodge, 1956)
Sarcophaga hesterna Reinhard, 1947
Sarcophaga idonea Aldrich, 1916
Sarcophaga louisianensis (Dodge, 1956)
Sarcophaga mimoris Reinhard, 1947
Sarcophaga morosa Aldrich, 1925
Sarcophaga ontariensis Hall, 1932
Sarcophaga parallela Aldrich, 1916
Sarcophaga paulina Hall, 1937
Sarcophaga pleomenda Reinhard, 1953
Sarcophaga pratti (Dodge, 1956)
Sarcophaga rabunensis (Dodge, 1956)
Sarcophaga sabroskyi (Dodge, 1956)
Sarcophaga sarraceniae Riley, 1874
Sarcophaga seagoi (Dodge, 1956)
Sarcophaga sima Aldrich, 1916
Sarcophaga smithi (Dodge, 1956)
Sarcophaga snyderi (Dodge, 1956)
Sarcophaga sudiai (Dodge, 1956)
Sarcophaga sutilis Reinhard, 1952
Sarcophaga tarsata Aldrich, 1916
Sarcophaga tetona Reinhard, 1952
Sarcophaga tetra Aldrich, 1916
Subgenus Beziella Enderlein, 1937
Sarcophaga alina Curran, 1934
Sarcophaga batissoides Zumpt, 1972
Sarcophaga erecta Engel, 1925
Sarcophaga freedmani Zumpt, 1956
Sarcophaga kadeisi Salem, 1938
Sarcophaga mefouensis Rickenbach, 1977
Sarcophaga pomeroyi Zumpt, 1962
Sarcophaga pudongensis (Fan, Chen & Lu, 2003)
Sarcophaga rageaui Rickenbach, 1966
Sarcophaga shenzhenensis (Fan, 2002)
Sarcophaga spangleri Reed, 1973
Sarcophaga stygia Zumpt, 1951
Sarcophaga vicaria Curran, 1934
Subgenus Bilenemyia Verves, 1989
Sarcophaga limpopoensis Zumpt, 1956
Subgenus Boettcherella
Sarcophaga galmuda (Lehrer, 1998)
Subgenus Boettcherisca Rohdendorf, 1937
Sarcophaga cabrerai (Kano & Sugiyama, 1983)
Sarcophaga formosensis (Kirner & Lopes, 1961)
Sarcophaga highlandica (Kurahashi & Tan, 2009)
Sarcophaga invaria Walker, 1859
Sarcophaga javanica (Lopes, 1961)
Sarcophaga karnyi Hardy, 1927
Sarcophaga koimani (Kano & Shinonaga, 1977)
Sarcophaga krathonmai Pape & Bänziger, 2000
Sarcophaga nathani (Lopes, 1961)
Sarcophaga peregrina (Robineau-Desvoidy, 1830) - (Flesh fly)
Sarcophaga septentrionalis (Rohdendorf, 1937)
Sarcophaga talomoensis Magpayo & Kano, 1986
Sarcophaga timorensis (Kano & Shinonaga, 1977)
Sarcophaga zuli (Kurahashi, Tan & Leh, 2015)
Subgenus Brasia Strand, 1932
Sarcophaga yadvashemia (Lehrer, 1996)
Subgenus Bulbostyla Giroux & Wheeler, 2010
Sarcophaga airosalis Giroux & Wheeler, 2010
Sarcophaga cadyi Giroux & Wheeler, 2010
Sarcophaga cuautla Giroux & Wheeler, 2010
Sarcophaga fattigina Giroux & Wheeler, 2010
Sarcophaga ironalis Giroux & Wheeler, 2010
Subgenus Caledonicesa Koçak & Kemal, 2010
Subgenus Callostuckenbergia Lehrer & Lehrer, 1992
Subgenus Ceratophalla
Subgenus Cercosarcophaga Zumpt, 1972
Sarcophaga preussi Zumpt, 1951
Sarcophaga swahilia (Lehrer, 2009)
Subgenus Chaetophalla Rohdendorf, 1963
Sarcophaga villa Curran, 1934
Subgenus Chrysosarcophaga Townsend, 1933
Sarcophaga superba (Townsend, 1933)
Subgenus Cornexcisia Fan & Kano, 2000
Sarcophaga cygnocerca (Xue, Verves & Du, 2011)
Sarcophaga longicornuta (Fan & Kano, 2000)
Sarcophaga suthep Pape & Bänziger, 2003
Subgenus Curranea
Sarcophaga tibialis Macquart, 1851
Subgenus Curranisca Rohdendorf, 1963
Sarcophaga reedi (Lehrer, 2005)
Subgenus Curtophalla Lehrer, 1994
Sarcophaga geari Zumpt, 1972
Subgenus Cyclophalla Rohdendorf, 1963
Sarcophaga basuto Zumpt, 1951
Subgenus Danbeckia Lehrer, 1994
Sarcophaga paralina Zumpt, 1967
Subgenus Dasysceloctis Enderlein, 1928
Sarcophaga longanota (Lehrer, 2005)
Sarcophaga maculipennis (Enderlein, 1928)
Subgenus Deconinckia Lehrer, 2003
Subgenus Dinemomyia Chen, 1975
Sarcophaga nigribasicosta (Chen, 1975)
Subgenus Diplonophalla Lehrer, 1994
Sarcophaga hautieri (Lehrer, 2003)
Sarcophaga weyeri Zumpt, 1972
Subgenus Dolichophalla Rohdendorf, 1963
Sarcophaga marcadita (Lehrer, 2013)
Sarcophaga sudanica Zumpt, 1951
Subgenus Dovporiella Lehrer, 2003
Sarcophaga curva Reed, 1974
Subgenus Draculana Lehrer, 2002
Sarcophaga momba Curran, 1934
Subgenus Dravidia Lehrer, 2010
Sarcophaga cavangarei (Nandi, 1988)
Subgenus Durbanella Lehrer, 1994
Sarcophaga vockerothi (Lehrer, 1994)
Subgenus Fanimyia Verves, 1997
Sarcophaga globovesica (Ye, 1980)
Subgenus Fanzidella Lehrer, 2003
Sarcophaga erzulia (Lehrer, 2013)
Sarcophaga furcadorsalis Rohdendorf, 1931
Subgenus Fengia Rohdendorf, 1964
Sarcophaga kaimaraensis (Nandi, 1992)
Sarcophaga ostindicae Senior-White, 1924
Subgenus Fergusonimyia Lopes, 1958
Sarcophaga bancroftorum Johnston & Tiegs, 1921
Subgenus Fijimyia Lopes & Kano, 1971
Sarcophaga ganura Bezzi, 1927
Sarcophaga tephrura Bezzi, 1927
Subgenus Grimaldiomyia
Sarcophaga gnu Curran, 1934
Subgenus Gujaratophalla
Sarcophaga girnarensis (Nandi, 1992)
Subgenus Hadashophalla
Sarcophaga tautella (Lehrer, 1996)
Subgenus Hadroxena Whitmore, Buenaventure & Pape, 2018
Sarcophaga karakoncolos Whitmore, Buenaventura & Pape, 2018
Subgenus Hardyella Lopes, 1959
Sarcophaga littoralis Johnston & Tiegs, 1922
Subgenus Harpagophalla Rohdendorf, 1937
Sarcophaga kempi Senior-White, 1924
Sarcophaga talonata Senior-White, 1925
Subgenus Harpagophylloides
Sarcophaga opata Zumpt, 1972
Sarcophaga theseus Zumpt, 1951
Subgenus Helicophagella Enderlein, 1928
Sarcophaga agnata Rondani, 1861
Sarcophaga altitudinis Sugiyama, 1989
Sarcophaga bellae (Lehrer, 2000)
Sarcophaga bodenheimeri (Lehrer, 2001)
Sarcophaga carlestolrai Pape, 2023
Sarcophaga crassimargo Pandellé, 1896
Sarcophaga dreyfusi (Lehrer, 1994)
Sarcophaga gorodkovi (Grunin, 1964)
Sarcophaga hirticrus Pandellé, 1896
Sarcophaga hortobagyensis (Mihályi, 1979)
Sarcophaga inopinata (Rohdendorf, 1937)
Sarcophaga keresophalla (Lehrer, 2001)
Sarcophaga macrura (Rohdendorf, 1937)
Sarcophaga maculata Meigen, 1835
Sarcophaga melanura Meigen, 1826
Sarcophaga mishnania (Lehrer, 2001)
Sarcophaga novella Baranov, 1929
Sarcophaga noverca Rondani, 1861
Sarcophaga novercoides Böttcher, 1913
Sarcophaga okaliana (Lehrer, 1975)
Sarcophaga ora Blackith, Blackith & Pape, 1997
Sarcophaga pachyura (Rohdendorf, 1937)
Sarcophaga reicostae (Povolný, 1999)
Sarcophaga rosellei Böttcher, 1912
Sarcophaga sarezia (Lehrer, 2006)
Subgenus Heteronychia Brauer & Bergenstamm, 1889
Sarcophaga abramovi (Rohdendorf, 1938)
Sarcophaga amita Rondani, 1861
Sarcophaga amputata Pape, 1990
Sarcophaga anatolica Whitmore, 2011
Sarcophaga ancilla Rondani, 1865
Sarcophaga ancilloides Baranov, 1927
Sarcophaga angelicae Engel, 1925
Sarcophaga arcipes Pandellé, 1896
Sarcophaga ardua (Peris, González-Mora & Mingo-Pérez, 1996)
Sarcophaga armenica (Rohdendorf, 1937)
Sarcophaga atavina (Enderlein, 1928)
Sarcophaga autochtona (Verves, 2020)
Sarcophaga bajkalensis Rohdendorf, 1925
Sarcophaga balanina Pandellé, 1896
Sarcophaga belanovskyi (Verves, 1973)
Sarcophaga benaci Böttcher, 1913
Sarcophaga bezziana Böttcher, 1913
Sarcophaga boettcheri Villeneuve, 1912
Sarcophaga bulgarica (Enderlein, 1936)
Sarcophaga chaetoneura (Brauer & Bergenstamm, 1889)
Sarcophaga chapini Curran, 1934
Sarcophaga chiquita (Peris, González-Mora & Mingo-Pérez, 1998)
Sarcophaga clarahenae (Lehrer, 1999)
Sarcophaga consanguinea Rondani, 1861
Sarcophaga croca Pape, 1996
Sarcophaga cucullans Pandellé, 1896
Sarcophaga curvifemoralis (Li, 1980)
Sarcophaga depressifrons Zetterstedt, 1845
Sarcophaga desertorum Salem, 1935
Sarcophaga dissimilis Meigen, 1826
Sarcophaga enderleini Jacentkovský, 1937
Sarcophaga esthera (Lehrer, 2006)
Sarcophaga evagorata Zumpt, 1956
Sarcophaga ferox Villeneuve, 1908
Sarcophaga filia Rondani, 1861
Sarcophaga filiola (Rohdendorf, 1937)
Sarcophaga gabrielei Whitmore, 2009
Sarcophaga gallica Whitmore, Richet, Pape & Blackith, 2009
Sarcophaga giganta Pape, 1996
Sarcophaga gomezbustilloi (Lehrer & Báez, 1986)
Sarcophaga graeca (Rohdendorf, 1937)
Sarcophaga grenieri Rickenbach, 1965
Sarcophaga guoi (Wei & Yang, 2005)
Sarcophaga haemorrhoa Meigen, 1826
Sarcophaga haemorrhoides Böttcher, 1913
Sarcophaga helenae (Trofimov, 1948)
Sarcophaga hellenica Whitmore, 2011
Sarcophaga heptapotamica (Rohdendorf, 1937)
Sarcophaga infixa Böttcher, 1913
Sarcophaga javita (Peris, González-Mora & Mingo-Pérez, 1998)
Sarcophaga kaplani Lehrer, 1999
Sarcophaga kataphygionis (Povolný, 1999)
Sarcophaga kerteszi Villeneuve, 1912
Sarcophaga kobachidzei (Guzhabidze, 1965)
Sarcophaga kovalae (Verves, 1979)
Sarcophaga kozlovi (Rohdendorf, 1937)
Sarcophaga kunonis (Pape, 1986)
Sarcophaga lacrymans Villeneuve, 1912
Sarcophaga langestylata Lehrer, 2013
Sarcophaga lederbergi (Lehrer, 1995)
Sarcophaga lejlekensis Whitmore, 2011
Sarcophaga limbata (Reed, 1973)
Sarcophaga longestilatus Lehrer, 2013
Sarcophaga longestylata Strobl, 1906
Sarcophaga macromembrana (Ye, 1980)
Sarcophaga maritima Povolný, 1994
Sarcophaga markevitshi (Verves, 1975)
Sarcophaga mazurmovitshi (Verves, 1979)
Sarcophaga mcgoughi (Zumpt, 1972)
Sarcophaga mediterranea Whitmore, 2011
Sarcophaga metopina Villeneuve, 1908
Sarcophaga minima Rondani, 1862
Sarcophaga monspellensia Böttcher, 1913
Sarcophaga morenita (Peris, González-Mora & Mingo-Pérez, 1998)
Sarcophaga moronita (Peris, González-Mora & Mingo-Pérez, 1998)
Sarcophaga mossambica Zumpt, 1951
Sarcophaga mousseti Lehrer, 1976
Sarcophaga mutila Villeneuve, 1912
Sarcophaga nanula (Povolný, 1999)
Sarcophaga nigracauda (Verves & Khrokalo, 2020)
Sarcophaga nigricaudata (Povolný & Slamečková, 1982)
Sarcophaga nipponensis (Shinonaga & Matsudaira, 1970)
Sarcophaga nostalgica (Lehrer, 2000)
Sarcophaga oastensacken (Lehrer, 2012)
Sarcophaga obvia (Povolný, 2004)
Sarcophaga ostensacken (Lehrer, 2012)
Sarcophaga pandellei (Rohdendorf, 1937)
Sarcophaga pauciseta Pandellé, 1896
Sarcophaga penicillata Villeneuve, 1907
Sarcophaga petrovae (Artamonov, 1980)
Sarcophaga plotnikovi Rohdendorf, 1925
Sarcophaga pontica (Rohdendorf, 1937)
Sarcophaga porrecta Böttcher, 1913
Sarcophaga proxima Rondani, 1861
Sarcophaga pseudobenaci (Baranov, 1942)
Sarcophaga pumila Meigen, 1826
Sarcophaga quinquestrigata (Enderlein, 1934)
Sarcophaga recta (Rohdendorf, 1937)
Sarcophaga rondaniana (Rohdendorf, 1937)
Sarcophaga rosellensis Whitmore, 2011
Sarcophaga salerensis (Lehrer, 1978)
Sarcophaga santospintosi (Lehrer & Báez, 1986)
Sarcophaga schineri Bezzi, 1891
Sarcophaga schnabli Villeneuve, 1911
Sarcophaga setinervis Rondani, 1861
Sarcophaga shnitnikovi (Rohdendorf, 1937)
Sarcophaga sicilia Pape, 1996
Sarcophaga siciliana (Enderlein, 1928)
Sarcophaga siciliensis Böttcher, 1913
Sarcophaga slovaca (Povolný & Slamečková, 1967)
Sarcophaga smirnovi Rohdendorf, 1925
Sarcophaga strenua (Robineau-Desvoidy, 1863)
Sarcophaga tangerensis Whitmore, 2011
Sarcophaga telengai (Verves, 1973)
Sarcophaga tetrix Whitmore, 2011
Sarcophaga thirionae (Lehrer, 1976)
Sarcophaga tricolor Villeneuve, 1908
Sarcophaga tsinanensis (Fan, 1964)
Sarcophaga tunisiae Whitmore, 2011
Sarcophaga turana (Rohdendorf, 1937)
Sarcophaga uncicurva Pandellé, 1896
Sarcophaga vagans Meigen, 1826
Sarcophaga vicina Macquart, 1835
Sarcophaga villeneuveana (Enderlein, 1928)
Sarcophaga violovitshi (Rohdendorf & Verves, 1979)
Sarcophaga wahisi (Lehrer, 1976)
Subgenus Hoa Rohdendorf, 1937
Sarcophaga flexuosa Ho, 1934
Sarcophaga membranijuxta Wang, Hue, Zhang & Pape, 2020
Subgenus Hochiella Lehrer, 2005
Sarcophaga pongola (Lehrer, 2005)
Subgenus Horiisca Rohdendorf, 1965
Sarcophaga hozawai Hori, 1954
Subgenus Hosarcophaga Shinonaga & Tumrasvin, 1979
Sarcophaga serrata Ho, 1938
Subgenus Hyperacanthisca Rohdendorf, 1963
Sarcophaga bellowi (Lehrer, 1996)
Sarcophaga susteriana (Lehrer, 2003)
Sarcophaga zumpti Engel, 1938
Subgenus Ihosyia Verves, 1989
Sarcophaga nomita Zumpt, 1964
Subgenus Iranihindia Rohdendorf, 1961
Sarcophaga futilis Senior-White, 1924
Sarcophaga jamesi (Nandi, 1979)
Sarcophaga martellata Senior-White, 1924
Sarcophaga martellatoides Baranov, 1931
Sarcophaga nepalensis (Kano & Shinonaga, 1969)
Sarcophaga persica (Rohdendorf, 1961)
Sarcophaga zaitzevi (Verves, 1989)
Subgenus Johnsonimima Kano & Lopes, 1971
Sarcophaga aurora Pape, 1996
Sarcophaga bivittata (Kano & Lopes, 1971)
Subgenus Johnstonimyia Lopes, 1959
Sarcophaga fatua (Lopes, 1967)
Sarcophaga gorokaensis Sugiyama, Shinonaga & Kano, 1988
Sarcophaga kappa Johnston & Tiegs, 1921
Sarcophaga lincta (Lopes, 1959)
Subgenus Kalshovenella Baranov, 1941
Sarcophaga otiophalla (Fan & Chen, 1981)
Subgenus Kanoa Rohdendorf, 1965
Sarcophaga okazakii Kano, 1953
Subgenus Kanomyia Shinonaga & Tumrasvin, 1979
Sarcophaga bangkokensis (Shinonaga & Tumrasvin, 1979)
Subgenus Karnataka
Subgenus Kenyophga
Sarcophaga klinzigiana (Lehrer, 2005)
Subgenus Komisca Kurahashi & Samerjai, 2018
Sarcophaga nanensis Chaiwong, Sukontason & Sukontason, 2009
Subgenus Kozlovea Rohdendorf, 1937
Sarcophaga cetu (Chao & Chan, 1978)
Sarcophaga lothianensis (Sinha & Nandi, 2002)
Sarcophaga peshelicis Senior-White, 1930
Sarcophaga tshernovi (Rohdendorf, 1937)
Subgenus Kramerea Rohdendorf, 1937
Sarcophaga schuetzei Kramer, 1909
Subgenus Kramerella
Sarcophaga slameckovae (Lehrer, 1976)
Subgenus Krameromyia Verves, 1982
Sarcophaga anaces Walker, 1849
Sarcophaga sirinia (Lehrer, 2008)
Subgenus Latistyla Strukan, 1970
Sarcophaga czernyi Böttcher, 1912
Subgenus Lehreria
Sarcophaga keiseri Zumpt, 1964
Subgenus Leucomyia Brauer & Bergenstamm, 1891
Sarcophaga alba (Schiner, 1868)
Sarcophaga dukoicus (Zhang & Chao, 1988)
Subgenus Lioplacella Enderlein, 1928
Sarcophaga mauritana Zumpt, 1953
Subgenus Lioproctia Enderlein, 1928
Sarcophaga alcicornis Hardy, 1932
Sarcophaga annandalei Senior-White, 1924
Sarcophaga aurescens (Lopes, 1967)
Sarcophaga basiseta Baranov, 1931
Sarcophaga beesoni Senior-White, 1924
Sarcophaga imita Pape, 1996
Sarcophaga mailansis Mumar, Bala & Abd Al Galil, 2023
Sarcophaga midnaporensis (Nandi, 1978)
Sarcophaga multicolor Johnston & Tiegs, 1922
Sarcophaga notabilis (Kano & Lopes, 1969)
Sarcophaga paineiana (Baranov, 1934)
Sarcophaga prosballiina Baranov, 1931
Sarcophaga spinifera Hardy, 1932
Sarcophaga sumbaensis Shinonaga, 2004
Sarcophaga taiwanensis (Kano & Lopes, 1969)
Sarcophaga torvida (Lopes, 1959)
Subgenus Liopygia Enderlein, 1928
Sarcophaga argyrostoma (Robineau-Desvoidy, 1830) - (Flesh fly)
Sarcophaga crassipalpis Macquart, 1839
Sarcophaga cultellata Pandellé, 1896
Sarcophaga flavibarbis Engel, 1925
Sarcophaga par Zumpt, 1954
Sarcophaga ruficornis (Fabricius, 1794) - (Flesh fly)
Sarcophaga sabiensis Zumpt, 1953
Sarcophaga santosdiasi Zumpt, 1951
Sarcophaga surcoufi Villeneuve, 1913
Subgenus Liopygiopsis Verves, 1997
Sarcophaga juliaetta Aldrich, 1916
Subgenus Liosarcophaga Enderlein, 1928
Sarcophaga adhamae (Lehrer & Abou-Zied, 2008)
Sarcophaga adzharica (Rohdendorf, 1937)
Sarcophaga aegyptica Salem, 1935
Sarcophaga allisoni Sugiyama, Shinonaga & Kano, 1988
Sarcophaga amplicercus (Shinonaga & Tumrasvin, 1979)
Sarcophaga angarosinica (Rohdendorf, 1937)
Sarcophaga auricauda Ho, 1938
Sarcophaga bartaki (Verves, Radchenko & Khrokalo, 2017)
Sarcophaga bechuanae Zumpt, 1972
Sarcophaga brevicornis Ho, 1934
Sarcophaga bushmenia (Lehrer, 2005)
Sarcophaga catalunya (Lehrer, 2008)
Sarcophaga choudhuryi Sinha & Nandi, 2002
Sarcophaga cognata (Robineau-Desvoidy, 1830)
Sarcophaga dahiana (Lehrer, 2013)
Sarcophaga darshania (Lehrer, 2008)
Sarcophaga deviedmai (Lehrer & Báez, 1986)
Sarcophaga dux Thomson, 1869 - (Flesh fly)
Sarcophaga edrossi (Lehrer, 2009)
Sarcophaga emdeni (Rohdendorf, 1969)
Sarcophaga emmrichiana (Lehrer, 2002)
Sarcophaga eta Johnston & Tiegs, 1921
Sarcophaga evelynae Zumpt, 1964
Sarcophaga evenhuisi (Lehrer, 2005)
Sarcophaga exuberans Pandellé, 1896
Sarcophaga feralis Pape, 1996
Sarcophaga fimbricauda (Verves & Xue, 2016)
Sarcophaga forceps Blackith & Blackith, 1988
Sarcophaga gallinara (Lehrer, 2013)
Sarcophaga gambiensis Zumpt, 1972
Sarcophaga garbo Curran, 1934
Sarcophaga goodhopeia (Lehrer, 2005)
Sarcophaga hamoni Rickenbach, 1965
Sarcophaga harpax Pandellé, 1896
Sarcophaga hinglungensis (Fan, 1964)
Sarcophaga hunti (Lehrer, 1996)
Sarcophaga idmais Séguy, 1934
Sarcophaga inhacaensis Zumpt, 1972
Sarcophaga inzi Curran, 1934
Sarcophaga inzoides Zumpt, 1972
Sarcophaga jacobi (Lehrer, 1994)
Sarcophaga jacobsoni (Rohdendorf, 1937)
Sarcophaga jaipurensis (Nandi, 1990)
Sarcophaga jaroschevskyi (Rohdendorf, 1937)
Sarcophaga josephi (Nandi, 2002)
Sarcophaga juncta (Lopes, 1967)
Sarcophaga kanoi Park, 1962
Sarcophaga kanoiana (Lehrer, 1994)
Sarcophaga kirgizica (Rohdendorf, 1969)
Sarcophaga kitaharai Miyazaki, 1958
Sarcophaga kobayashii Hori, 1954
Sarcophaga kohla Johnston & Hardy, 1923
Sarcophaga kovatschevitchi (Strukan, 1970)
Sarcophaga liui (Ye & Zhang, 1989)
Sarcophaga liukiuensis (Fan, 1964)
Sarcophaga londtiana (Lehrer, 1996)
Sarcophaga luabae Zumpt, 1972
Sarcophaga luzonensis Parker, 1919
Sarcophaga lypai (Verves, 1977)
Sarcophaga mababiensis Zumpt, 1972
Sarcophaga madeirensis (Schiner, 1868)
Sarcophaga marcosgarciae (Lehrer & Martínez-Sánchez, 2000)
Sarcophaga maritima Engel, 1925
Sarcophaga marshalli Parker, 1923
Sarcophaga masaiana (Lehrer, 2005)
Sarcophaga mazuella (Lehrer & Wei, 2011)
Sarcophaga monodia (Lehrer, 2006)
Sarcophaga monospila (Bezzi, 1908)
Sarcophaga monserrati (Peris, González-Mora & Mingo-Pérez, 1999)
Sarcophaga moucheti Rickenbach, 1977
Sarcophaga mulaba Curran, 1934
Sarcophaga namibia Reed, 1974
Sarcophaga nanpingensis (Ye, 1980)
Sarcophaga natalensis Zumpt, 1951
Sarcophaga neuweileri (Lehrer, 2002)
Sarcophaga nodosa Engel, 1925
Sarcophaga nubica Jaennicke, 1867
Sarcophaga palestinensis (Lehrer, 1998)
Sarcophaga paramulaba Zumpt, 1972
Sarcophaga phallosoma Zumpt, 1972
Sarcophaga pharaonis Rohdendorf, 1934
Sarcophaga pleskei (Rohdendorf, 1937)
Sarcophaga portschinskyi (Rohdendorf, 1937)
Sarcophaga promiscua (Lopes, 1967)
Sarcophaga pyrrhopoda Bezzi, 1923
Sarcophaga redux Walker, 1849
Sarcophaga rohdendorfi Salem, 1936
Sarcophaga sabae (Lehrer, 1995)
Sarcophaga salemiana (Lehrer, 1995)
Sarcophaga salkhit Pape, 1996
Sarcophaga sarracenioides Aldrich, 1916
Sarcophaga sarupi (Nandi, 1979)
Sarcophaga sayersi Salem, 1946
Sarcophaga semimarginalis Hall, 1931
Sarcophaga shermani Parker, 1923
Sarcophaga shimbana (Lehrer, 2006)
Sarcophaga shiritakaensis Hori, 1954
Sarcophaga shoniella (Lehrer, 2005)
Sarcophaga sigma Johnston & Tiegs, 1921
Sarcophaga simulatrix (Povolný, 2000)
Sarcophaga solomonica (Verves, 1982)
Sarcophaga spilargyra Bezzi, 1923
Sarcophaga sternalis (Reinhard, 1939)
Sarcophaga strumiana (Lehrer, 1996)
Sarcophaga subdiscalis Aldrich, 1916
Sarcophaga subharpax (Rohdendorf, 1969)
Sarcophaga sympaestria Zumpt, 1964
Sarcophaga teretirostris Pandellé, 1896
Sarcophaga tritriva (Lehrer, 2008)
Sarcophaga tsushimae Senior-White, 1924
Sarcophaga tuberosa Pandellé, 1896
Sarcophaga uliginosa Kramer, 1908
Sarcophaga ussuriensis (Kolomiets & Artamonov, 1981)
Sarcophaga vadoni Zumpt, 1969
Sarcophaga vanriebeecki Zumpt, 1953
Sarcophaga vietnamica (Verves, 1980)
Sarcophaga voluptus (Verves, 1986)
Sarcophaga wagneri Kano & Zumpt, 1968
Sarcophaga walshi Ho, 1938
Sarcophaga wetzeli Kano & Zumpt, 1968
Sarcophaga wysokii (Lehrer, 2008)
Sarcophaga yorkii Parker, 1919
Sarcophaga yvorei Rickenbach, 1977
Subgenus Livingstonelia Lehrer, 2003
Sarcophaga gertrudae Zumpt, 1953
Subgenus Lucyphalla Lehrer, 2005
Sarcophaga nuzzacii (Lehrer, 2005)
Subgenus Macabiella
Subgenus Magnicauda
Sarcophaga linjiangensis (Wei, 2005)
Subgenus Malliophalla Lehrer, 1994
Sarcophaga optata (Zumpt, 1972)
Subgenus Mandalania Lehrer, 1994
Sarcophaga teskeyi (Lehrer, 1994)
Subgenus Mauritiella Verves, 1989
Sarcophaga kikuyana (Lehrer, 2006)
Sarcophaga mutesa (Lehrer, 2005)
Sarcophaga rayssae (Lehrer, 1993)
Sarcophaga sachsae (Lehrer, 1993)
Sarcophaga sukumaia (Lehrer, 2010)
Sarcophaga transvaalensis Zumpt, 1950
Subgenus Mehria Enderlein, 1928
Sarcophaga cockerellae Aldrich, 1916
Sarcophaga guyanensis (Lopes, 1946)
Sarcophaga hineii Hall, 1929
Sarcophaga houghi Aldrich, 1916
Sarcophaga insularis Lopes, 1946
Sarcophaga lanna Pape & Bänziger, 2003
Sarcophaga litsingeri (Shinonaga & Barrion, 1980)
Sarcophaga lorosa Hall, 1937
Sarcophaga minutissima Hall, 1929
Sarcophaga nemoralis Kramer, 1908
Sarcophaga olsoufjevi (Rohdendorf, 1937)
Sarcophaga sexpunctata (Fabricius, 1805)
Sarcophaga silbergliedi (Lopes, 1981)
Sarcophaga subaenescens Aldrich, 1925
Sarcophaga tsintaoensis (Ye, 1965)
Subgenus Membranophalla Verves, 1997
Sarcophaga membranocorporis Sugiyama, 1987
Subgenus Mimarhopocnemis Rohdendorf, 1937
Sarcophaga granulata Kramer, 1908
Subgenus Mindanaoa
Sarcophaga villipes (Lopes & Kano, 1979)
Subgenus Mitumbana Lehrer, 2003
Sarcophaga kisangani Curran, 1934
Sarcophaga lubaia (Lehrer, 2005)
Subgenus Montagnieria Lehrer, 2005
Sarcophaga loandania (Lehrer, 2009)
Sarcophaga todiscoae (Lehrer, 2005)
Subgenus Mufindia Verves, 1990
Sarcophaga tanzaniae Zumpt, 1972
Subgenus Myorhina Robineau-Desvoidy, 1830
Sarcophaga asahinai Kano, 1962
Sarcophaga iulicida Pape, 1990
Sarcophaga keziviana (Lehrer, 2009)
Sarcophaga lageniharpes (Xue & Feng, 1989)
Sarcophaga lunigera Böttcher, 1914
Sarcophaga nigriventris Meigen, 1826
Sarcophaga recurvata (Chen & Yao, 1985)
Sarcophaga socrus Rondani, 1861
Sarcophaga soror Rondani, 1861
Sarcophaga sororcula Rohdendorf, 1937
Sarcophaga villeneuvei Böttcher, 1912
Subgenus Nagpuria Verves, 1997
Sarcophaga vervesi (Nandi, 1993)
Subgenus Nandimyia Verves, 1997
Sarcophaga panchganiensis (Nandi, 1993)
Subgenus Neobellieria Blanchard, 1939
Sarcophaga bullata Parker, 1916 - (grey fleshfly)
Sarcophaga citellivora Shewell, 1950
Sarcophaga cooleyi Parker, 1914
Sarcophaga libera Aldrich, 1916
Sarcophaga longisterna Giroux & Wheeler, 2009
Sarcophaga offecta Lopes, 1938
Sarcophaga polistensis Hall, 1933
Sarcophaga triplasia Wulp, 1896
Subgenus Neosarcophaga Shewell, 1996
Sarcophaga canadensis Hall, 1929
Sarcophaga elongata Aldrich, 1916
Sarcophaga gracilis Aldrich, 1916
Sarcophaga occidentalis Aldrich, 1916
Sarcophaga perissa Reinhard, 1952
Sarcophaga perspicax Aldrich, 1916
Sarcophaga pubicornis (Coquillett, 1902)
Sarcophaga statuta Reinhard, 1952
Sarcophaga thatuna Aldrich, 1916
Sarcophaga vancouverensis Parker, 1918
Sarcophaga wrangeliensis Parker, 1920
Subgenus Nesbittia Verves, 1989
Sarcophaga bergsoni (Lehrer, 1993)
Sarcophaga dysderci Villeneuve, 1936
Sarcophaga etoshana (Lehrer, 2005)
Sarcophaga guillarmodi Zumpt, 1950
Sarcophaga munronis Pape, 1996
Sarcophaga wieseli (Lehrer, 1993)
Subgenus Nihonea Rohdendorf, 1965
Sarcophaga hokurikuensis Hori, 1955
Subgenus Nudicerca Rohdendorf, 1965
Sarcophaga furutonensis Kano & Okazaki, 1956
Subgenus Nuzzaciella Lehrer, 1994
Sarcophaga londti (Lehrer, 1994)
Subgenus Nyikamyia Lehrer, 1994
Sarcophaga barracloughiana (Lehrer, 1994)
Subgenus Pandelleana Rohdendorf, 1937
Sarcophaga andaluciana (Lehrer, 2004)
Sarcophaga insularis (Povolný, 1997)
Sarcophaga kugleri (Lehrer, 2004)
Sarcophaga myceniana (Lehrer, 2009)
Sarcophaga protuberans Pandellé, 1896 - (Pandelleana protuberans)
Sarcophaga siciliae (Povolný, 1998)
Sarcophaga struthioides (Xue, Feng & Liu, 1986)
Sarcophaga tanita (Lehrer, 2013)
Subgenus Pandelleisca Rohdendorf, 1937
Sarcophaga assamensis (Nandi & Ray, 1982)
Sarcophaga bainbriggei Senior-White, 1925
Sarcophaga ballardi Senior-White, 1924
Sarcophaga baudeti (Lehrer, 1998)
Sarcophaga curvata (Nandi, 1989)
Sarcophaga gresiventris Salem, 1946
Sarcophaga hui Ho, 1936
Sarcophaga insula Pape, 1996
Sarcophaga iwuensis Ho, 1934
Sarcophaga kawayuensis Kano, 1950
Sarcophaga kurahashii Nandi, 1992
Sarcophaga lorengauensis (Lopes, 1967)
Sarcophaga pingi Ho, 1934
Sarcophaga polystylata Ho, 1934
Sarcophaga scopariiformis Senior-White, 1927
Sarcophaga similis Meade, 1876
Sarcophaga taka Pape, 1996
Sarcophaga theodori (Lehrer, 1998)
Sarcophaga tristylata Böttcher, 1912
Subgenus Pandelleola Rohdendorf, 1937
Sarcophaga hanita (Lehrer, 2008)
Sarcophaga immortalis (Lehrer, 2013)
Sarcophaga karmelina (Lehrer, 2013)
Sarcophaga lunzeria (Lehrer, 2012)
Sarcophaga pieriana (Lehrer, 2012)
Subgenus Papesarcophaga Kurahashi & Kakinuma, 2015
Sarcophaga kisarazuensis (Kurahashi & Kakinuma, 2015)
Sarcophaga tainanensis (Kurahashi, Yang & Kakinuma, 2017)
Subgenus Paraethiopisca Zumpt, 1972
Sarcophaga dewulfi Zumpt, 1967
Subgenus Parasarcophaga Johnston & Tiegs, 1921
Sarcophaga abaensis (Feng & Qiao, 2003)
Sarcophaga albiceps Meigen, 1826 - (Flesh fly)
Sarcophaga aliena Walker, 1856
Sarcophaga balayana (Lehrer, 2008)
Sarcophaga bohboti (Lehrer, 2000)
Sarcophaga brevis Walker, 1864
Sarcophaga faenionota Kano et al., 2000
Sarcophaga flavifemorata Macquart, 1851
Sarcophaga flavipalpis Senior-White, 1924
Sarcophaga hirtipes Wiedemann, 1830
Sarcophaga knabi Parker, 1917
Sarcophaga knadi Quo, 1952
Sarcophaga lekebai Shinonaga, 2004
Sarcophaga macroauriculata Ho, 1932
Sarcophaga misera Walker, 1849 - (Flesh fly)
Sarcophaga omega Johnston & Tiegs, 1921
Sarcophaga taenionota (Wiedemann, 1819)
Sarcophaga tupada (Lehrer, 2008)
Sarcophaga unguitigris (Rohdendorf, 1938)
Subgenus Perisimyia Xue & Verves, 2009
Sarcophaga perisi (Xue & Verves, 2009)
Subgenus Petuniophalla Lehrer, 1994
Sarcophaga stuckenbergiana (Lehrer, 1994)
Subgenus Phalacrodiscus Enderlein, 1928
Sarcophaga dahliana (Enderlein, 1928)
Subgenus Phallantha Rohdendorf, 1938
Sarcophaga keegani Kano & Shinonaga, 1964
Sarcophaga sichotealini (Rohdendorf, 1938)
Subgenus Phallanthisca Rohdendorf, 1965
Sarcophaga magensi Kano, 1957
Sarcophaga shirakii (Kano & Field, 1963)
Subgenus Phallocheira Rohdendorf, 1937
Sarcophaga minor (Rohdendorf, 1937)
Subgenus Phallonychia Verves, 1982
Sarcophaga oshimensis (Kano & Field, 1964)
Subgenus Phallosarcophaga
Sarcophaga cutbertsoni (Lehrer, 2006)
Subgenus Phallosphaera Rohdendorf, 1938
Sarcophaga amica (Ma, 1964)
Sarcophaga amicoides (Kurahashi & Tan, 2012)
Sarcophaga barioensis (Kurahashi & Tan, 2012)
Sarcophaga gravelyi Senior-White, 1924
Sarcophaga konakovi (Rohdendorf, 1938)
Sarcophaga kurahashii (Shinonaga & Tumrasvin, 1979)
Sarcophaga metzgeri (Kano & Shinonaga, 1964)
Sarcophaga yelangiops (Lehrer & Wei, 2011)
Subgenus Pharaonops Lehrer, 2003
Sarcophaga tewfiki Salem, 1940
Subgenus Philiphaga Lehrer, 2008
Sarcophaga batangomyia Lehrer, 2008
Subgenus Phytosarcophaga Rohdendorf, 1937
Sarcophaga destructor Malloch, 1929
Sarcophaga dialensis Mawlood, 2006
Subgenus Pierretia
Sarcophaga thinhi (Kano & Kurahashi, 2000)
Subgenus Poecilometopa Villeneuve, 1913
Sarcophaga dimidiatipes (Villeneuve, 1913)
Sarcophaga flavibasis Malloch, 1928
Sarcophaga kericho Pape, 1996
Sarcophaga nitidiventris Malloch, 1928
Sarcophaga octomaculata Jaennicke, 1867
Sarcophaga punctipennis Malloch, 1928
Sarcophaga spilogaster (Wiedemann, 1824)
Subgenus Poseidonimyia Verves, 1997
Sarcophaga simplex (Lopes, 1967)
Subgenus Povolnymyia Verves, 1997
Sarcophaga lingulata (Ye, 1980)
Subgenus Prionophalla Rohdendorf, 1963
Sarcophaga braunsi Engel, 1925
Sarcophaga freyi Zumpt, 1953
Sarcophaga goergeni (Lehrer, 2005)
Sarcophaga langi Curran, 1934
Sarcophaga leechi Zumpt, 1967
Sarcophaga lomagundica (Rohdendorf, 1963)
Sarcophaga namaquensis Zumpt, 1951
Sarcophaga praerupta Villeneuve, 1930
Sarcophaga silvai Zumpt, 1952
Subgenus Pseudaethiopisca Verves, 1989
Sarcophaga dinuzului Zumpt, 1972
Subgenus Pseudodiscachaeta
Sarcophaga imbecilla Karsch, 1886
Subgenus Pseudothyrsocnema Rohdendorf, 1937
Sarcophaga borneensis (Shinonaga & Lopes, 1975)
Sarcophaga caudagalli Böttcher, 1912
Sarcophaga crinitula Quo, 1952
Sarcophaga indica (Shinonaga & Lopes, 1975)
Sarcophaga kairatuensis Shinonaga, 2004
Sarcophaga lhasae (Fan, 1964)
Sarcophaga longistylata (Shinonaga & Lopes, 1975)
Sarcophaga nicobarensis (Nandi, 1989)
Sarcophaga panaya (Lehrer, 2008)
Sarcophaga spinosa Villeneuve, 1912
Subgenus Pterolobomyia Lehrer, 1993
Sarcophaga einsteiniella (Lehrer, 1993)
Sarcophaga kalahariana (Lehrer, 2005)
Sarcophaga turkanella (Lehrer, 2005)
Subgenus Pterophalla Rohdendorf, 1955
Sarcophaga oitana Hori, 1955
Subgenus Pterosarcophaga Ye, 1981
Sarcophaga emeishanensis (Ye & Ni, 1981)
Subgenus Ranavalona Lehrer, 2003
Sarcophaga stuckenbergi Zumpt, 1964
Subgenus Robertiana
Subgenus Robineauella Enderlein, 1928
Sarcophaga anchoriformis (Fan, 1964)
Sarcophaga caerulescens Zetterstedt, 1838
Sarcophaga carpatina (Lehrer, 2008)
Sarcophaga coei (Rohdendorf, 1966)
Sarcophaga daurica (Grunin, 1964)
Sarcophaga djakonovi (Rohdendorf, 1937)
Sarcophaga grunini (Rohdendorf, 1938)
Sarcophaga huangshanensis (Fan, 1964)
Sarcophaga japonica Hori, 1954
Sarcophaga javana Macquart, 1851
Sarcophaga kopetdaghica (Verves, 1979)
Sarcophaga mendeliana (Lehrer, 2008)
Sarcophaga nearctica Parker, 1916
Sarcophaga picibasicosta Pape, 1996
Sarcophaga pseudoscoparia Kramer, 1911
Sarcophaga rohdendorfiana (Trofimov, 1948)
Sarcophaga simultaneousa (Wei & Yang, 2007)
Sarcophaga thailandica (Kurahashi & Chaiwong, 2013)
Sarcophaga uemotoi (Kano & Field, 1964)
Sarcophaga walayari Senior-White, 1924
Subgenus Rohdendorfisca Grunin, 1964
Sarcophaga flagellifera (Grunin, 1964)
Subgenus Rosellea Rohdendorf, 1937
Sarcophaga aratrix Pandellé, 1896
Sarcophaga beckiana (Lehrer, 1996)
Sarcophaga gigas Thomas, 1949
Sarcophaga hainanna (Xue & Zhang, 2004)
Sarcophaga khasiensis Senior-White, 1924
Sarcophaga naumanni (Lehrer & Martínez-Sánchez, 2000)
Subgenus Rossikenya
Subgenus Sabakia Lehrer, 2005
Sarcophaga tanzaniella (Lehrer, 2005)
Subgenus Sabiella Verves, 1990
Sarcophaga mandelania (Lehrer, 2005)
Subgenus Salemmyia Verves, 2001
Sarcophaga austenii Salem, 1938
Subgenus Saputaramyia Verves, 2001
Sarcophaga saputaraensis (Nandi, 1992)
Subgenus Sarconandia Lehrer, 2005
Sarcophaga madrasiola (Lehrer, 2005)
Subgenus Sarcophaga Meigen, 1824
Sarcophaga adriatica Böttcher, 1913
Sarcophaga apsuarum Rohdendorf, 1937
Sarcophaga bachmayeri Lehrer, 1978
Sarcophaga baranoffi Rohdendorf, 1937
Sarcophaga bergi Rohdendorf, 1937
Sarcophaga carnaria (Linnaeus, 1758) - (camouflaged flesh fly)
Sarcophaga congesta Lehrer, 1967
Sarcophaga croatica Baranov, 1941
Sarcophaga disputata Lehrer, 1967
Sarcophaga hennigi Lehrer, 1978
Sarcophaga jeanleclercqi Lehrer, 1975
Sarcophaga jupalnica Lehrer, 1967
Sarcophaga kaplani Lehrer, 1999
Sarcophaga lehmanni Müller, 1922
Sarcophaga marcelleclercqi Lehrer, 1975
Sarcophaga matilei Blackith, Richet, Pape & Andreï-Ruiz, 2001
Sarcophaga moldavica Rohdendorf, 1937
Sarcophaga moravica Povolný, 1986
Sarcophaga mouchajosefi Lehrer, 1978
Sarcophaga ornatijuxta Richet, Pape & Blackith, 1995
Sarcophaga pagensis Baranov, 1939
Sarcophaga pyrenaica Séguy, 1941
Sarcophaga romanica Lehrer, 1967
Sarcophaga schusteri Lehrer, 1959
Sarcophaga serbica Baranov, 1930
Sarcophaga subvicina Rohdendorf, 1937
Sarcophaga trabzonensis Pekbey, Hayat, Richet & Blackith, 2011
Sarcophaga ukrainica Rohdendorf, 1937
Sarcophaga variegata (Scopoli, 1763)
Sarcophaga wallenbergi Lehrer, 1989
Sarcophaga zumptiana Lehrer, 1959
Subgenus Sarcorohdendorfia Baranov, 1938
Sarcophaga alpha Johnston & Tiegs, 1921
Sarcophaga antilope Böttcher, 1913
Sarcophaga assimilis Macquart, 1851
Sarcophaga aureifacies (Lopes, 1967)
Sarcophaga aureolata Pape & Kurahashi, 2000
Sarcophaga beta Johnston & Tiegs, 1921
Sarcophaga bidentata (Lopes, 1953)
Sarcophaga bifrons Walker, 1853
Sarcophaga braueri Salem, 1946
Sarcophaga cirrhura Bezzi, 1927
Sarcophaga clavus Meiklejohn, Wallman & Pape, 2013
Sarcophaga confusio Geisler & Pape, 2023
Sarcophaga darwiniana (Kano & Lopes, 1979)
Sarcophaga desaii (Nandi, 1978)
Sarcophaga emuensis (Lopes & Kano, 1979)
Sarcophaga fergusonina Hardy, 1940
Sarcophaga froggatti Taylor, 1917
Sarcophaga furcata Hardy, 1932
Sarcophaga ghaiae (Nandi, 1979)
Sarcophaga henryi Senior-White, 1924
Sarcophaga hiromui Kano, 1994
Sarcophaga hollandia Roback, 1952
Sarcophaga horti Blackith & Blackith, 1988
Sarcophaga howensis Johnston & Hardy, 1923
Sarcophaga ikat Pape & Kurahashi, 2004
Sarcophaga ikedai Shinonaga, 2004
Sarcophaga impatiens Walker, 1849
Sarcophaga indusa (Curran, 1936)
Sarcophaga inextricata Walker, 1859
Sarcophaga irrequieta Walker, 1849
Sarcophaga longifilia Salem, 1946
Sarcophaga magnifica (Baranov, 1936)
Sarcophaga maxima Meiklejohn, Pape, Wallman & Dowton, 2017
Sarcophaga megafilosia Pape, McKillup & McKillup, 2000
Sarcophaga meiofilosia Pape, McKillup & McKillup, 2000
Sarcophaga mimobasalis (Ma, 1964)
Sarcophaga mont Pape, 1996
Sarcophaga multivillosa (Shinonaga & Tumrasvin, 1979)
Sarcophaga narabondxii Geisler & Pape, 2023
Sarcophaga omikron Johnston & Tiegs, 1921
Sarcophaga pattoni Senior-White, 1924
Sarcophaga piciventris Pape, 1996
Sarcophaga piva Roback, 1952
Sarcophaga praedatrix Walker, 1849
Sarcophaga pusana Senior-White, 1924
Sarcophaga rhynchura Bezzi, 1927
Sarcophaga saprianovae Pape & Bänziger, 2000
Sarcophaga seniorwhitei Ho, 1938
Sarcophaga separata (Lopes, 1967)
Sarcophaga serratocudo Pape & Kurahashi, 2004
Sarcophaga spinigera (Lopes, 1953)
Sarcophaga stylata Pape, 1996
Sarcophaga sundaensis Shinonaga, 2004
Sarcophaga triplex Hardy, 1943
Sarcophaga uncus Pape & Kurahashi, 2004
Sarcophaga urceola (Shinonaga & Beaver, 1979)
Sarcophaga variabilis (Lopes, 1958)
Sarcophaga villisterna Salem, 1946
Sarcophaga whitneyi (Curran, 1936)
Sarcophaga wujiangiana (Lehrer & Wei, 2011)
Sarcophaga wumengia (Lehrer & Wei, 2011)
Sarcophaga zeta Johnston & Tiegs, 1921
Subgenus Sarcosolomonia Baranov, 1938
Sarcophaga andamanensis (Nandi, 1989)
Sarcophaga arabari Pape, 1996
Sarcophaga aureomarginata (Shinonaga & Tumrasvin, 1979)
Sarcophaga baranovi (Lopes, 1967)
Sarcophaga buxtoni Salem, 1946
Sarcophaga carolinensis (Lopes, 1958)
Sarcophaga chalcura Bezzi, 1927
Sarcophaga chambaensis (Nandi, 1989)
Sarcophaga circa Pape & Bänziger, 2003
Sarcophaga collessi Meiklejohn, Wallman & Pape, 2013
Sarcophaga confusa (Lopes, 1967)
Sarcophaga crinita Parker, 1917
Sarcophaga fabea (Lopes, 1959)
Sarcophaga guanyina (Lehrer & Wei, 2010)
Sarcophaga hai (Kano & Kurahashi, 2000)
Sarcophaga harinasutai (Kano & Sooksri, 1977)
Sarcophaga hongheensis (Li & Ye, 1992)
Sarcophaga kaushanensis (Nandi, 1990)
Sarcophaga kupangensis Shinonaga, 2004
Sarcophaga lombokensis Shinonaga, 2004
Sarcophaga lopesi (Shinonaga & Kurahashi, 1969)
Sarcophaga maai (Shinonaga & Kurahashi, 1969)
Sarcophaga occulta (Lopes & Kano, 1969)
Sarcophaga papuensis (Shinonaga & Kurahashi, 1969)
Sarcophaga rohdendorfia Pape, 1996
Sarcophaga sedlaceki (Shinonaga & Kurahashi, 1969)
Sarcophaga setifacies (Lopes, 1967)
Sarcophaga shinonagai (Kano & Sooksri, 1977)
Sarcophaga shresthai (Kano & Shinonaga, 1969)
Sarcophaga stricklandi Hall & Bohart, 1948
Sarcophaga sumunensis (Lopes, 1967)
Sarcophaga susainathani Pape, 1996
Sarcophaga synia Johnston & Hardy, 1923
Sarcophaga trifulcata (Shinonaga & Tumrasvin, 1979)
Sarcophaga tulagiensis (Baranov, 1938)
Sarcophaga versatilis (Lopes, 1959)
Subgenus Sarcotachinella Townsend, 1892
Sarcophaga sinuata Meigen, 1826
Subgenus Scotathyrsia Enderlein, 1937
Sarcophaga cuthbersoni (Lehrer, 2003)
Sarcophaga liberia Curran, 1934
Sarcophaga notatipennis Austen, 1909
Sarcophaga samia Curran, 1934
Subgenus Seniorwhitea Rohdendorf, 1937
Sarcophaga mantiae (Nandi, 2002)
Sarcophaga orientalis Parker, 1917
Sarcophaga phoenicopterus Böttcher, 1913
Sarcophaga princeps Wiedemann, 1830 - (Flesh fly)
Sarcophaga schoemani Zumpt, 1951
Subgenus Seselwana Lehrer, 2003
Sarcophaga aldabrae Zumpt, 1973
Subgenus Sinonipponia Rohdendorf, 1965
Sarcophaga aniyai Kano, 1957
Sarcophaga bengalensis (Nandi, 1977)
Sarcophaga cheesmanae Salem, 1946
Sarcophaga concreata Séguy, 1934
Sarcophaga hainanensis Ho, 1936
Sarcophaga hervebazini Séguy, 1934
Sarcophaga javi Salem, 1946
Sarcophaga komi (Kurahashi & Sukontason, 2004)
Sarcophaga musashinensis Kano & Okazaki, 1956
Sarcophaga papaii (Nandi, 1988)
Sarcophaga smarti (Nandi, 1991)
Subgenus Sinopierretia Verves, 1997
Sarcophaga bihami (Qian & Fan, 1981)
Subgenus Sisyhelicobia Zumpt, 1972
Sarcophaga sisyphus Zumpt, 1952
Subgenus Sokotriella Lehrer, 2005
Sarcophaga jamila (Lehrer, 2005)
Subgenus Stackelbergeola Rohdendorf, 1937
Sarcophaga fedtshenkoi (Rohdendorf, 1937)
Sarcophaga galileana (Lehrer, 1999)
Sarcophaga grueti (Lehrer, 1999)
Sarcophaga mehadiensis Böttcher, 1912
Sarcophaga paramonovi (Rohdendorf, 1937)
Sarcophaga sushkini (Rohdendorf, 1937)
Sarcophaga zarudnyi (Rohdendorf, 1937)
Subgenus Sugiyamamyia Verves, 1997
Sarcophaga tsengi Sugiyama, 1987
Subgenus Takanoa
Sarcophaga hakusana Hori, 1954
Sarcophaga rugosa (Rohdendorf, 1969)
Subgenus Takaraia Kano & Field, 1963
Sarcophaga yonahaensis (Kano & Field, 1963)
Subgenus Taylorimyia Lopes, 1959
Sarcophaga aurifrons Macquart, 1846
Subgenus Thyrsocnema Enderlein, 1928
Sarcophaga belgiana (Lehrer, 1976)
Sarcophaga corsicana Villeneuve, 1911
Sarcophaga dasguptai (Nandi, 1979)
Sarcophaga incisilobata Pandellé, 1896
Sarcophaga kentejana (Rohdendorf, 1937)
Sarcophaga lushainensis (Nandi, 1992)
Sarcophaga niculescui (Lehrer, 1994)
Sarcophaga platariae (Povolný, 1992)
Sarcophaga pulla Aldrich, 1916
Sarcophaga solitaria (Povolný, 1998)
Sarcophaga transpyrenaica (Povolný, 1995)
Subgenus Tolucamyia Dodge, 1965
Sarcophaga cavagnaroi (Dodge, 1965)
Sarcophaga schrameli Dodge, 1967
Sarcophaga sigilla Reinhard, 1947
Subgenus Torgopampa Lopes, 1975
Subgenus Transvaalomyia Lehrer, 1992
Sarcophaga erlangeri (Lehrer & Lehrer, 1992)
Sarcophaga somalica Rudzinski & Baumjohann, 2009
Subgenus Tuberomembrana Fan, 1981
Sarcophaga xizangensis (Fan, 1981)
Subgenus Uroxanthisca Rohdendorf, 1963
Sarcophaga absurda (Lehrer, 2000)
Sarcophaga benefactor Malloch, 1929
Sarcophaga calicifera Böttcher, 1912
Sarcophaga dispessa Villeneuve, 1936
Sarcophaga eos Zumpt, 1955
Sarcophaga furcoides Zumpt, 1967
Sarcophaga germaini Rickenbach, 1977
Sarcophaga inducta Curran, 1934
Sarcophaga liberiphaga (Lehrer, 2005)
Sarcophaga lindneriana Zumpt, 1954
Sarcophaga malgache Zumpt, 1964
Sarcophaga plutus Zumpt, 1954
Sarcophaga selene (Curran, 1934)
Subgenus Varirosellea Xue, 1979
Sarcophaga aldrichi Parker, 1916
Subgenus Virugana
Sarcophaga musitali Curran, 1934
Subgenus Wittemyia
Sarcophaga turkanella Lehrer, 2008
Subgenus Wohlfahrtiopsis Townsend, 1917
Sarcophaga beeri Dodge, 1966
Sarcophaga bishoppi Aldrich, 1916
Sarcophaga georgiana Dodge, 1966
Sarcophaga johnsoni Aldrich, 1916
Sarcophaga kesseli Dodge, 1966
Sarcophaga utilis Aldrich, 1915
Subgenus Xanthopterisca Rohdendorf, 1963
Sarcophaga aheria (Lehrer, 1996)
Sarcophaga condona (Curran, 1934)
Sarcophaga dromafricana (Lehrer, 2001)
Sarcophaga elegantipes Villeneuve, 1921
Sarcophaga freidbergi (Lehrer, 2001)
Sarcophaga gadiriana (Lehrer, 1996)
Sarcophaga mazaliana (Lehrer, 1996)
Sarcophaga nihbadella (Lehrer, 1996)
Sarcophaga regularis Wiedemann, 1830
Sarcophaga ziegleri (Lehrer, 2005)
Sarcophaga zulunata (Lehrer, 2005)
Subgenus Yemeniella Lehrer, 2005
Sarcophaga friedmani (Lehrer, 2008)
Sarcophaga suhaylia (Lehrer, 2005)
Subgenus Yunnanisca Verves, 1997
Sarcophaga fani (Li & Ye, 1985)
Subgenus Ziminisca Rohdendorf, 1965
Sarcophaga semenovi Rohdendorf, 1925
Subgenus Zombanella Lehrer, 1993
Sarcophaga ehrlichi (Lehrer, 1993)
Subgenus Zumptiopsis Lehrer, 1992
Sarcophaga hera Zumpt, 1972
Sarcophaga sapitwana (Lehrer, 2011)
Sarcophaga surda Curran, 1934
Subgenus Zumptisca Rohdendorf, 1963
Sarcophaga bulamatadi Curran, 1934
Sarcophaga oharai (Lehrer, 1994)
Sarcophaga retrostylata (Lehrer, 2009)
Subgenus not assigned
Sarcophaga aenigmoides Povolný, 1987
Sarcophaga agrestis (Robineau-Desvoidy, 1863)
Sarcophaga ambon Pape, 1995
Sarcophaga baruai Sugiyama, Shinonaga & Kano, 1988
Sarcophaga beninella (Lehrer, 2003)
Sarcophaga berberina (Lehrer, 2003)
Sarcophaga birganjensis Sugiyama, 1988
Sarcophaga borodorf Pape, 1996
Sarcophaga brachiata Sugiyama, Shinonaga & Kano, 1990
Sarcophaga caledonia Pape, 1996
Sarcophaga claviger Blackith & Blackith, 1988
Sarcophaga curvicercus Sugiyama, Shinonaga & Kano, 1990
Sarcophaga daciana Lehrer, 2008
Sarcophaga dawahi Deeming, 2024
Sarcophaga diatraeae (Brèthes, 1927)
Sarcophaga discifera Pandellé, 1896
Sarcophaga disneyi Blackith & Blackith, 1988
Sarcophaga distincta Salem, 1946
Sarcophaga diurpaneia Lehrer, 2008
Sarcophaga dumoga Sugiyama & Kurahashi, 1988
Sarcophaga fenchihuensis Sugiyama, 1987
Sarcophaga hirsuta Sugiyama, Shinonaga & Kano, 1990
Sarcophaga hugoi Pape, 1996
Sarcophaga isorokui Shinonaga & Kano, 1993
Sarcophaga karachiensis Bilqees, Ali & Khan, 1984
Sarcophaga karna Pape, 1996
Sarcophaga kartabo Curran & Walley, 1934
Sarcophaga kiyokoae Chaiwong, Sukontason & Sukontason, 2009
Sarcophaga limbatella (Bezzi, 1928)
Sarcophaga malaitensis Shinonaga & Kano, 1993
Sarcophaga maramureshana Lehrer, 2008
Sarcophaga mariobezzii Pape, 1991
Sarcophaga melania (Shinonaga & Tumrasvin, 1979)
Sarcophaga menadensis Shinonaga, 2004
Sarcophaga mersinensis Pekbey, 2020
Sarcophaga mimobrevicornis Sugiyama, Shinonaga & Kano, 1990
Sarcophaga montiblensis Sugiyama, Shinonaga & Kano, 1990
Sarcophaga nigridorsalis Shinonaga & Kano, 1993
Sarcophaga omari (Kurahashi & Leh, 2007)
Sarcophaga palavae Povolný, 1993
Sarcophaga pandifera Blackith & Pape, 1999
Sarcophaga panormi Povolný, 1998
Sarcophaga polita Malloch, 1929
Sarcophaga quinqueramosa Sugiyama, Shinonaga & Kano, 1990
Sarcophaga robustispinosa Sugiyama, Shinonaga & Kano, 1990
Sarcophaga rozkosnyi Povolný, 2001
Sarcophaga smithiana Pape, 1996
Sarcophaga sorror Pape, 1995
Sarcophaga spinipenis (Shinonaga & Tumrasvin, 1979)
Sarcophaga suffa Pape, 1996
Sarcophaga tephroides Shinonaga & Kano, 1993
Sarcophaga vanuatu Pape, 1991
Sarcophaga vitilevensis Shinonaga & Kano, 1993
Sarcophaga wiesenthali Lehrer, 1989
Sarcophaga wyatti (Nandi, 1994)
Sarcophaga yuwanensis Sugiyama, 1991
Sarcophaga zimba Pape, 1996
