= Blaesoxipha =

Scientific classification
- Domain: Eukaryota
- Kingdom: Animalia
- Phylum: Arthropoda
- Class: Insecta
- Order: Diptera
- Family: Sarcophagidae
- Subfamily: Sarcophaginae
- Genus: Blaesoxipha; Loew, 1861

Genus of flies

Blaesoxipha is a genus of flies belonging to the family Sarcophagidae.

The genus has cosmopolitan distribution.

Species:

- Blaesoxipha acridiophagoides Lopes & Downs, 1951
- Blaesoxipha aculeata (Aldrich, 1916)
- Blaesoxipha filipjevi Rohd - parasite of Zonocerus variegatus
- Blaesoxipha lineata (Fallén)
- Blaesoxipha pachytyli - found in Australia
- Blaesoxipha plinthopyga (Wiedemann) - can cause myiasis
- Blaesoxipha plumicornis (Zetterstedt, 1859)
- Blaesoxipha redempta (Pandelle, 1896) - parasitoid of Stauroderus scalaris, present throughout Palearctic realm
- Blaesoxipha stallengi (Lahille, 1907)
