= Oxysarcodexia peltata =

Scientific classification
- Kingdom: Animalia
- Phylum: Arthropoda
- Class: Insecta
- Order: Diptera
- Family: Sarcophagidae
- Subfamily: Sarcophaginae
- Genus: Oxysarcodexia
- Species: O. peltata

Binomial name
- Oxysarcodexia peltata (Aldrich, 1916)

Synonyms
- Sarcophaga peltata Aldrich, 1916

Species of fly

Oxysarcodexia peltata is a species of fly in the family Sarcophagidae.

== Distribution ==
United States, Bahamas, Cuba, Dominica, Guadeloupe, Jamaica, Mexico, Panama, Puerto Rico, Saint Lucia.
