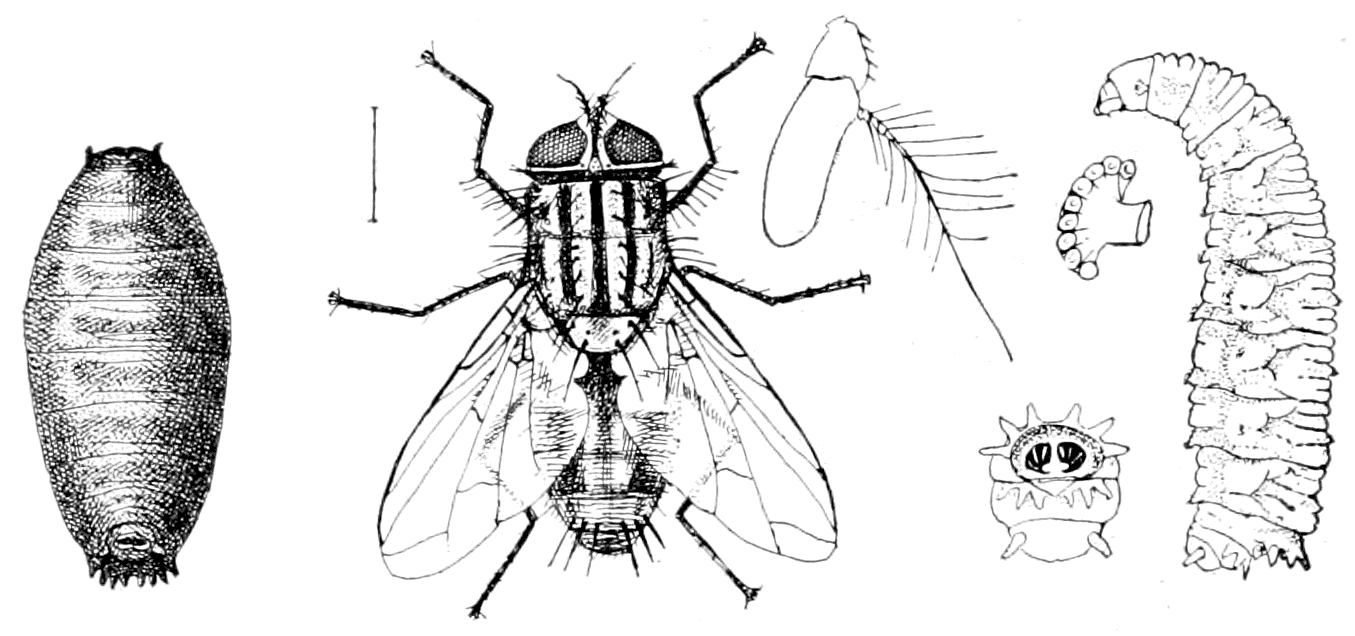
- Ravinia assidua

Scientific classification
- Kingdom: Animalia
- Phylum: Arthropoda
- Class: Insecta
- Order: Diptera
- Family: Sarcophagidae
- Subfamily: Sarcophaginae
- Genus: Ravinia; Robineau-Desvoidy, 1863

= Ravinia (fly) =

Genus of flies

Ravinia is a genus of flesh flies in the family Sarcophagidae. There are at least 30 described species in Ravinia.

== Species ==
These 37 species belong to the genus Ravinia:

- Ravinia acerba (Walker, 1849)^{i c g}
- Ravinia advena (Walker, 1853)^{c g}
- Ravinia almaqahia Lehrer, 2005^{c g}
- Ravinia anandra (Dodge, 1956)^{i c g}
- Ravinia assidua (Walker, 1852)^{i c g}
- Ravinia aureopyga (Hall, 1928)^{c g}
- Ravinia aurigena (Townsend, 1912)^{c g}
- Ravinia auromaculata (Townsend, 1915)^{c g}
- Ravinia barroi (Dodge, 1956)^{c g}
- Ravinia belforti (Prado & Fonseca, 1932)^{c g}
- Ravinia coachellensis (Hall, 1931)^{i c g}
- Ravinia columbiana (Lopes, 1962)^{c g}
- Ravinia dampfi (Lopes, 1946)^{c g}
- Ravinia derelicta (Walker, 1852)^{i c g}
- Ravinia effrenata (Walker, 1861)^{i c g}
- Ravinia errabunda (Wulp, 1896)^{i c g}
- Ravinia floridensis (Aldrich, 1916)^{i c g}
- Ravinia globulus (Aldrich, 1916)^{c g}
- Ravinia heithausi Lopes, 1975^{c g}
- Ravinia laakei (Hall, 1931)^{i c g}
- Ravinia latisetosa Parker, 1914^{i c g b}
- Ravinia lherminieri Robineau-desvoidy^{i c g}
- Ravinia meinckeae (Blanchard, 1939)^{c g}
- Ravinia ochracea (Aldrich, 1916)^{i c g}
- Ravinia ollantaytambensis (Hall, 1928)^{c g}
- Ravinia pectinata (Aldrich, 1916)^{i c g}
- Ravinia pernix (Harris, 1780)^{c g}
- Ravinia planifrons (Aldrich, 1916)^{i c g}
- Ravinia postnoda (Dodge, 1968)^{c g}
- Ravinia pusiola (Wulp, 1928)^{i c g}
- Ravinia quadrivittata (Macquart, 1843)^{c g}
- Ravinia querula (Walker, 1849)^{i c g}
- Ravinia rufipes (Townsend, 1917)^{c g}
- Ravinia stimulans (Walker, 1849)^{i c g}
- Ravinia sueta (Wulp, 1896)^{i c g}
- Ravinia tancituro Roback, 1952^{c g}
- Ravinia vagabunda (Wulp, 1895)^{c g}

Data sources: i = ITIS, c = Catalogue of Life, g = GBIF, b = Bugguide.net
