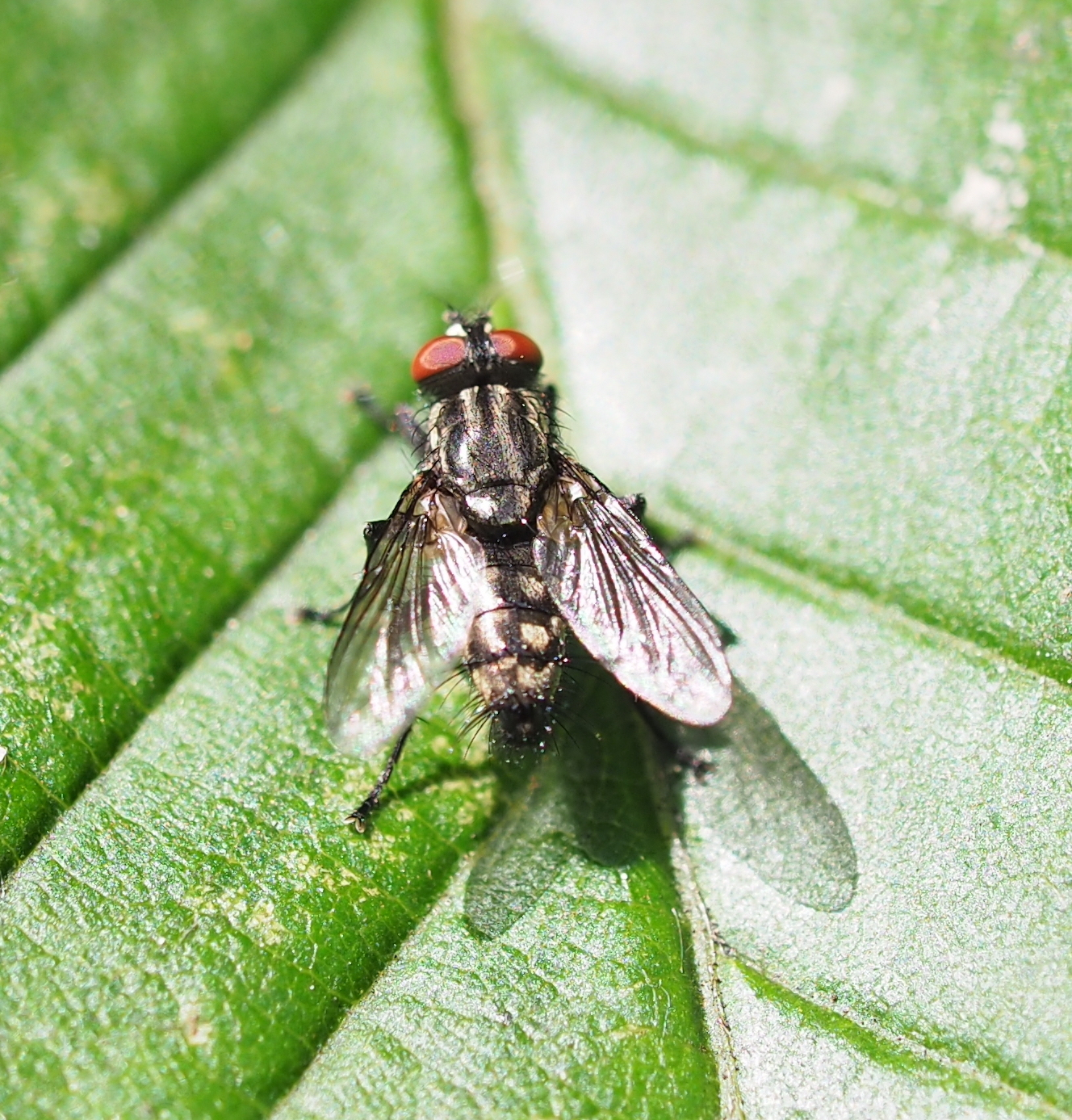
- Sarcophaga depressifrons, Austria

Scientific classification
- Kingdom: Animalia
- Phylum: Arthropoda
- Class: Insecta
- Order: Diptera
- Family: Sarcophagidae
- Subfamily: Sarcophaginae
- Genus: Sarcophaga
- Species: S. depressifrons

Binomial name
- Sarcophaga depressifrons Zetterstedt, 1845

Synonyms
- Sarcophaga compactilobata (Wyatt, 1991); Sarcophaga depressifrons Zetterstedt, 1845; Sarcophaga obscurata (Rohdendorf, 1937); Sarcophaga parva Quo, 1952; Heteronychia compactilobata Wyatt, 1991; Heteronychia depressifrons (Zetterstedt, 1845); Heteronychia quoi Fan, 1964; Heteronychia ubita Lehrer, 1999; Heteronychia ukrainica Verves, 1975; Pierretia obscurata Rohdendorf, 1937

= Sarcophaga depressifrons =

Species of fly

Sarcophaga depressifrons is a species of Common Flesh Fly in the family Sarcophagidae. It is found mainly in Europe.
