= Paedarium parvum =

Scientific classification
- Kingdom: Animalia
- Phylum: Arthropoda
- Class: Insecta
- Order: Diptera
- Family: Tachinidae
- Subfamily: Dexiinae
- Tribe: Voriini
- Genus: Paedarium
- Species: P. parvum

Binomial name
- Paedarium parvum Aldrich, 1926

Species of fly

Paedarium parvum is a species of fly in the family Tachinidae.

== Distribution ==
Jamaica.
