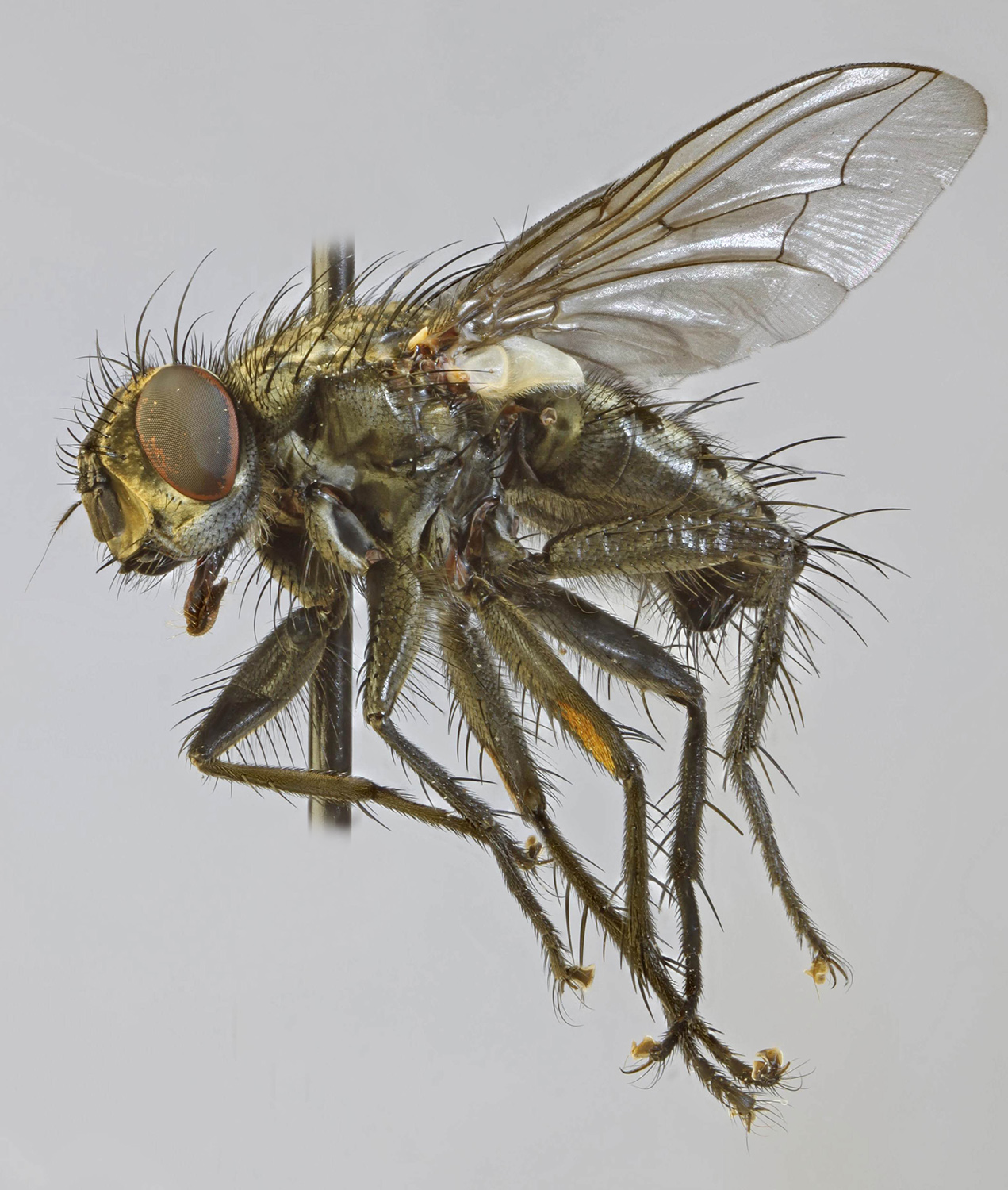
- Sarcophaga sinuata North Wales

Scientific classification
- Kingdom: Animalia
- Phylum: Arthropoda
- Class: Insecta
- Order: Diptera
- Family: Sarcophagidae
- Subfamily: Sarcophaginae
- Genus: Sarcophaga
- Species: S. sinuata

Binomial name
- Sarcophaga sinuata Meigen, 1826

= Sarcophaga sinuata =

Species of fly

Sarcophaga sinuata is a species of fly in the family Sarcophagidae. It is found in the Palearctic.
