= Sarcofahrtiopsis =

Scientific classification
- Domain: Eukaryota
- Kingdom: Animalia
- Phylum: Arthropoda
- Class: Insecta
- Order: Diptera
- Family: Sarcophagidae
- Subfamily: Sarcophaginae
- Genus: Sarcofahrtiopsis; Hall 1933

Type species
- Sarcofahrtia capitata Curran, 1928

Genus of flies

Sarcofahrtiopsis is a genus of small flesh flies. Most are known from the Antilles and Central America. Many species feed on semiterrestrial crabs of the genus Cardisoma or are associated with bats.

== Species ==
- S. baumhoveri Dodge, 1965
- S. capitata Curran, 1928
- S. carcini Pape & Mendez, 2002
- S. chiriqui Pape & Mendez, 2004
- S. cuneata (Townsend, 1935)
- S. kuna Pape & Mendez, 2004
- S. paterna Dodge, 1965
- S. piscosa Mendez, Mello-Patiu & Pape, 2008
- S. spathor Mello-Patiu & Pape, 2000
- S. thyropteronthos Pape, Pechmann & Vonhof, 2002
