= Boettcheria bisetosa =

Scientific classification
- Domain: Eukaryota
- Kingdom: Animalia
- Phylum: Arthropoda
- Class: Insecta
- Order: Diptera
- Family: Sarcophagidae
- Genus: Boettcheria
- Species: B. bisetosa

Binomial name
- Boettcheria bisetosa Parker, 1914

Species of fly

Boettcheria bisetosa is a species of flesh flies in the family Sarcophagidae.
