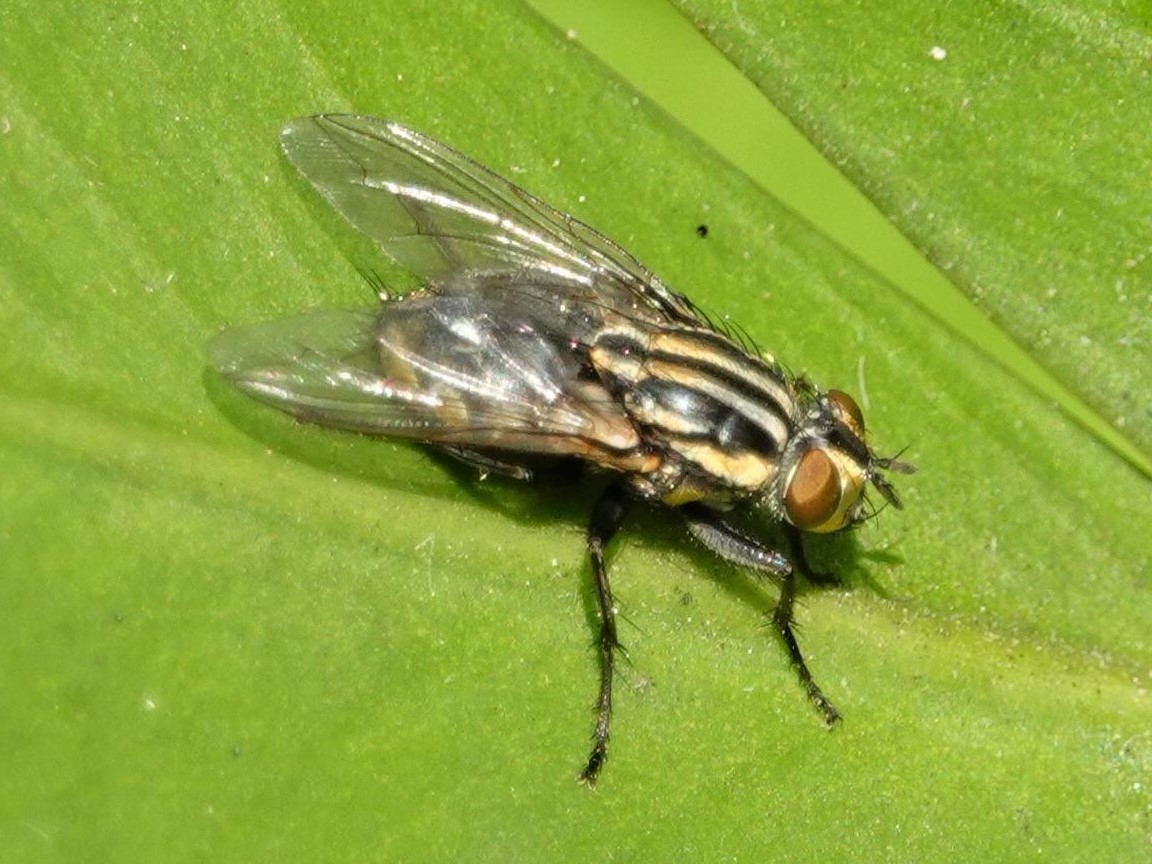

Scientific classification
- Kingdom: Animalia
- Phylum: Arthropoda
- Class: Insecta
- Order: Diptera
- Family: Sarcophagidae
- Genus: Oxysarcodexia
- Species: O. varia

Binomial name
- Oxysarcodexia varia (Walker, 1836)

= Striped dung fly =

Species of insect

Oxysarcodexia varia, commonly known by the name striped dung fly, is a species of insect in the family Sarcophagidae. It is found in parts of South America, Polynesia, Norfolk Island, and New Zealand.

== Description ==
The thorax of the fly is stripped from the head to tail with black and yellow stripes, the fly's legs are bristly and almost look fluffy. They look very much like the European flesh fly and share similar traits.

== Distribution and habitat ==
The Striped dung fly is considered to have originated South America and is now present across Oceania. It is found in Argentina, Brazil, Chile, Uruguay, Fiji, French Polynesia, Norfolk Island and New Zealand.

=== New Zealand range ===
The striped dung fly has been found throughout New Zealand and with a higher abundance of observations on the North Island. These sightings include Sutton Lake, Hurford, Otago, Kaikoura, Kerikeri, Tasman, Taranaki, Manawatū, Rotarua Island, Ruahine Ranges, Omaha Beach and Purakaunui.

=== Habitat preferences ===
The striped dung fly is found around the summer months and is commonly found in rubbish, long grasses and flowers. Their main habitat is open pastures and farms. This is due to the animal dung and compost they breed in. The striped dung fly prefers a habitat without large variations in temperature throughout the day.

== Life cycle ==
Dung fly females lay their eggs in the dung and within a few days the eggs hatch into larvae the eat the dung that they are. After about 21 days of feeding on the dung they burrow into the soil beneath the dung and become pupae. Then they become adult flies. There can be many generations of flies within a year. This life cycle above is common among the dung fly family.

== Diet and foraging ==
The Sarcophagidae which is from the same family as the Oxysarcodexia (striped dung fly) deposits hatched or hatching maggots instead of laying eggs. They deposit these maggots on either carrion, dung, decaying material, or open mammal wounds.

== Predators, parasites, and diseases ==
The striped dung fly in New Zealand is said to be involved in the rabbit haemorrhagic disease virus and how it is transmitted. An investigation was carried out from 1999 to 2001. There were five species of flies that were trapped and it was shown that the Sarcophagid fly was the most abundant fly on scrub edges but in open pastures it was the striped dung fly and the relationship was found that the abundance of the striped dung fly was associated with the break out of the disease in that area. A known predator of the striped dung fly is the house sparrow and the greenfinch as shown in the study from the New Zealand Journal of Zoology. “Oxysarcodexia varia was demonstrated to be capable of vectoring tapeworms Taenia ovis and T. hydatigena, which infest dogs and sheep”.
