= Paedarium neotropicum =

Scientific classification
- Kingdom: Animalia
- Phylum: Arthropoda
- Class: Insecta
- Order: Diptera
- Family: Tachinidae
- Subfamily: Dexiinae
- Tribe: Voriini
- Genus: Paedarium
- Species: P. neotropicum

Binomial name
- Paedarium neotropicum (Curran, 1926)

Synonyms
- Voria neotropica Curran, 1926

Species of fly

Paedarium neotropicum is a species of fly in the family Tachinidae.

== Distribution ==
Jamaica.
