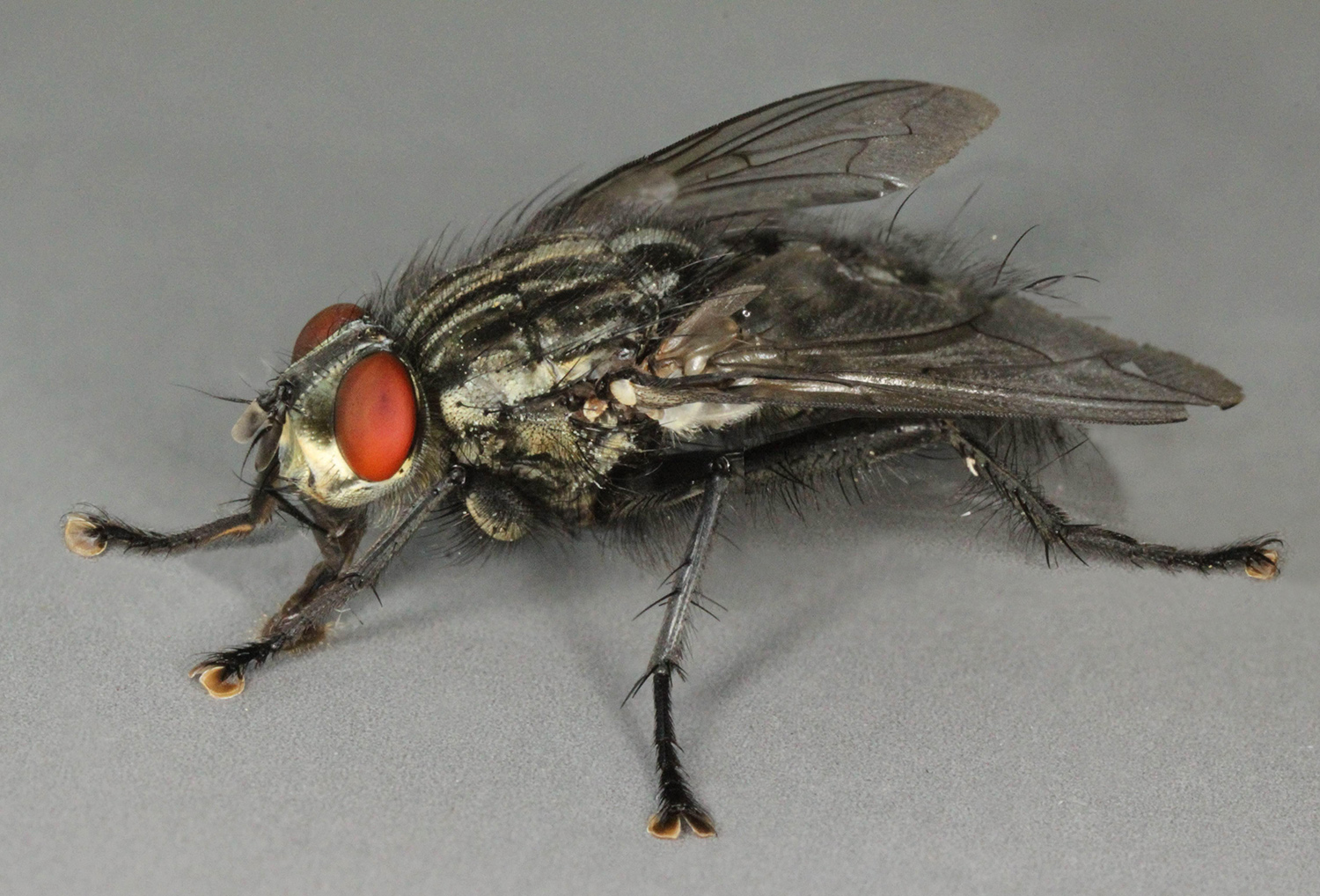
- Sarcophaga subvicina North Wales

Scientific classification
- Kingdom: Animalia
- Phylum: Arthropoda
- Class: Insecta
- Order: Diptera
- Family: Sarcophagidae
- Subfamily: Sarcophaginae
- Genus: Sarcophaga
- Species: S. subvicina

Binomial name
- Sarcophaga subvicina Baranov, 1937

= Sarcophaga subvicina =

Species of fly

Sarcophaga subvicina is a species of fly in the family Sarcophagidae. It is found in the Palearctic.
