= Helicobia rapax =

Scientific classification
- Kingdom: Animalia
- Phylum: Arthropoda
- Class: Insecta
- Order: Diptera
- Family: Sarcophagidae
- Genus: Helicobia
- Species: H. rapax

Binomial name
- Helicobia rapax (Walker, 1849)

Synonyms
- Sarcophaga helicis Townsend, 1892; Sarcophaga rapax Walker, 1849

Species of fly

Helicobia rapax is a species of flesh fly in the family Sarcophagidae.It can be a scavenger or an opportunistic parasitoid of insects or snails.
