= Sarcofahrtiopsis spathor =

Scientific classification
- Domain: Eukaryota
- Kingdom: Animalia
- Phylum: Arthropoda
- Class: Insecta
- Order: Diptera
- Family: Sarcophagidae
- Genus: Sarcofahrtiopsis
- Species: S. spathor

Binomial name
- Sarcofahrtiopsis spathor Mello-Patiu & Pape, 2000

Species of fly

Sarcofahrtiopsis spathor is a species of fly. It was found in the Dominican Republic.
