= Dexosarcophaga =

Scientific classification
- Domain: Eukaryota
- Kingdom: Animalia
- Phylum: Arthropoda
- Class: Insecta
- Order: Diptera
- Family: Sarcophagidae
- Subfamily: Sarcophaginae
- Genus: Dexosarcophaga; Townsend, 1917

Genus of flies

Dexosarcophaga is a genus of flies in the family Sarcophagidae. The genus can be found worldwide.

== List of species ==
- D. transita Townsend, 1917
- D. wyatti Mello-Patiu & Pape, 2000
