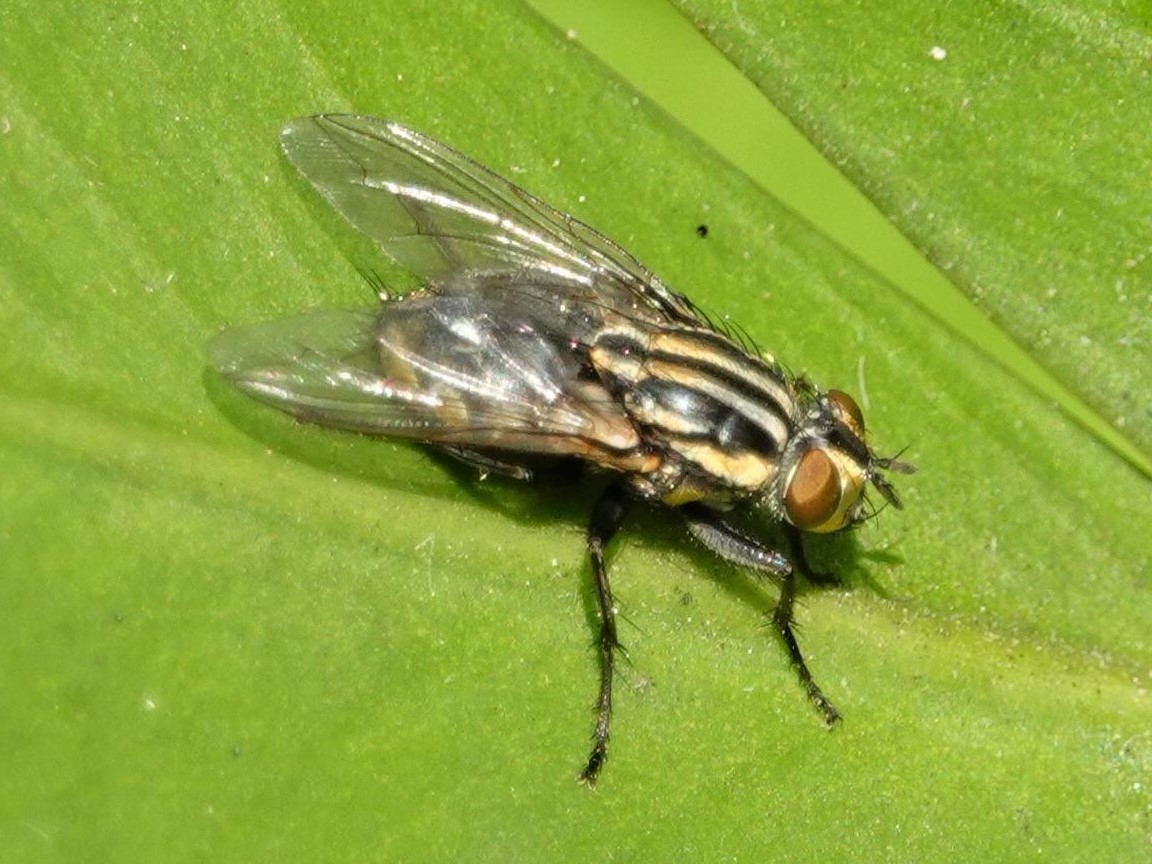
- Oxysarcodexia varia

Scientific classification
- Kingdom: Animalia
- Phylum: Arthropoda
- Class: Insecta
- Order: Diptera
- Family: Sarcophagidae
- Subfamily: Sarcophaginae
- Genus: Oxysarcodexia; Townsend, 1917

Type species
- Oxysarcodexia peltata Aldrich, 1916

Synonyms
- Amesothyrsus Enderlein, 1928; Apelophyla Hall, 1938; Asioboettcheria Verves, 2001; Dasyproctia Enderlein, 1928; Hybopygia Enderlein, 1928; Osysarcodexia Lopes & Tibana, 1991; Xarcophaga Dodge, 1968

= Oxysarcodexia =

Genus of flies

Oxysarcodexia is a genus of flies belonging to the family Sarcophagidae.

The species of this genus are found in Australia and America.

== Species ==
- Oxysarcodexia admixta (Lopes, 1933)
- Oxysarcodexia adunca Lopes, 1975
- Oxysarcodexia afficta (Wulp, 1895)
- Oxysarcodexia alectoris Souza, Pape & Thyssen, 2020
- Oxysarcodexia amorosa (Schiner, 1868)
- Oxysarcodexia angrensis (Lopes, 1933)
- Oxysarcodexia angulosa Souza, Pape & Thyssen, 2020
- Oxysarcodexia ariozanoi Souza, Pape & Thyssen, 2020
- Oxysarcodexia augusta Lopes, 1946
- Oxysarcodexia aura (Hall, 1937)
- Oxysarcodexia avuncula (Lopes, 1933)
- Oxysarcodexia bakeri (Aldrich, 1916)
- Oxysarcodexia berlai Lopes, 1975
- Oxysarcodexia berthet Dufek & Mulieri, 2017
- Oxysarcodexia bicolor Lopes, 1946
- Oxysarcodexia bikini Dodge, 1966
- Oxysarcodexia carvalhoi Lopes, 1946
- Oxysarcodexia catica Souza & Buenaventura, 2016
- Oxysarcodexia chaetopygialis (Williston, 1896)
- Oxysarcodexia cingarus (Aldrich, 1916)
- Oxysarcodexia cocais Carvalho-Filho, Sousa & Esposito, 2017
- Oxysarcodexia comparilis (Reinhard, 1939)
- Oxysarcodexia conclausa (Walker, 1861)
- Oxysarcodexia confusa Lopes, 1946
- Oxysarcodexia corolla Dodge, 1965
- Oxysarcodexia culmiforceps Dodge, 1966
- Oxysarcodexia culminata (Aldrich, 1916)
- Oxysarcodexia cyanea Lopes, 1975
- Oxysarcodexia cyaniforceps (Hall, 1933)
- Oxysarcodexia diana (Lopes, 1933)
- Oxysarcodexia digitata Menezes, Santos & Patiu, 2020
- Oxysarcodexia dorisae Dodge, 1965
- Oxysarcodexia eberti Lopes & Tibana, 1987
- Oxysarcodexia edwardsi Lopes, 1946
- Oxysarcodexia favorabilis (Lopes, 1935)
- Oxysarcodexia festiva Lopes & Tibana, 1987
- Oxysarcodexia flavipes Lopes & Tibana, 1987
- Oxysarcodexia floricola Lopes, 1975
- Oxysarcodexia fluminensis Lopes, 1946
- Oxysarcodexia fraterna Lopes, 1946
- Oxysarcodexia fringidea (Curran & Walley, 1934)
- Oxysarcodexia galeata (Aldrich, 1916)
- Oxysarcodexia graminifolia Souza, Pape & Thyssen, 2020
- Oxysarcodexia grandis Lopes, 1946
- Oxysarcodexia ibera Dufek & Mulieri, 2017
- Oxysarcodexia inflata Lopes, 1975
- Oxysarcodexia injuncta (Walker, 1858)
- Oxysarcodexia insolita Lopes, 1946
- Oxysarcodexia intona (Curran & Walley, 1934)
- Oxysarcodexia jamesi Dodge, 1968
- Oxysarcodexia laclaricola Souza & Buenaventura, 2016
- Oxysarcodexia liliarum Souza & Buenaventura, 2016
- Oxysarcodexia maiae Souza, Pape & Thyssen, 2020
- Oxysarcodexia major Lopes, 1946
- Oxysarcodexia marina (Hall, 1938)
- Oxysarcodexia meridionalis (Engel, 1931)
- Oxysarcodexia mineirensis Souza & Paseto, 2015
- Oxysarcodexia mitifica Lopes, 1953
- Oxysarcodexia molitor (Curran & Walley, 1934)
- Oxysarcodexia morretesi Tibana & Mello, 1983
- Oxysarcodexia neivai (Mattos, 1919)
- Oxysarcodexia nitida Soares & Mello-Patiu, 2010
- Oxysarcodexia notata Soares & Mello-Patiu, 2010
- Oxysarcodexia occulta Lopes, 1946
- Oxysarcodexia ochripyga (Wulp, 1896)
- Oxysarcodexia orbitalis Dodge, 1966
- Oxysarcodexia pallisteri Dodge, 1966
- Oxysarcodexia parva Lopes, 1946
- Oxysarcodexia paulistanensis (Mattos, 1919)
- Oxysarcodexia peltata (Aldrich, 1916)
- Oxysarcodexia perneta (Walker, 1861)
- Oxysarcodexia peruviana (Lopes, 1975)
- Oxysarcodexia petropolitana Lopes, 1975
- Oxysarcodexia plebeja Lopes, 1946
- Oxysarcodexia ramosa (Reinhard, 1939)
- Oxysarcodexia rimata Souza, Pape & Thyssen, 2020
- Oxysarcodexia riograndensis Lopes, 1946
- Oxysarcodexia sarcinata Lopes, 1953
- Oxysarcodexia similata Lopes & Tibana, 1987
- Oxysarcodexia simplicoides (Lopes, 1933)
- Oxysarcodexia terminalis (Wiedemann, 1830)
- Oxysarcodexia thornax (Walker, 1849)
- Oxysarcodexia timida (Aldrich, 1916)
- Oxysarcodexia trivialis (Wulp, 1896)
- Oxysarcodexia varia (Walker, 1836)
- Oxysarcodexia ventricosa (Wulp, 1896)
- Oxysarcodexia villosa Lopes, 1946
- Oxysarcodexia vittata (Walker, 1836)
- Oxysarcodexia wygodzinskyi Lopes & Tibana, 1987
- Oxysarcodexia xon (Dodge, 1968)
- Oxysarcodexia zayasi Dodge, 1956
