= Paedarium =

Scientific classification
- Kingdom: Animalia
- Phylum: Arthropoda
- Class: Insecta
- Order: Diptera
- Family: Tachinidae
- Subfamily: Dexiinae
- Tribe: Voriini
- Genus: Paedarium; Aldrich, 1926

Type species
- Paedarium parvum Aldrich, 1926

Synonyms
- Vorialia Curran, 1934

Genus of flies

Paedarium is a genus of flies in the family Tachinidae.

== Species ==
- Paedarium neotropicum (Curran, 1926)
- Paedarium parvum Aldrich, 1926
- Paedarium punctipenne (Walker, 1858)
