= Dexosarcophaga wyatti =

Scientific classification
- Domain: Eukaryota
- Kingdom: Animalia
- Phylum: Arthropoda
- Class: Insecta
- Order: Diptera
- Family: Sarcophagidae
- Genus: Dexosarcophaga
- Species: D. wyatti

Binomial name
- Dexosarcophaga wyatti Mello-Patiu & Pape, 2000

Species of fly

Dexosarcophaga wyatti is a species of fly from Guyana.
