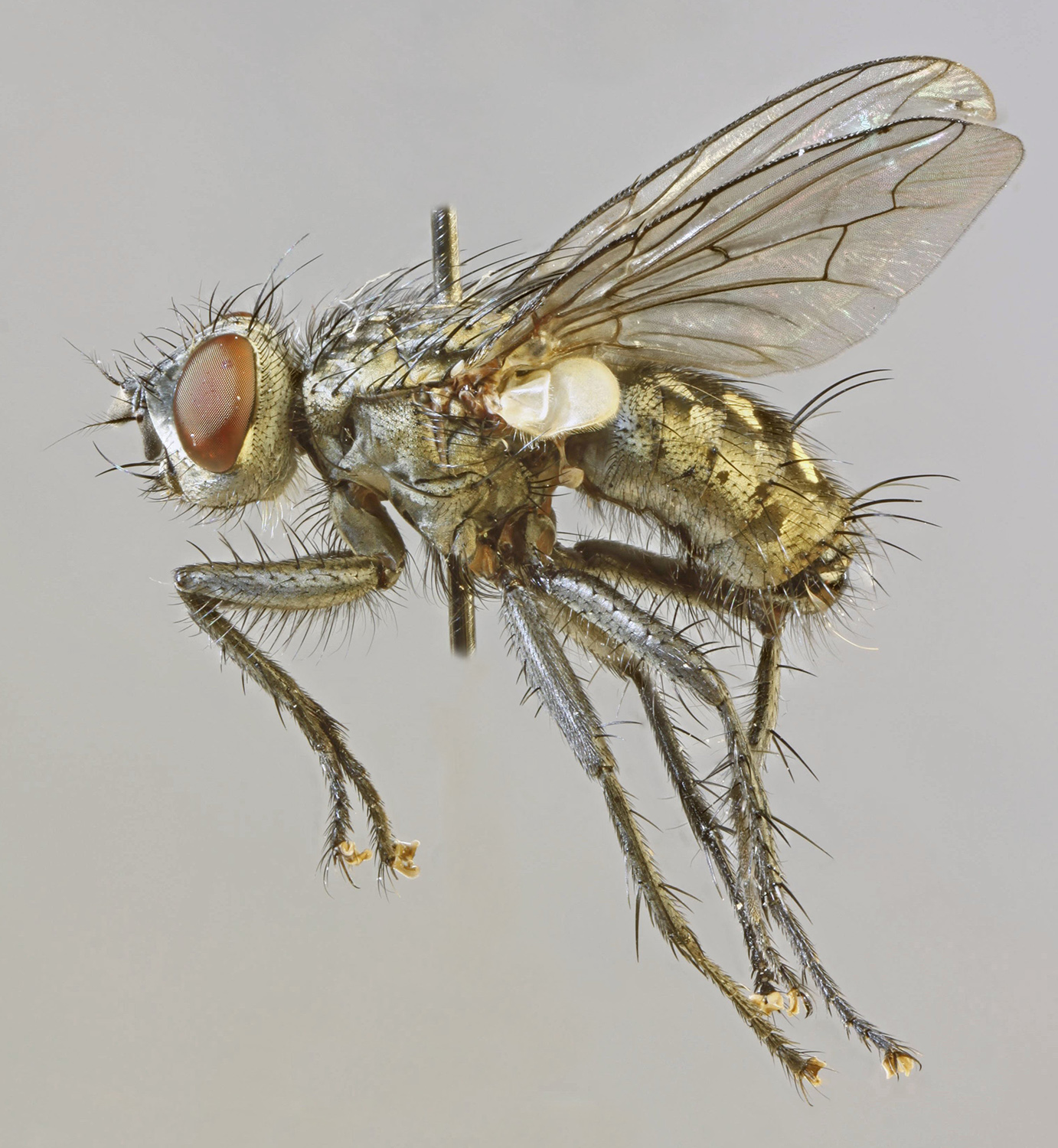
- Sarcophaga incisilobata North Wales

Scientific classification
- Kingdom: Animalia
- Phylum: Arthropoda
- Class: Insecta
- Order: Diptera
- Family: Sarcophagidae
- Subfamily: Sarcophaginae
- Genus: Sarcophaga
- Species: S. incisilobata

Binomial name
- Sarcophaga incisilobata Pandellé, 1896

= Sarcophaga incisilobata =

Species of fly

Sarcophaga incisilobata is a species of fly in the family Sarcophagidae. It is found in the Palearctic.
