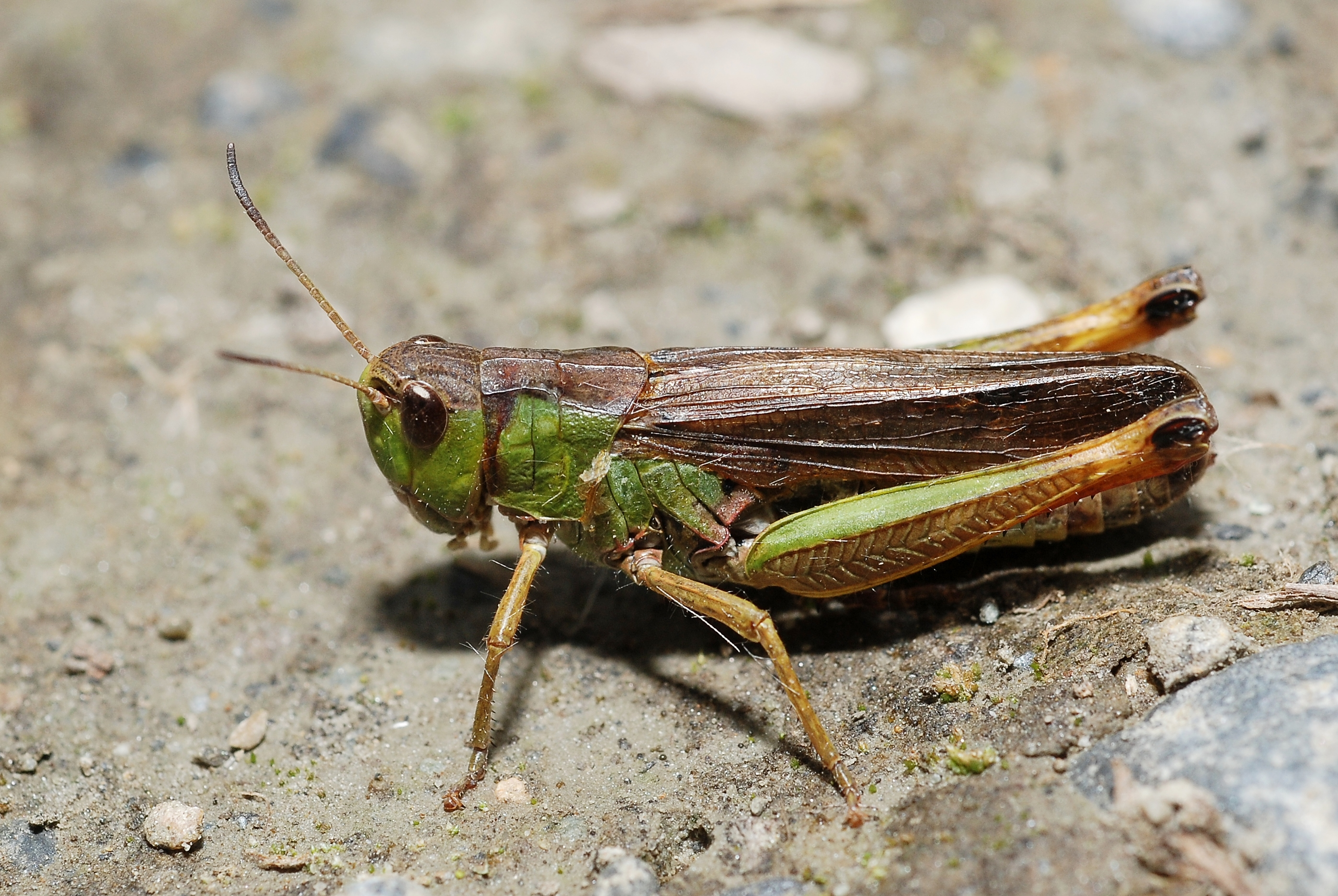
- Stauroderus scalaris

Scientific classification
- Kingdom: Animalia
- Phylum: Arthropoda
- Clade: Pancrustacea
- Class: Insecta
- Order: Orthoptera
- Suborder: Caelifera
- Family: Acrididae
- Subfamily: Gomphocerinae
- Tribe: Gomphocerini
- Genus: Stauroderus; Bolívar, 1897

= Stauroderus =

Genus of grasshoppers

Stauroderus is a genus of slant-faced grasshoppers in the family Acrididae. There are three described species in Stauroderus, found in the Palearctic realm.

== Species ==
The Orthoptera Species File lists:

1. Stauroderus campestris (Stål, 1861)
2. Stauroderus scalaris (Fischer von Waldheim, 1846) - type species (as Oedipoda scalaris Fischer von Waldheim = S. scalaris scalaris, one of 3 subspecies: by subsequent designation)
3. Stauroderus yunnaneus (Uvarov, 1925)
