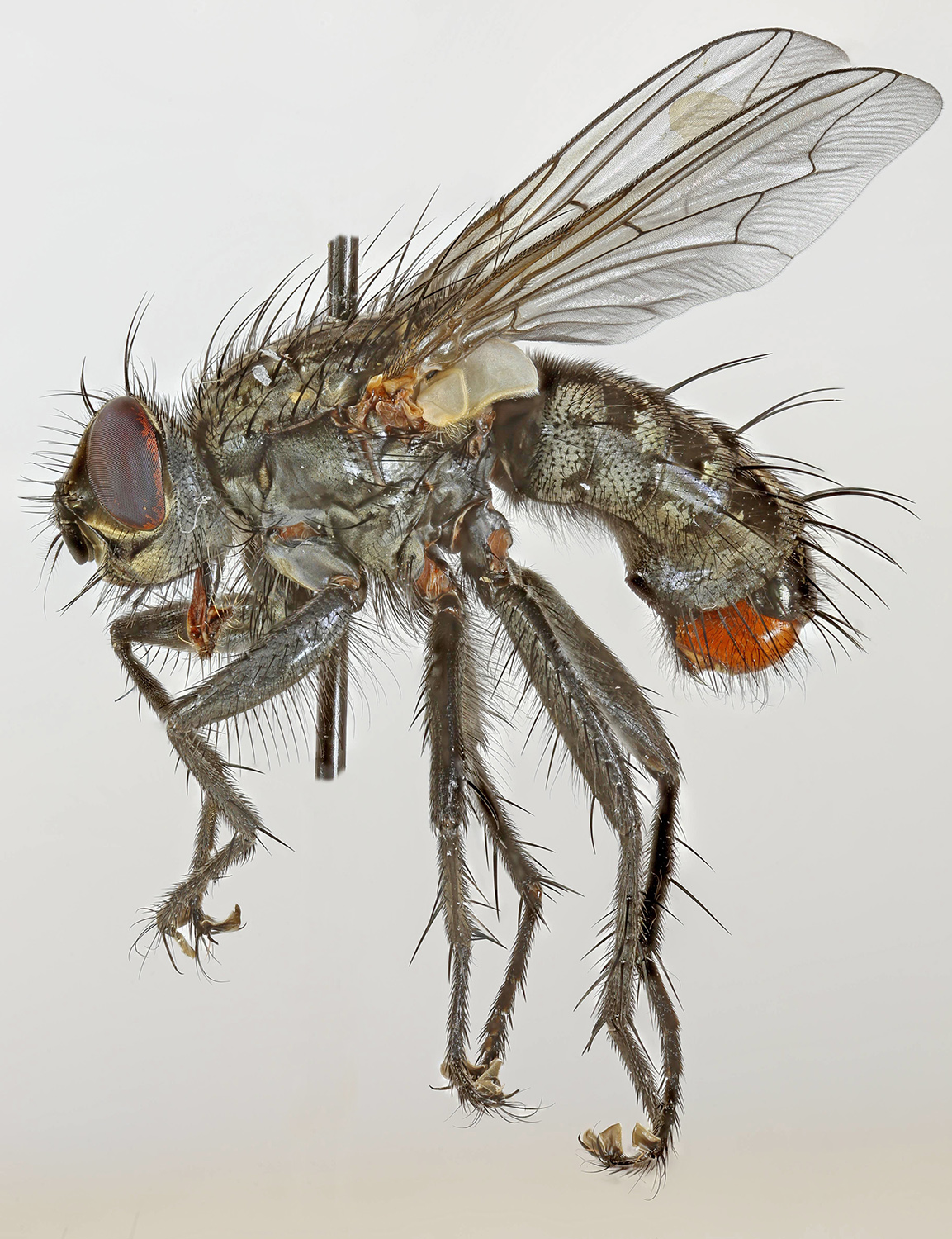
- Sarcophaga vagans North Wales

Scientific classification
- Kingdom: Animalia
- Phylum: Arthropoda
- Class: Insecta
- Order: Diptera
- Family: Sarcophagidae
- Subfamily: Sarcophaginae
- Genus: Sarcophaga
- Species: S. vagans

Binomial name
- Sarcophaga vagans Meigen, 1826

Synonyms
- Sarcophaga frenata Pandellé, 1896

= Sarcophaga vagans =

Species of fly

Sarcophaga vagans is a species of fly in the family Sarcophagidae. It is found in the Palearctic.
