= Ravinia latisetosa =

Scientific classification
- Domain: Eukaryota
- Kingdom: Animalia
- Phylum: Arthropoda
- Class: Insecta
- Order: Diptera
- Family: Sarcophagidae
- Genus: Ravinia
- Species: R. latisetosa

Binomial name
- Ravinia latisetosa Parker, 1914

Species of insect

Ravinia latisetosa is a species of flesh fly in the family Sarcophagidae.
