= Boettcheria =

Scientific classification
- Domain: Eukaryota
- Kingdom: Animalia
- Phylum: Arthropoda
- Class: Insecta
- Order: Diptera
- Family: Sarcophagidae
- Subfamily: Sarcophaginae
- Genus: Boettcheria; Parker, 1914

Type species
- Boettcheria latisterna Parker, 1914

Synonyms
- Melanophyto Townsend, 1916; Parasarcodexia Townsend, 1918; Winthemiola Dodge, 1967; Boettcheriodes Lopes, 1988

Genus of flies

Boettcheria is a genus of flesh flies in the family Sarcophagidae. There are at least 20 described species in Boettcheria.

== Species ==
These 28 species belong to the genus Boettcheria:

- B. arnaudi Lopes, 1950^{c g}
- B. aurifera Lopes, 1950^{c g}
- B. bisetosa Parker, 1914^{i c g b}
- B. calceata (Dodge, 1967)^{c g}
- B. cimbicis (Townsend, 1892)
- B. cubana Lopes, 1950^{i c g}
- B. dentata Dodge, 1966^{c g}
- B. elegans Lopes, 1975^{c g}
- B. holmani Rohdendorf, 1971^{c g}
- B. latisterna Parker, 1914^{i c g}
- B. litorosa (Reinhard, 1947)^{i c g}
- B. maerens (Townsend, 1916)^{c g}
- B. marstoni Dodge, 1966^{c g}
- B. melanderi Dodge, 1967^{i c g}
- B. mexicana Lopes, 1950^{c g}
- B. mundelli Blanchard, 1939^{c g}
- B. parkeri (Aldrich, 1916)^{c g}
- B. parkeriana Lopes, 1976^{c g}
- B. peruviana Lopes, 1950^{c g}
- B. petersoni Lopes, 1988^{c g}
- B. praevolans (Wulp, 1896)^{i c g}
- B. pugetensis Dodge, 1967^{i c g}
- B. pyrrhopyga (Hall, 1933)^{c g}
- B. retroversa (Lopes, 1935)^{c g}
- B. similis Lopes, 1946^{c g}
- B. solo Pape, 1989^{c g}
- B. styx Pape & Dahlem, 1998^{c g}
- B. taurus (Aldrich, 1916)^{c g}

Data sources: i = ITIS, c = Catalogue of Life, g = GBIF, b = Bugguide.net
