= Helicobia =

Scientific classification
- Domain: Eukaryota
- Kingdom: Animalia
- Phylum: Arthropoda
- Class: Insecta
- Order: Diptera
- Family: Sarcophagidae
- Tribe: Sarcodexiini
- Genus: Helicobia; Coquillett, 1895

Type species
- Sarcophaga helicis Townsend, 1892

Genus of insects

Helicobia is a genus of flesh flies in the family Sarcophagidae. There are at least 30 described species in Helicobia.

== Species ==
- H. ajax Dodge, 1968
- H. alvarengai Tibana, 1976
- H. aurescens (Townsend, 1927)
- H. bethae Dodge, 1965
- H. biplagiata Dodge, 1966
- H. borgmeieri Lopes, 1939
- H. cearensis Tibana, 1976
- H. chapadensis Tibana & Lopes, 1985
- H. cuencana Tibana, 1988
- H. debilis (Wulp, 1895)
- H. edwardsi (Hall, 1937)
- H. giovannolii Dodge, 1965
- H. gregoriana Rohdendorf, 1971
- H. haydeni Dodge, 1965
- H. iheringi Lopes, 1939
- H. lagunicula (Hall, 1933)
- H. lopesi Tibana, 1989
- H. lubera (Brethes, 1920)
- H. morionella (Aldrich, 1930)
- H. neglecta Lopes, 1946
- H. penai Tibana, 1976
- H. pilifera Lopes, 1939
- H. pilipleura Lopes, 1939
- H. providencia Dodge, 1965
- H. rabbi Dodge, 1965
- H. rapax (Walker, 1849)
- H. resinata (Hall, 1933)
- H. serrata Tibana, 1988
- H. setinervis Lopes, 1939
- H. stellata (Wulp, 1895)
- H. surrubea (Wulp, 1895)
- H. tinajillensis Tibana, 1988
- H. tridens (Townsend, 1915)
- H. troyana Tibana, 1988
- H. tulcana Tibana, 1988
