= Paedarium punctipenne =

Scientific classification
- Kingdom: Animalia
- Phylum: Arthropoda
- Class: Insecta
- Order: Diptera
- Family: Tachinidae
- Subfamily: Dexiinae
- Tribe: Voriini
- Genus: Paedarium
- Species: P. punctipenne

Binomial name
- Paedarium punctipenne (Walker, 1858)

Synonyms
- Sarcophaga punctipennis Walker, 1858

Species of fly

Paedarium punctipenne is a species of fly in the family Tachinidae.

== Distribution ==
Colombia.
