= Sarcophaga gnu =

Scientific classification
- Kingdom: Animalia
- Phylum: Arthropoda
- Class: Insecta
- Order: Diptera
- Family: Sarcophagidae
- Genus: Sarcophaga
- Subgenus: Afrothyrsocnema
- Species: S. gnu

Binomial name
- Sarcophaga gnu Curran, 1934

Species of fly

Sarcophaga gnu is a species of fly in the family Sarcophagidae. It is found in Zaire in the Afrotropical region.
