= Sarcophaga arno =

Scientific classification
- Kingdom: Animalia
- Phylum: Arthropoda
- Class: Insecta
- Order: Diptera
- Family: Sarcophagidae
- Genus: Sarcophaga
- Subgenus: Bercaea
- Species: S. arno

Binomial name
- Sarcophaga arno Curran, 1934

Synonyms
- Sarcophaga arnoides Patton & Ho, 1938; Sarcophaga milloti Zumpt, 1951; Sarcophaga lurida Zumpt, 1953

Species of fly

Sarcophaga arno is a species of fly in the family Sarcophagidae. It is found in the Afrotropical region.
