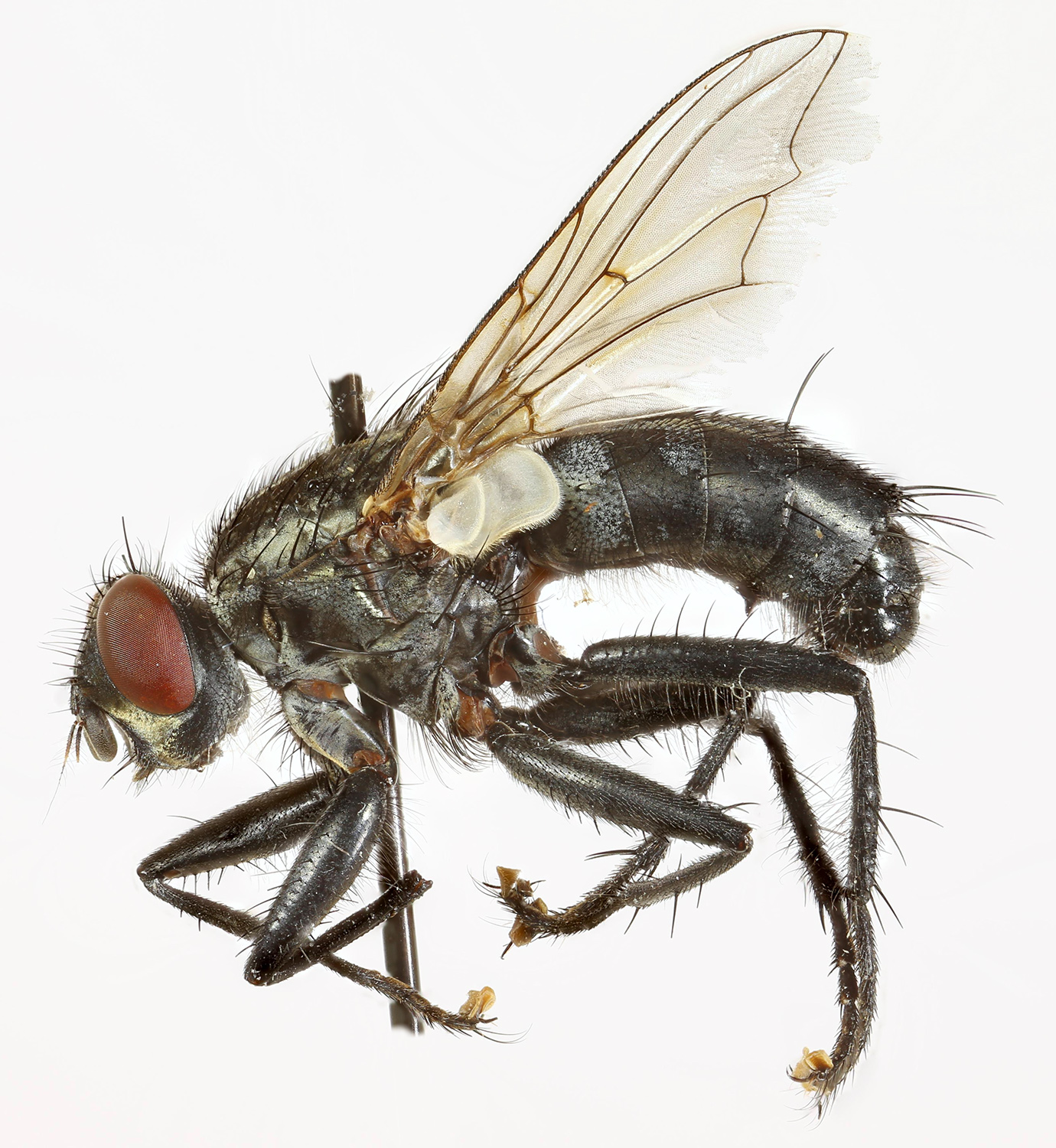
- Sarcophaga aratrix North Wales

Scientific classification
- Kingdom: Animalia
- Phylum: Arthropoda
- Class: Insecta
- Order: Diptera
- Family: Sarcophagidae
- Genus: Sarcophaga
- Species: S. aratrix

Binomial name
- Sarcophaga aratrix Pandelle, 1896

= Sarcophaga aratrix =

Species of fly

Sarcophaga aratrix is a species of fly in the family Sarcophagidae. It is found in the Palearctic.
