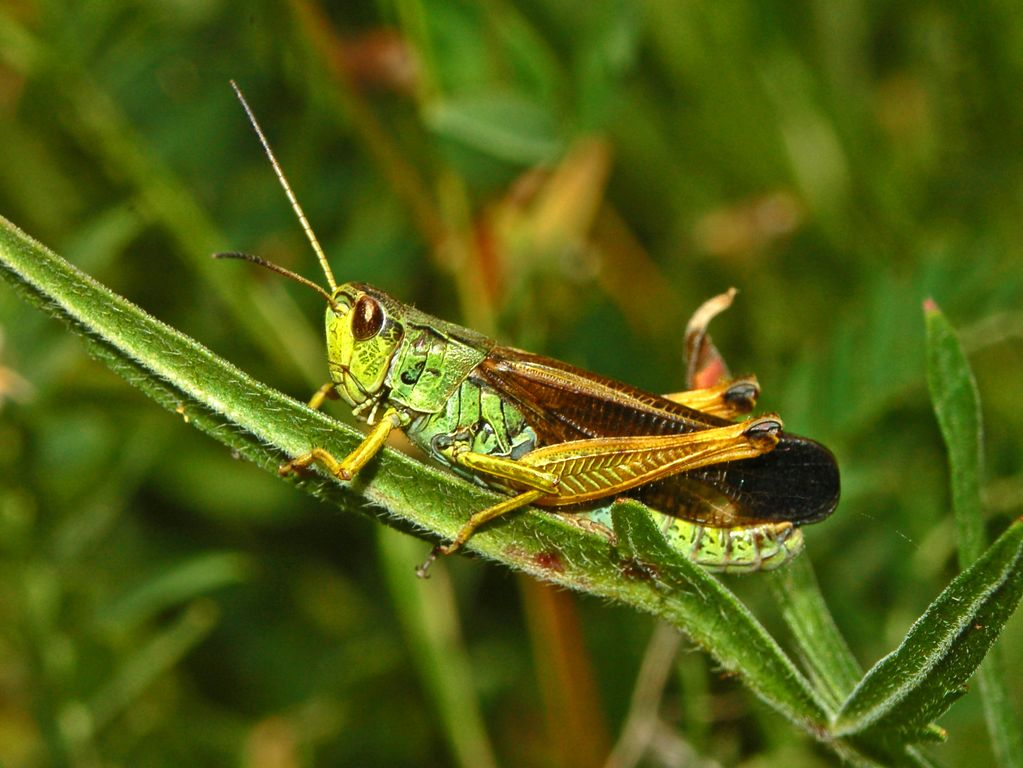
- Stauroderus scalaris, male
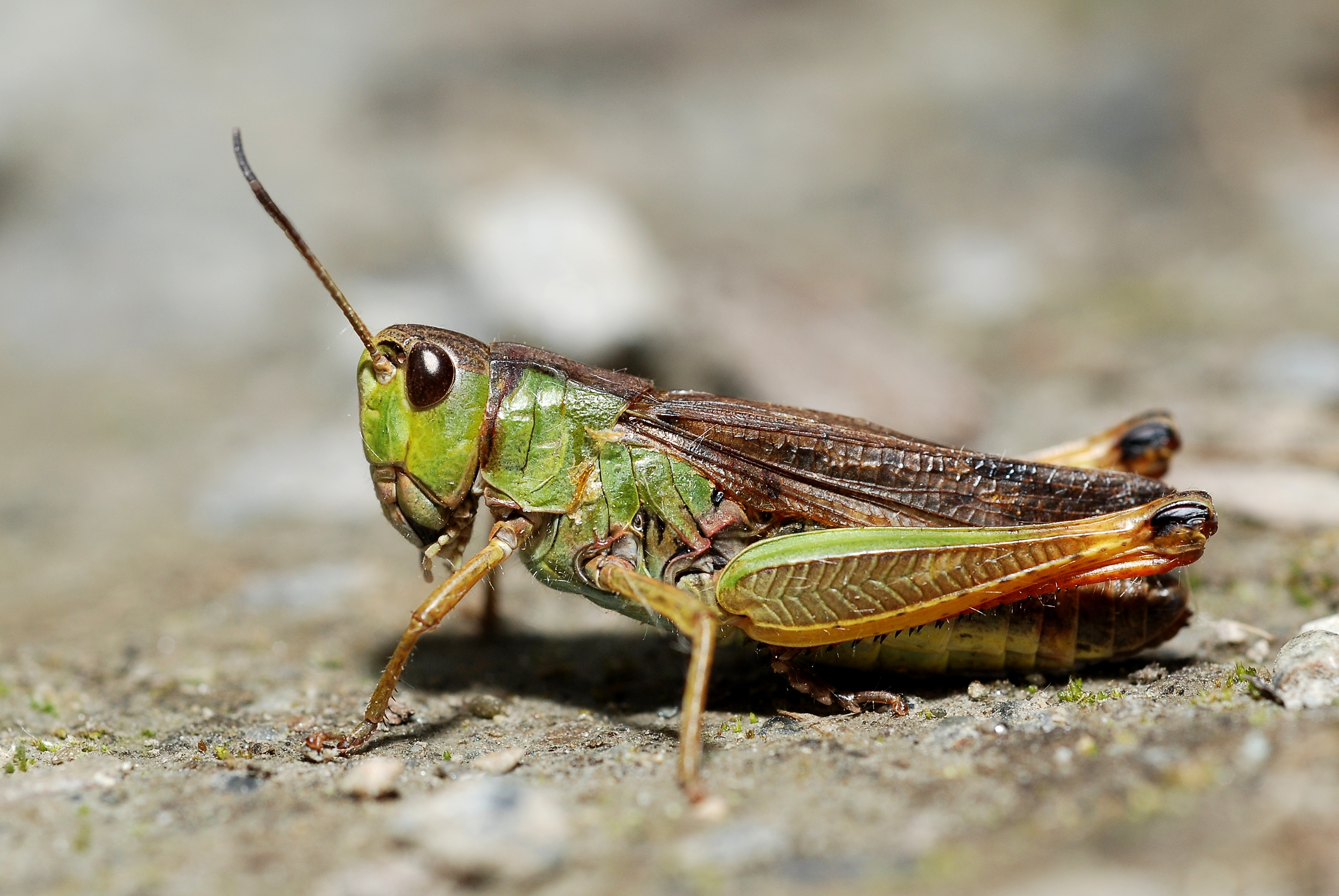
- Female

Scientific classification
- Domain: Eukaryota
- Kingdom: Animalia
- Phylum: Arthropoda
- Class: Insecta
- Order: Orthoptera
- Suborder: Caelifera
- Family: Acrididae
- Subfamily: Gomphocerinae
- Tribe: Gomphocerini
- Genus: Stauroderus
- Species: S. scalaris

Binomial name
- Stauroderus scalaris (Fischer von Waldheim, 1846)

Synonyms
- Chorthippus scalaris (Fischer von Waldheim, 1846)

= Stauroderus scalaris =

Species of grasshopper

Stauroderus scalaris, the large mountain grasshopper, is a species of 'short-horned grasshoppers' belonging to the family Acrididae subfamily Gomphocerinae.

== Subspecies ==
Stauroderus includes the following subspecies:

- Stauroderus scalaris demavendi Popov, G.B., 1951
- Stauroderus scalaris scalaris (Fischer von Waldheim, 1846)
- Stauroderus scalaris znojkoi (Miram, 1938)

== Description ==
The adult males grow up to 18–20 millimetres (0.71–0.79 in) long, while the females reach 24–27 millimetres (0.94–1.06 in) of length. It is the largest species of grasshopper in Europe. The basic coloration of the body varies from pale or bright green to yellow, with dark-brownish wings and tegmina. Femora of hind legs vary from yellow to reddish. In the males median and ulnar wing cells are quite large, with parallel veins. The adults usually live in colonies and the males emit whirring stridulations to attract females.

These grasshoppers can be encountered from July through September especially in high-altitude alpine meadows and pastures.

Close-Up of a Stauroderus scalaris

== Distribution ==
This species is present in most of Europe, in the Near East, and in the eastern Palearctic realm.
