= Sarcophaga burungae =

Scientific classification
- Kingdom: Animalia
- Phylum: Arthropoda
- Class: Insecta
- Order: Diptera
- Family: Sarcophagidae
- Genus: Sarcophaga
- Subgenus: Bercaea
- Species: S. burungae

Binomial name
- Sarcophaga burungae Curran, 1934

Species of fly

Sarcophaga burungae is a species of fly in the family Sarcophagidae. It is found in the Afrotropical region.
