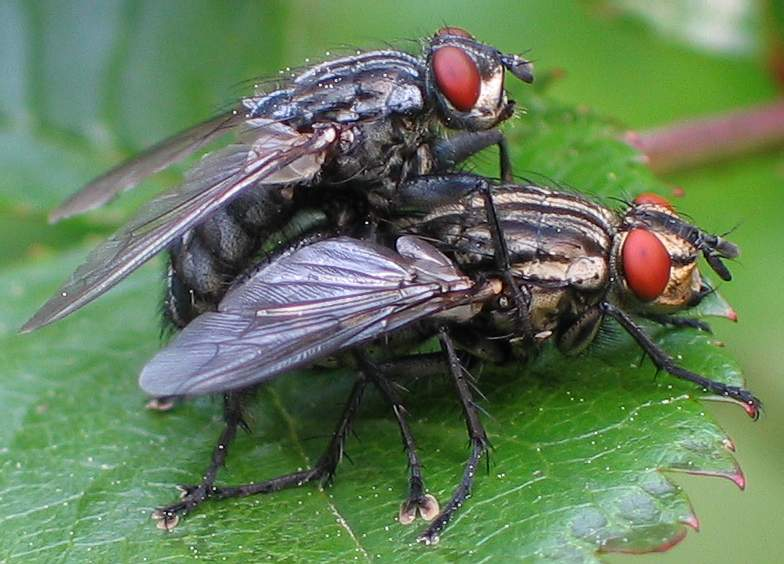
- Sarcophaga carnaria

Scientific classification
- Kingdom: Animalia
- Phylum: Arthropoda
- Class: Insecta
- Order: Diptera
- Family: Sarcophagidae
- Subfamily: Sarcophaginae; Macquart, 1835

= Sarcophaginae =

Subfamily of insects (true flies)

Sarcophaginae is a subfamily of flesh flies (insects in the family Sarcophagidae). There are at least 60 genera and 250 described species in Sarcophaginae.

== Genera ==
- Archimimus Reinhard, 1952
- Argoravinia Townsend, 1917
- Austrophyto Lopes, 1989
- Bahamiola Dodge, 1965
- Blaesoxipha Loew, 1861 (grasshopper maggots)
- Boettcheria Parker, 1914
- Camptops
- Chrysagria
- Cistudinomyia
- Colcondamyia
- Comasarcophaga
- Cucullomyia
- Dexosarcophaga Townsend, 1917
- Emblemasoma
- Erucophaga
- Euboettcheria
- Fletcherimyia Townsend, 1917
- Harpagopyga
- Helicobia Coquillett, 1895
- Kellymyia
- Komisca Kurahashi & Samerjai, 2018
- Lepidodexia Brauer & von Bergenstamm, 1891
- Liopygia
- Liosarcophaga
- Mantidophaga
- Mecynocorpus Roback, 1954
- Mehria
- Metoposarcophaga
- Microcerella Macquart, 1861
- Neobellieria
- Neophyto
- Neosarcophaga
- Omarisca Kurahashi, Tan, Leh, 2021
- Oppiopsis
- Opsophyto
- Oxysarcodexia Townsend, 1917
- Paraphrissopoda
- Pierretia
- Protodexia
- Rafaelia Townsend, 1917
- Ravinia Robineau-Desvoidy, 1863
- Retrocitomyia Lopes, 1982
- Robineauella
- Sarcodexia Townsend, 1892
- Sarcofahrtiopsis Hall, 1933
- Sarcophaga Meigen, 1826
- Sarcophagula
- Sarcotachinella
- Sarothromyia
- Sarraceniomyia
- Servaisia
- Speciosia
- Spirobolomyia
- Stenaulacotheca
- Sthenopyga
- Thelylepticocnema
- Thyrsocnema Enderlein, 1861
- Titanogrypa
- Tolucamyia Dodge, 1965
- Tylomyia
- Wohlfahrtiopsis Townsend, 1917
- Zulisca Kurahashi, Tan, Leh, 2021
