= Knemidokoptes pilae =

Scientific classification
- Kingdom: Animalia
- Phylum: Arthropoda
- Subphylum: Chelicerata
- Class: Arachnida
- Order: Sarcoptiformes
- Family: Epidermoptidae
- Genus: Knemidokoptes
- Species: K. pilae

Binomial name
- Knemidokoptes pilae Lavoipierre & Griffiths (1951)

Species of mite

Knemidokoptes pilae, or the scaly face mite, is a mite which parasitises the beaks of psittacines, particularly budgerigars, causing a mange known as 'scaly face'.

== Morphology ==
K. pilae are roundish-oval mites. The males are up to 220 μm long and about 150 μm wide, females up to 356 μm long and about 300 μm wide. The four pairs of legs are short and stubby in shape and have five segments. At the ends of the extremities, males have unjointed grippers and suckers, while females have claws.

== Life ==
K. pilae lives off the substance of the beak, which it dissolves by means of a keratinase. They live primarily in the cere and at the base of the beak of the infected birds. They inhabit a single host throughout their life cycle; infection of new hosts occurs by contact.

The viviparous females drill tunnels in the epidermis where they give birth to six-legged larvae, which develop through two eight-legged nymphal stages from the second of which the adults molt.
