= Veterinary parasitology =

Study of animal parasites

Veterinary parasitology is a branch of veterinary medicine that deals with the study of morphology, life-cycle, pathogenesis, diagnosis, treatment, and control of eukaryotic invertebrates of the kingdom Animalia and the taxon Protozoa that depend upon other invertebrates and higher vertebrates for their propagation, nutrition, and metabolism without necessarily causing the death of their hosts. Modern parasitology focuses on responses of animal hosts to parasitic invasion. Parasites of domestic animals, (livestock and pet animals), as well as wildlife animals are considered. Data obtained from parasitological research in animals helps in veterinary practice and improves animal breeding. The major goal of veterinary parasitology is to protect animals and improve their health, but because a number of animal parasites are transmitted to humans, veterinary parasitology is also important for public health.

== Diagnostic methods ==
Various methods are used to identify parasites in animals, using feces, blood, and tissue samples from the host animal.

=== Coprological ===
Coprological examinations involve examining the feces of animals to identify and count parasite eggs. Some common methods include fecal flotation and sedimentation to separate eggs from fecal matter. Others include the McMaster method, which uses a special two-chamber slide that allows parasite eggs to be more clearly visible and easily counted. It is most commonly used to monitor parasites in horses and other grazing and livestock animals. The Baermann method is similar but requires more specialized equipment and more time and is typically used to diagnose lungworm and threadworm.

=== Haematological ===
Haematological examinations involve examining the blood of animals to determine the presence of parasites. Blood parasites tend to inhabit the erythrocytes or white blood cells and are most likely to be detected during the acute phase of infection. Veterinary parasitologists use blood smears, which involve placing a drop of blood onto a slide and spreading it over the surface in a thin film in order to examine it under a microscope. The blood is stained with a dye in order for the cells to be easily distinguished.

=== Histopathological ===
Histopathological examinations involve examining tissue samples from animals. A small slice of the organ suspected of being infected by parasites is mounted on a slide, stained, and examined under a microscope.

Though not technically considered a histopathological technique, skin scraping – which involves taking a small sample of the epidermal cells of a dog, cat, or other household pet – is commonly used to detect the presence of mites.

=== Immunological ===
Immunological examinations, such as indirect immunofluorescence, ELISA, Immunoblotting (Western blot), and Complement fixation test are methods of identifying different kinds of parasites by detecting the presence of their antigens on or within the parasite itself. These diagnostic methods are used in conjunction with coprological examinations for more specific identification of different parasite species in fecal samples.

=== Molecular biological ===
Molecular biological methods involve studying the DNA of the parasite in order to identify it. PCR and RFLP are used to detect and amplify parasite DNA found in the feces, blood, or tissue of the host. These techniques are very sensitive, which is useful for diagnosing parasites even when they are present in very low numbers; they are also useful for identifying parasites not only in large animal hosts but smaller insect vectors.

== Divisions of veterinary parasitology ==
=== Veterinary protozoology ===
Veterinary protozoology is focused on protozoa with veterinary relevance. Examples of protozoan parasites:

- Babesia divergens
- Balantidium coli
- Besnoitia besnoiti
- Cryptosporidium parvum
- Eimeria acervulina
- Eimeria tenella
- Giardia lamblia (also known as Giardia duodenalis)
- Hammondia hammondi
- Histomonas meleagridis
- Isospora canis
- Leishmania donovani
- Leishmania infantum
- Neospora caninum
- Toxoplasma gondii
- Trichomonas gallinae
- Tritrichomonas foetus
- Trypanosoma brucei
- Trypanosoma equiperdum

=== Veterinary helminthology ===
Veterinary helminthology is focused on veterinary important helminth parasites, for example:

- Ancylostoma caninum
- Ancylostoma ceylanicum
- Ancylostoma duodenale
- Ascaris suum
- Dicrocoelium dendriticum
- Dictyocaulus viviparus
- Dipylidium caninum
- Echinococcus granulosus
- Fasciola hepatica
- Fascioloides magna
- Habronema species
- Haemonchus contortus
- Metastrongylus
- Muellerius capillaris
- Ostertagia ostertagi
- Paragonimus westermani
- Schistosoma bovis
- Strongyloides species
- Strongylus vulgaris
- Syngamus trachea (Gapeworm)
- Taenia pisiformis
- Taenia saginata
- Taenia solium
- Toxascaris leonina
- Toxocara canis
- Toxocara cati
- Trichinella spiralis
- Trichobilharzia regenti
- Trichostrongylus species
- Trichuris suis
- Trichuris vulpis

=== Veterinary entomology (arachnoentomology) ===
Veterinary entomology is focused on important arachnids, insects, and crustaceans. Some examples include:

- Caligus species
- Cimex colombarius
- Cimex lectularius
- Culex pipiens
- Culicoides imicola
- Demodex bovis
- Dermacentor reticulatus
- Gasterophilus intestinalis
- Haematobia irritans
- Hypoderma bovis
- Ixodes ricinus
- Knemidocoptes mutans (causing the disease scaly leg)
- Lepeophtheirus salmonis (sea louse)
- Lucilia sericata
- Musca domestica
- Nosema apis
- Notoedres cati
- Oestrus ovis
- Otodectes cynotis
- Phlebotomus species
- Psoroptes ovis
- Pulex irritans
- Rhipicephalus sanguineus
- Sarcoptes equi
- Sarcophaga carnaria
- Tabanus atratus
- Triatoma species
- Ctenocephalides canis
- Ctenocephalides felis
