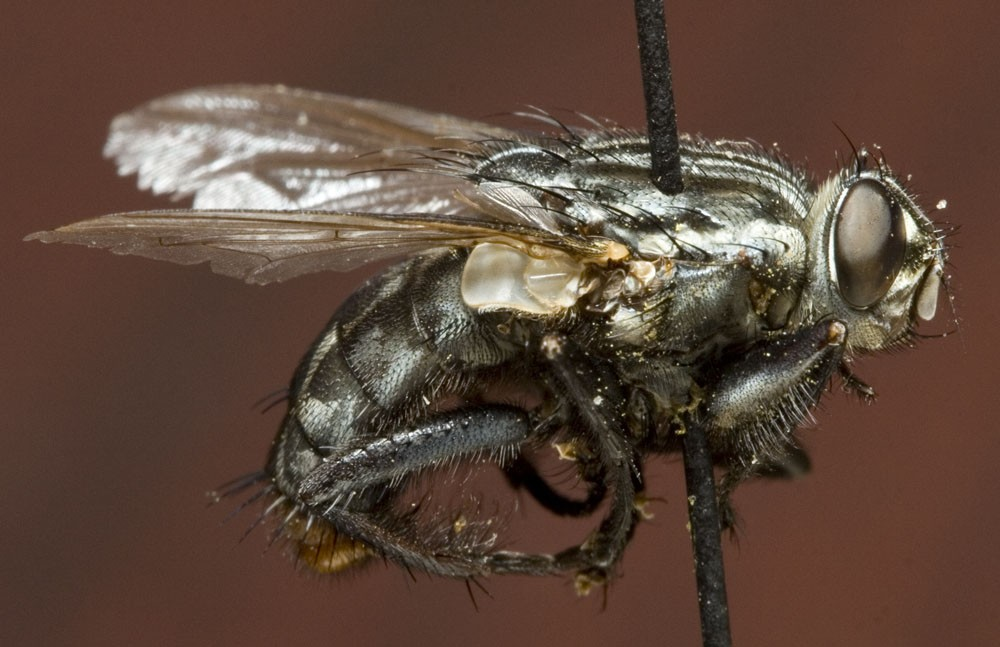

Scientific classification
- Kingdom: Animalia
- Phylum: Arthropoda
- Clade: Pancrustacea
- Class: Insecta
- Order: Diptera
- Family: Sarcophagidae
- Subfamily: Sarcophaginae
- Genus: Sarcophaga
- Species: S. bullata

Binomial name
- Sarcophaga bullata (Parker, 1916)

Synonyms
- Sarcophaga bison Aldrich, 1916; Neobellieria bullata Parker, 1916

= Sarcophaga bullata =

Species of fly

Sarcophaga bullata, or the grey flesh fly, is a species of fly belonging to the family Sarcophagidae. It varies in size from small to large, 8 to 17 millimeters in length and is very similar in appearance and behavior to a closely related species, Sarcophaga haemorrhoidalis. S. bullata is a common scavenger species in the Eastern United States, but is found throughout the Nearctic region. Identification down to the species level in the family Sarcophagidae is notably difficult and relies primarily on the male genitalia. Though limited information is available regarding S. bullata, it has gained increasing recognition in the field of forensic entomology as a forensically relevant fly species, as it may be among the first species to colonize human remains. In these instances, recovered maggots may be analyzed for post-mortem interval (PMI) estimations, which may be used as evidence in courts of law. Current studies regarding S. bullata have revealed a maternal effect operating in these flies that prevents pupal diapause under certain environmental conditions, which is an important factor to be considered during forensic analyses.

== Taxonomy ==
Classification of the species has also proved difficult, as it has for much of the family Sarcophagidae. C.H. Curran, for instance, included Sarcophagidae in a larger family, Metopidae, that added some Muscidae and some Tachinidae. Most, however, consider S. bullata to be a member of the subfamily Sarcophaginae within Sarcophagidae. Within the genus Sarcophaga, the species is included by some in the subgenus Neobellieria.

== Morphology ==
=== Head ===
Sarcophaga bullata is approximately 8 to 17 millimeters in length. The head is colored ashen grey, and the arista (hair) of the antenna is plumose (feather-like) only at the base, unlike a Calliphorid fly, whose arista is plumose the entire length. The eyes of S. bullata are bright red in color, and are rather widely separated on the top of the head. On the genae, or cheeks, are long bristly hairs. Two orbital bristles are present on the females, while the orbital bristles are absent on the males.

=== Thorax ===
Present on the thorax are three contrasting black and grey longitudinal stripes; these stripes do not continue onto the abdomen. Sarcophaga have 4, rather than the normal 2 or 3, notopleural bristles, and 3 sternopleural bristles. A prominent row of black bristles (setae) can be found on each side of the thorax, just above the base of the hind leg and just under the base of the wing. These two sets of bristles are what differentiate Sarcophagidae from Muscidae. S. bullata lacks the postscutellum, the large swelling underneath the scutellum of the thorax, which distinguishes the flesh fly from Tachinid. S. bullata have black legs, translucent wings, and do not have a costal spine.

=== Abdomen ===
The abdomen is grey and slender, with a median black stripe. It is checkered with a shifting pattern and black reflecting spots. Sarcophaga most resemble the blow fly, but never have metallic colored abdomens. There are no bristles on the middle tibia of the fly, but the hind tibia has fringed or long hairs irregularly placed. The genitalia is located on the end of the abdomen and in the males is a bright red color. The genitalia is one of the main identification characteristics used to identify the different genera of Sarcophagidae.

== Development ==
The life cycle of Sarcophaga bullata is characterized by holometabolous development, though, like all known sarcophagids, the species is larviparous, meaning that the egg develops internally and females then give birth to first-instar larvae. This must be accounted for when using the species in forensic work to calculate a post-mortem interval.

=== Eggs ===
Though not much has been written specifically on the reproductive cycle of S. bullata, Sarcophagids are thought to be consistent within the family when it comes to life cycle. The eggs themselves are about 0.5 to 3.5 millimeters in length and 0.12 to 0.8 millimeters in width, though hatching occurs within the uterus just before the deposition of larvae.

=== Larva ===
Sarcophagidae larvae are white or pale yellow, cylindrical, and tapered anteriorly. All segments beyond the first have anterior and posterior bands of hairs. The mandibles are usually strong and curved, resembling a hook. Posterior spiracles are sunken in, which is a characteristic that can be used to distinguish between flesh fly and blow fly larvae. Larvae are most often found in decaying animal matter.

First instar:
First instar Sarcophagidae larvae are 0.5 to 5.0 millimeters long. The Sarcophaginae larvae, specifically, usually lack a labral sclerite, but in some cases it is present as a small, triangular plate located between the mandibles. The first segment is at times sclerotized on the dorsal surface, which can form a partial head capsule. The Sarcophaginae have a hypopharyngeal sclerite that is sometimes fused with the large tentoropharyngeal sclerite. They also lack an anterior spiracle, while the posterior spiracle usually consists of two lobes; rarely it may be bispinose.

Second instar:
Second instar larvae of the family Sarcophagidae are 4.0 to 10.0 millimeters long and closely resemble the third instar with the exception being that the posterior spiracle has only two openings.

Third instar:
Third instar larvae are 9.5 to 20 millimeters long. The mandibles are by now large and strongly curved. The dorsal cornu of the tentorpharyngeal sclerite appears incised due to a narrow apical window. The anterior spiracle is present with a short stalk that branches into several nodes, resembling a fan. The posterior spiracles now consist of three vertical slits within a sunken oval cavity. This cavity is surrounded by 8 to 12 tubercles, of which the dorsal ones are often sclerotized and have toothed processes, while the ventral tubercles are often covered in nipple-like projections. The anal opening is located in a fairly prominent posteroventral lobe that also has lateral tubercles.

== Distribution ==
Sarcophaga bullata do not have wide natural distribution, and can only be found in the Nearctic region, or the part of North America that is north of Mexico. It is most common in the eastern and southern United States, but can be found from the western coast of the United States to Canada. S. bullata are commonly found in rural and urban environments, and it is commonly found in houses and indoor dwellings, especially during the summer months. The flies prefer the warmer months, and are active from May to September, with the majority of the activity in August and September.

== Feeding habits ==
Adults of the family Sarcophagidae do not feed exclusively on carrion, despite the weighty implications of the name "flesh flies;" in fact, adult flies are frequently discovered feeding on sweet substances, such as sap and flower nectar. The flesh-eating character of the family refers primarily to sarcophagid maggots, which feed predominantly on carrion, exposed meat, and excrement. Sarcophaga bullata, in addition to all species of the family Sarcophagidae, may be considered "specialized flies," a term coined by Baker and Baker to describe flies that feed on carrion and dung. Specialized flies have been proven capable of detecting and selectively favoring plant nectars with high amino acid concentrations. Extensive research has suggested that S. bullata females in particular favor amino acid-containing nectars as opposed to strictly sugary nectars, perhaps to secure healthy levels of protein for successful reproduction.

Adult flesh flies are attracted to animal remains in both early and late decomposition stages, and have been known to fly through even the most extreme weather conditions to reach carrion. Though adult flies of the family Calliphoridae typically arrive on human remains before those of Sarcophagidae, sarcophagid adults are unhindered by nearly all climatic conditions and may reach the carrion first during particularly stormy weather. Rather than laying eggs, S. bullata females retain fertilized eggs internally until they develop into first-instar larvae, which are then deposited directly onto carrion. As sarcophagid larvae are larger than those of most other colonizing flies, they often present significant larval competition for other species. Though sarcophagid larvae have been attributed to causing myiasis, a condition in which maggots feed on the tissue of a living human or animal, they are most commonly discovered feeding on animal remains. In the southeastern United States, species of the genus Sarcophaga are the principal flies found during the warm summer months on bodies located indoors, as females frequently enter dwellings to deposit its larvae.

In terms of relevance to decomposing tissue analysis, forensic entomologists must disregard an egg development time period in post-mortem interval (PMI) calculations, as S. bullata and other sarcophagids deposit live larvae on carrion as opposed to eggs. For the same reason, fly egg masses discovered on human remains can be automatically ruled-out as belonging to sarcophagid flies.

== Social behavior ==
It is difficult to quantify the level and nature of "communication" that takes place among sarcophagid adults, though much is known about the role of pheromones in their reproductive physiologies. An experiment by Girard et al. in the 1970s demonstrated that S. bullata males release the sex pheromone hexanal, which was shown to attract over 65% of the females tested from over long distances. In studies regarding the social behavior of adult female sarcophagids larvipositing on animal remains, it has been suggested that adult females prefer to aggregate with other carrion flies and larviposit on carcasses that already have larvae present. A possible explanation for this selective preference is that an increased number of larvae results in a greater concentration of larval enzymatic secretions on the carrion, aiding in digestion. Sarcophagid larvae are also known to outcompete the larvae of other species and cause their extinction, and occasionally consume the smaller larvae present on animal remains.

== Natural predators ==
S. bullata has few, if any, specific natural predators due to their dispersal throughout the North American continent. Predators of S. bullata are carnivores, ranging from mammals and reptiles to carnivorous plants. However, a few primary predators are the Stagmomantis californica or the California Mantis, Catopsis berteroniana, Sceloporus undulatus or Eastern Fence Lizard, and the Perimyotis subflavus (Eastern Pipistrelle).

== Forensic related research ==
As members of Sarcophaga bullata are found from coast to coast in the United States and in parts of Canada, these flesh flies have been the focus of many forensically related studies. Most of these studies deal with the immature stages, as maggots are a helpful tool in the forensic world for determining post-mortem interval estimations. One such study concerning S. bullata determined that when evaluating a post-mortem interval, temperature plays a major role in maturation of the maggots and the decomposition of the surrounding tissue. This is an important consideration for forensic entomologists, as the ambient temperature at the crime scene before and during the colonization of human remains by arthropods must be accounted for to ensure that post-mortem interval estimations are accurate.

Another important consideration with the grey flesh flies concerns maggot mass temperature. "Maggot mass" refers to a large group of maggots clustered together at a particular location on a carcass. Reporting an accurate temperature is critical to properly calculating accumulated degree hours in the estimation of a post-mortem interval. Accumulated degree hours and similar measures are determined to attempt to trace back the "age" of the maggots and determine the time of exposure of decaying tissue. Some scientists claim that maggot mass temperature is generally significantly above ambient air temperature. Others maintain that while maggot mass temperature may be elevated in a laboratory setting, in the field the maggots self-regulate their temperature by moving in and out of the feeding mass. Obviously, more research is needed to determine the general effects of maggot mass temperature.

Other work has been reported concerning tanning in S. bullata with the age pigment lipofuscin. Lipofuscin accumulation in larvae is a linear function of time. Some of the pigment is disposed of at the pupal stage and then linear accumulation resumes in adults. Many projects have focused on an assay of this pigment as it could hold a rather accurate technique for aging S. bullata and other forensically important insects.

=== Temperature data ===
To estimate insect age, forensic entomologists must determine the amount of time a particular insect spends in each stage of development and apply this information to temperature data at a crime scene to determine a post-mortem interval estimation. Timing of various insect stages is determined in a laboratory at standardized temperatures so that ranges may be applied to the different temperature conditions encountered in the field. Post-mortem intervals are estimated by determining the accumulated degree days (ADD) or accumulated degree hours (ADH) acquired by each insect stage on the remains; this information is then used to calculate the overall degree days or degree hours accumulated during the insect's entire life cycle and association with the carcass, representing the minimal amount of time the body has been available for colonization by insects. This estimation does not claim to represent an accurate time of death, but rather a minimal time of colonization. This is an important distinction that must be considered with the use of forensic evidence in courts of law.

Accumulated degree days can be determined by subtracting the minimum threshold from the average ambient temperature over a 24-hour period and multiplying the difference by the corresponding number of days. Accumulated degree hours, which are equally useful, are similarly determined by subtracting the minimum threshold from the ambient temperature over a 1-hour period and multiplying the difference by the corresponding number of hours. The term "minimum threshold" refers to the lowest temperature at which an insect species will develop; any temperatures below this threshold will result in delayed development and probable death of the insect in question.

Similar calculations may be carried out to determine "accumulated degree minutes," "accumulated degree seconds," etc., though ADD and ADH are typically used in forensic analyses.

For S. bullata, the following temperature data has been determined in a laboratory setting. These calculations correspond to a standardized temperature of 27 °C.

Stage	Time Spent in Stage (27 °C)
Egg	---
1st Instar Larvae	26 hrs
2nd Instar Larvae	18 hrs
3rd Instar Larvae	54 hrs
Prepupae	112 hrs
Pupae	12 days
Total	17 days

== Other research ==
Another study was conducted concerning an effect by the mothers of the flesh fly population. There is a maternal effect that operates in S. bullata that can prevent pupal diapause when reared under short day conditions. It was determined that certain environmental stressors or chemical treatments on the mother, such as extreme temperature shocks, food deprivation and reducing maternal size, were ineffective in altering the diapause-suppressant. However, there were several chemical agents that proved effective. Gamma-aminobutyric acid, octopamine and pilocarpine all countered the maternal affect and permitted the expression of diapause in the flesh fly progeny. The ability to express diapause is an important consideration for forensic entomologists as diapause allows the pupae to become metabolically "dormant" until environmental conditions improve; this would significantly affect pupal time estimations and subsequent post-mortem interval estimations.

== See also ==
- List of parasites (human)
