= Jitender P. Dubey =

Parasitologist and Microbiologist

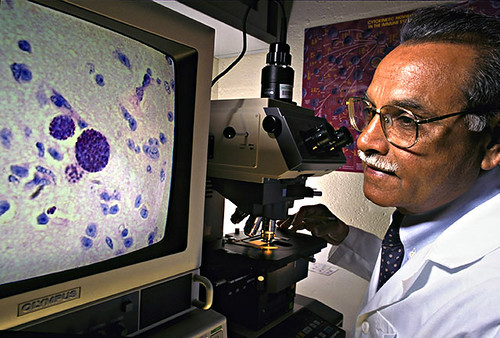
- Born: July 15, 1938 (age 88); India
- Education: University of Sheffield
- Occupations: Parasitologist and Microbiologist
- Employer: United States Department of Agriculture - Agricultural Research Service
- Known for: Control and diagnosis of Toxoplasma gondii and naming Neospora caninum & Sarcocystis neurona

Jitender P. Dubey (born July 15, 1938) is a veterinary parasitologist and microbiologist who pioneered the control and diagnosis of Toxoplasma gondii (T. gondii), Neospora caninum, and Sarcocystis neurona. Dubey discovered the life cycle of Toxoplasma gondii, and discovered and named both Neospora caninum and Sarcocystis neurona.

== Early life ==
Dubey was born in India and received his veterinary degree in 1960, and Master in Veterinary Parasitology in 1963. In 1966, Dubey received his Ph.D. in medical microbiology from the University of Sheffield, England. From 1968 to 1973, he completed post doctoral training with Dr. J.K. Frenkel at the Department of Pathology and Oncology, University of Kansas Medical Center, in Kansas City. Dubey has lived in Greenbelt, Maryland since 1982.

== Career ==
Jitender Dubey has spent over 30 years working for the United States Federal Government. Prior to joining the U.S. Department of Agriculture in 1982, he was a professor at The Ohio State University in the Pathobiology Department from 1973 to 1978 and Montana State University's Department of Veterinary science from 1978 to 1982. During his career at the USDA Agricultural Research Service Animal Parasitic Diseases Research Unit, his work has involved the identification of lifecycle and ecology of parasites, parasitic disease, and how they infect their hosts.

Dubey is most associated with the discovery of how the parasite Toxoplasma gondii is transmitted to humans and animals through cat feces and consumption of undercooked, infected meat. He discovered that Toxoplasma gondii can be carried by cats and they can release the parasite's eggs (oocysts) through their feces and causes birth defects and vision loss in humans and miscarriage in livestock. His discovery lead to labels on cat litter, and informed prenatal advice against pregnant women handling cat litter because of the effects on unborn children if an egg is ingested. He named the parasites Sarcocystic neruona which causes fatal neurological diseases in horses and Neospora caninum which causes cattle miscarriages and crippling disease in companion animals.

== Awards and memberships ==
Jitender Dubey was chosen as the first recipient of the Distinguished Veterinary Parasitologist Award by the American Association of Veterinary Parasitologists in 1985. He received a WAAVP Pfizer Award for outstanding contributions to research in veterinary parasitology in 1995 and the Eminent Parasitologists Award from the American Society of Parasitologists in 2005. In 2010, Dubey was inducted into the Agricultural Research Service Science Hall of Fame for his discovery that Toxoplasma gondii can be carried by cats. Dubey was the first recipient of the William C. Campbell One-Health Award from the American Association of Veterinary Parasitologists in 2018. In 2021 Dubey was named a finalist for a Samuel J. Heyman Service to America Medal.

=== Memberships ===
- Member of the National Academy of Sciences since 2010.
