= Heather Simpson (academic) =

New Zealand professor of animal physiology

- Other name: Heather Vivian Simpson

Academic background
- Education: Massey University
- Thesis: Water and electrolyte transfers in ruminants (1969)
- Doctoral advisor: Donald Alexander Titchen, Maurice Lancaster, Cam Reid

Heather Vivian Simpson is a New Zealand animal physiologist, and is professor emerita at Massey University, specialising in the biology of gastrointestinal parasites of sheep.

== Academic career ==
Simpson earned a Bachelor of Science with Honours at the University of Queensland in Australia. Simpson then joined Massey University in New Zealand as a part-time demonstrator, while also completing her PhD. Her dissertation was titled Water and electrolyte transfers in ruminants, and was finished in 1969, and supervised by Donald Titchen, Maurice Lancaster and Campbell Reid. Simpson joined the faculty at Massey in 1976, initially part-time as she was raising two children. She was appointed senior lecturer by 1994, and associate professor in 2000, rising to full professor, as Professor of Animal Physiology, in 2007.

During her time at Massey, Simpson taught nearly every veterinary student to graduate in New Zealand, and was patron of the Veterinary Students Association. She published more than 60 papers and supervised 21 postgraduate students. Simpson's research focused on agriculturally important gastrointestinal parasites of sheep, such as Teladorsagia spp. and Haemonchus contortus, which she found interesting because of "the relationship between two organisms and the struggle between them".

When Simpson retired in 2015, she was the longest-serving academic at Massey, having at that point spent fifty years at the university, forty-five of them on staff. The previous longest-serving academic was Sylvia Rumball. Simpson retained an honorary position at AgResearch, and continued to supervise her remaining doctoral students after her retirement.

== Personal life ==
Simpson is married to Dr Bruce Simpson. Her hobbies include growing orchids, and collecting shells and stamps.

== Selected works ==
- Gajenathiran Sinnathamby; Henderson, Gemma; Saleh Umair; Peter Janssen; Ross Bland; Simpson, Heather Vivian (2018). "The bacterial community associated with the sheep gastrointestinal nematode parasite Haemonchus contortus". PLOS One. 13 (2) e0192164. doi:10.1371/journal.pone.0192164. PMC 5805237. PMID 29420571. Wikidata Q50114550.
- Simpson, Heather Vivian; S M C Przemeck; I Scott; D G Thomas; R S Green; G W Reynolds (2009). "Pathophysiology in Teladorsagia (Ostertagia) circumcincta-infected sheep selected for high fleece weight". Veterinary Parasitology. 163 (1–2): 73–80. doi:10.1016/j.vetpar.2009.03.049. PMID 19398276. Wikidata Q39278539.
- A Luque; L R Walker; J C Pedley; K C Pedley; K Hillrichs; Simpson, Heather Vivian; D C Simcock (2009). "Teladorsagia circumcincta: survival of adults in vitro is enhanced by the presence of a mammalian cell line". Experimental Parasitology. 124 (2): 247–251. doi:10.1016/j.exppara.2009.10.002. PMID 19852958. Wikidata Q39784100.
- Simpson, Heather Vivian; Saleh Umair; V C Hoang; Savoian, Matthew (2016). "Histochemical study of the effects on abomasal mucins of Haemonchus contortus or Teladorsagia circumcincta infection in lambs". Veterinary Parasitology. 226: 210–221. doi:10.1016/j.vetpar.2016.06.026. PMID 27387375. Wikidata Q40622366.
- Saleh Umair; L W McMurtry; J S Knight; Simpson, Heather Vivian (2016). "Use of fluorescent lectin binding to distinguish eggs of gastrointestinal nematode parasites of sheep". Veterinary Parasitology. 217: 76–80. doi:10.1016/j.vetpar.2015.12.029. PMID 26827865. Wikidata Q40811577.
