= Anthrax mite =

Sarcoptes anthracis

Scientific classification
- Kingdom: Animalia
- Phylum: Arthropoda
- Subphylum: Chelicerata
- Class: Arachnida
- Order: Sarcoptiformes
- Family: Sarcoptidae
- Genus: Sarcoptes
- Species: S. anthracis

Binomial name
- Sarcoptes anthracis Iwanowski, 1901

Species of mite

The Anthrax mite (Sarcoptes anthracis) is a pathogenic mite and an intermediate host of anthrax.

== Morphology ==
Sarcoptes anthracis mites have a circular body that is convex on the dorsal side and flat on the ventral side, with four pairs of legs. The first two pairs end in suckers, while the last two pairs have long bristles. Adult females measure approximately 300–500 μm in length, and their surface is covered with scales and fine striations.

== Life cycle ==
The life cycle of the mite consists of several stages:

- Egg: Large and ellipsoid, measuring around 230 μm in length.
- Larva: Six-legged, hatching from the egg and cutting through the skin to dig new burrows.
- Nymph: Molts from the larva to become a first- or second-stage nymph.
- Adult: Round, sac-like, and eyeless.

The complete life cycle takes about 2–3 weeks. Adult female mites lay 2–3 eggs per day within the skin’s outermost layer, the stratum corneum. The burrows they create appear as tiny, raised, serpentine lines, which can be grayish or skin-colored, and may exceed a centimeter in length.

== Parasite and anthrax vector ==
The parasitic mite Sarcoptes anthracis was first classified by Dmitri Ivanovsky in 1901, after initial cases of infection were observed in Asian Tufted Deer. These mites burrow into the skin of their host, causing sarcoptic mange, predominantly affecting even-toed ungulates. Pregnant female mites tunnel into the host’s stratum corneum and deposit eggs. The young mites, after hatching, move across the skin and molt into the nymphal stage, where they may harbor the bacterial pathogen Bacillus anthracis in their digestive system. As vectors, the mites can transmit anthrax, leading to fatal infections in hosts whose immune systems are weakened by the mange.

The high host specificity of the mites limits their impact to primarily even-toed ungulates. The last reported focus of infection occurred in the late 1950s among semi-domesticated reindeer.
