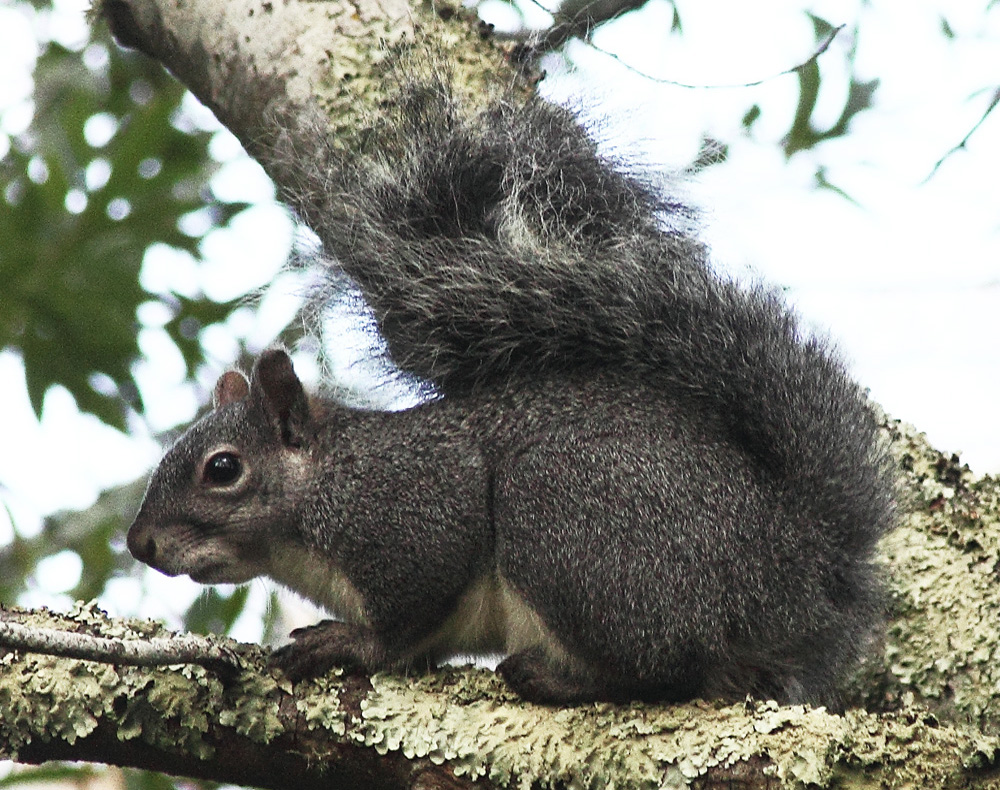

Conservation status
- Least Concern (IUCN 3.1)

- Secure (NatureServe)

Scientific classification
- Kingdom: Animalia
- Phylum: Chordata
- Class: Mammalia
- Order: Rodentia
- Family: Sciuridae
- Genus: Sciurus
- Species: S. griseus

Binomial name
- Sciurus griseus Ord, 1818

Subspecies
- S. g. griseus; S. g. anthonyi; S. g. nigripes
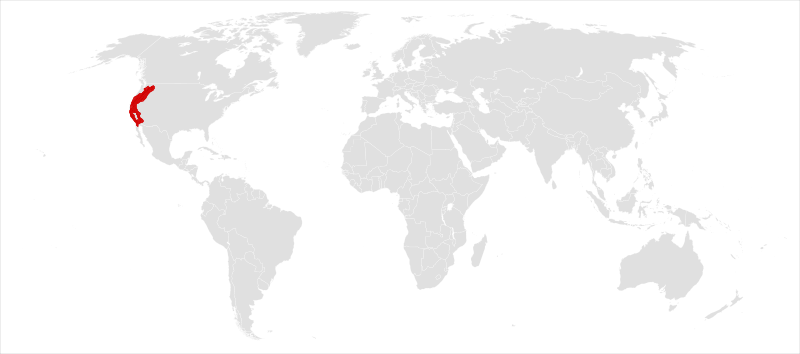
- Western gray squirrel's range

= Western gray squirrel =

Species of rodent

The western gray squirrel (Sciurus griseus) is a tree squirrel found along the western coast of the United States and Mexico. In some places, this species has also been known as the silver-gray squirrel, the California gray squirrel, the Oregon gray squirrel, the Columbian gray squirrel and the banner-tail. There are three geographical subspecies: S. g. griseus (central Washington to the western Sierra Nevada in central California); S. g. nigripes (from south of San Francisco Bay to San Luis Obispo County, California); and S. g. anthonyi (which ranges from San Luis Obispo to northern Baja California).

In some landscapes, the western gray squirrel has lost habitat or experienced local extinction due to competition with other squirrel species and other pressures on their population.

== Description ==
The western gray squirrel was first described by George Ord in 1818 based on notes taken by Lewis and Clark at The Dalles in Wasco County, Oregon.

Sciurus griseus is the largest tree squirrel in the Sierra Nevada and Central California range. It has plantigrade, pentadactyl feet with two phalanges. Compared with the eastern gray squirrel S. carolinensis or the fox squirrel S. niger (which have been introduced into its native range), these squirrels are shy, and will generally run up a tree and give a hoarse chirping call when disturbed. Weights vary from about .35 to 1 kilogram (0.77 to 2.20 lb), and length (including tail) from 43 to 61 centimetres (17 to 24 in).

Western gray squirrels exhibit a unique form of coloring around their bodies. They have solid gray fur on most of their body, which is most prevalent on their backs and sides. They have four toes on their two front feet and five toes on their two back feet.

Tree squirrels undergo a complete head-to-tail molt in the spring and a rump-to-head molt in the fall. Tail hair is replaced only in the spring. Nesting mothers will use their tail hair to line birthing nests. Western gray squirrels eat berries, nuts, a variety of seeds, and the eggs of small birds. The dental formula for S. griseus is 1.0.2.31.0.1.3 × 2 = 22.

== Ecology and behavior ==
Western gray squirrels forage mainly on the ground, but rarely move far from trees and tend to avoid open spaces. They use tree cover for access to escape routes, and can move rapidly through close canopy cover. However, they are less agile in trees than other tree squirrel species, and rarely make large leaps between tree branches. They are primarily diurnal and alternate between periods of activity and rest, growing less active in the later day. During windy or stormy conditions they typically remain close to their nests.

When alarmed, western gray squirrels rapidly climb a tree and face their perceived threat while flagging their tails and making repeated "chuck" noises, typically rising in pitch as the alarm call is sustained.

Western gray squirrels play an important ecological role in maintaining and rejuvenating oak woodlands. They are important dispersers of fungi, particularly hypogeous fungi with subterranean fruiting bodies. The squirrels eat large quantities of truffles and truffle-like fungi, and disperse their spores through their droppings. Many of these fungi are ectomycorrhizal symbiotes of trees, especially oaks, which they provide with nitrogen through symbiotic nitrogen-fixing bacteria. The squirrels also play a role in dispersing oaks, particularly Oregon white oak and red oaks (subgenus Erythrobalanus) by gathering and burying acorns outside of their parent tree's dispersal range; while these are stored for food, many are not recovered and thus germinate instead.

Competition with other native species is reduced chiefly through habitat preferences. Douglas squirrels and American red squirrels chiefly inhabit coniferous forests, although competition may occur at areas of habitat overlap. Northern flying squirrels inhabit the same habitat range as western gray squirrels and consume similar foods, but the two species may avoid direct competition by foraging at different times, as flying squirrels are nocturnal.

=== Nesting ===
There are two stick nest types made by western gray squirrels. The first is a large, round, covered shelter nest for winter use and rearing young. The second is a broad platform for seasonal or temporary use. Both types are built with sticks, twigs, leaves, and moss, and are lined with leaves, moss, lichens, and shredded bark. The nest may measure 43 to 91 cm (17 to 36 in) by up to 46 cm (18 in) and is usually found in the top third of the tree. Individuals move between nests frequently, often using multiple over the course of a day, and a single nest may be occupied by several distinct squirrels in succession, although it's rare for more than one squirrel to use the same nest at the same time.

In addition to stick nests, females also use tree cavities for rearing young. These are often created by enlarging an existing woodpecker hole or a cavity created by decay or the loss of a tree limb. Females my move their young between different nest during the rearing period.

Young or traveling squirrels will also "sleep rough" when weather permits, balanced spread-eagled on a tree limb high above the forest floor. This attitude is also adopted for cooling in hot weather, a behavior also observed in raccoons.

=== Reproduction ===
They mate over a period ranging from December through June. Females undergo estrous for a single day at a time, with a primary shared estrous period in January-December and a secondary one in June. Males remain sexually receptive from December until June-July. Males chase receptive females both on the ground and in trees, and become highly aggressive towards one another. Young are born within leaf nests or tree cavities in litters of one to six, after an approximate 44-to-45-day gestation period. Most offspring leave the nest between March and August, and afterwards disperse from their birth area. Only 15-25% of individuals reach their second year of life.

Western gray squirrels reach sexual maturity at 10 to 11 months, and at approximately one year of age, will begin breeding. Older females are likelier to successfully raise offspring than younger ones.

=== Diet ===
Western gray squirrels feed on oak and conifer seeds. Fungi, including both epigeous (aboveground) and hypogeous (subterranean) species, are also an important element of their diets. Hypogeous fungi such as truffles and false truffles are an important food item, forming over half of the diet of Californian populations; years of high fungal fruiting may consequently serve as a "buffer" for poor tree mast years. Additional food sources include flowers, fruits, forbs, sap, and cambium. Green vegetation is eaten mainly in late spring and early summer when other food sources are seasonally scarce, but is also consumed heavily during bad mast years or following fires.

=== Predators ===
The western gray squirrel has many predators. Known predators include red-tailed hawks (Buteo jamaicensis), great horned owls (Bubo virginianus), eagles (Accipitridae), bobcats (Lynx rufus), coyotes (Canis latrans), cougars (Puma concolor), domestic cats (Felis catus) and domestic dogs (Canis familiaris). Potential predators include red foxes (Vulpes vulpes), gray foxes, (Urocyon cinereoargenteus), American martens (Martes americana), fishers (Pekania pennanti), and weasels (Mustela spp.).

However, the predation does not control the squirrel's population density.

=== Diseases ===
Western gray squirrels are highly susceptible to notoedric mange, which can cause noticeable population collapses. Squirrels affected by mange lose coordination, become emaciated, and develop scabs around their eyes. Severe cases have been recorded to cause direct mortality; additionally, the weakened state of affected squirrels causes them difficulty in foraging and makes them vulnerable to predation. Mange also causes abandonment of offspring. An outbreak of notoedric mange in 1926 nearly eradicated the population in Yosemite Valley, prompting the closing of the squirrel hunting season in California until the population had recovered in 1946. A mange outbreak decimated the population in Yakima County, Washington in 1950, dropping it to levels that it has not since recovered from. Another outbreak in Klickitat County affected 59% of recovered squirrels, with corresponding mortality.

Other diseases and parasites affecting western gray squirrels include coccidiosis, western viral equine encephalitis, fleas, ticks and mites, lice, coccidia, intestinal roundworms, ringworm, papilloma, and botflies. Like mange, coccidiosis has been linked to mass deaths of squirrels, particularly in the Los Angeles and Santa Barbara counties in the 1930s. Most of these afflictions are linked to or caused by the presence of external parasites, and squirrels are believed to construct and move between multiple nests in part to reduce their exposure to these.

== Distribution and habitat ==
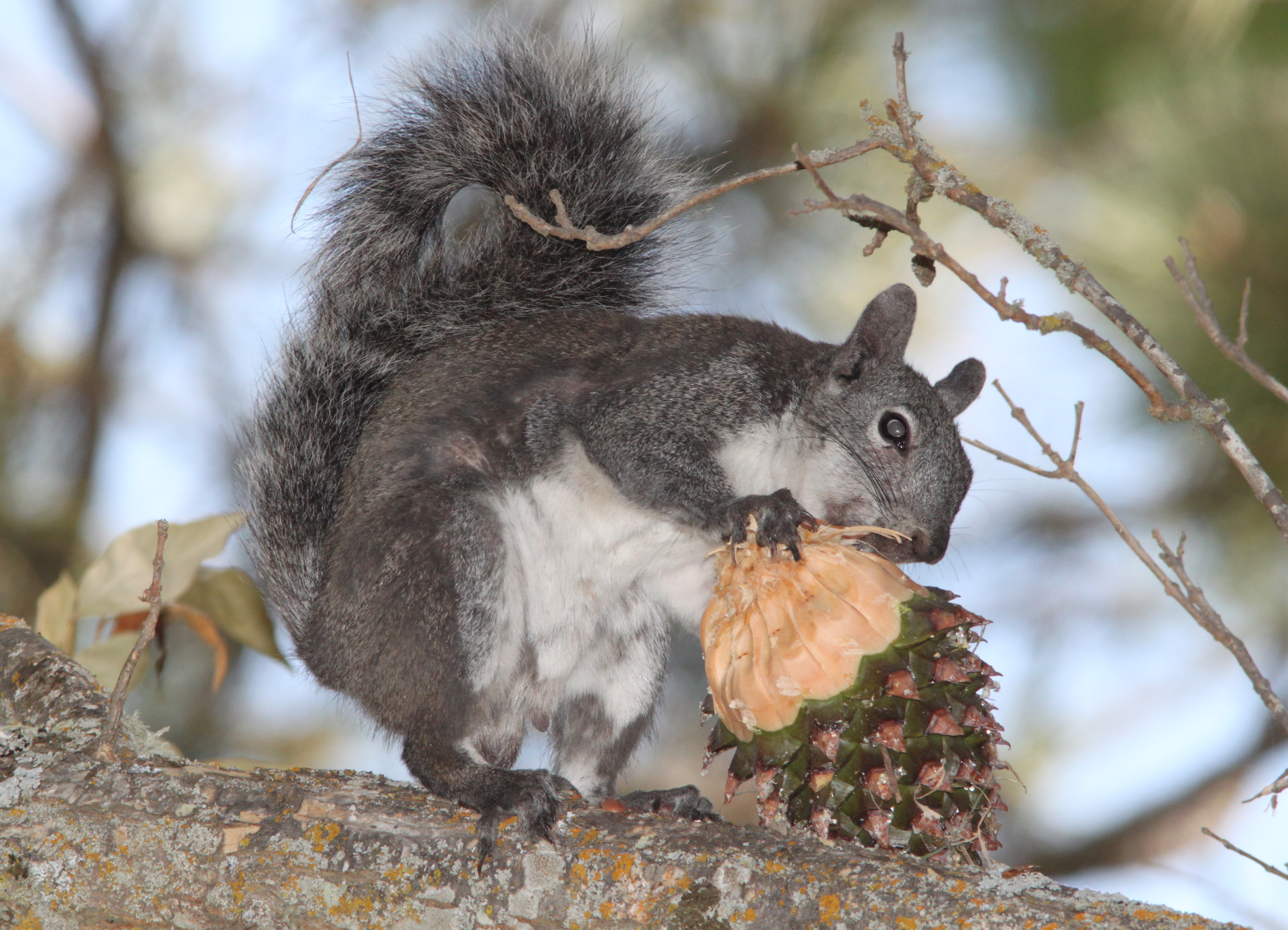
A western gray squirrel eating pine seeds from a pine cone

The Pacific Northwest is home to the western gray squirrel. They are the largest tree squirrel native to this region. They have been spotted at several human made locations in California, such as Bidwell Park or the campus to CSU Chico.

Eastern gray squirrels occur along the Pacific coast from northern Washington state to the southern border of California, extending inland until the California-Nevada border at Truckee. Populations are known to exist in Mexico, including at the Laguna Hanson lake in the central Sierra de Juarez in Baja California, but the Mexican distribution of the species is poorly studied.

In Washington, the species historically occurred in the Columbia River Gorge and both sides of the Cascade Mountains. In the present, eastern gray squirrels occur only in three disjunct populations; the first is located in Pierce County in the southern part of the Puget Trough; the second is in Klickitat County and eastern Skamania County in the Columbia River basin; and the third is in Chelan County and Okanogan County in the north-central portion of the state. The Pierce County population is concentrated in the Fort Lewis Military Reserve, which contains the largest remaining area of ponderosa pine forest in the Puget Through. In the Klickitat region, gray squirrels occur unevenly in several sub-populations scattered among oak-conifer forests along the Columbia River's tributary streams, including Klickitat River, the White Salmon River, and Rock Creek. In the Okanogan region, gray squirrels occur mainly where ponderosa forests meet conifer-hardwood woodlands along riparian areas, including at the northern tip of Lake Chelan. These populations are reproductively isolated from one another and from the Californian populations further south.

Western gray squirrels inhabit mixed conifer-hardwood forests, typically preferring conifer-dominated forests containing oaks and consisting of large, mast-producing trees. A mixture of tree species, abundant seeds and fungi, and closely interconnected canopies that provide escape routes are all important habitat requirements. In the Puget Trough, they are mostly found in oak-pine ecotones between Douglas fir forests and prairies. These ecotones mainly consist of Douglas fir and Oregon white oak alongside secondary tree species such as Oregon ash, bitter cherry, cascara, and bigleaf maple. In the Klickitat region, they occur mostly at the convergence of oak and pine forests, and occur mostly in association with stands of white oak, Douglas fir, and ponderosa pine, alongside riparian areas forested by bigleaf maple, Oregon ash, black cottonwood, quaking aspen, and introduced nut trees. Squirrels in the Okanogan population mostly live in stands of Douglas fir, ponderosa, and cottonwood.

== Conservation and threats ==
The primary ecological threats to western gray squirrels are habitat loss and fragmentation, roadkill mortality, and disease. Competition from introduced eastern gray squirrels and fox squirrels is a potential source of future risk. Road mortality affects western gray squirrel mortality at several times the rate of predation.

In Washington State, the western gray squirrel was listed as a threatened species in 1993, and was reclassified as endangered in November 2023. Populations of the western gray squirrel have not recovered from past reductions. They are threatened with habitat loss, road-kill mortality and disease. Habitat has been lost due to urbanization, wild fires in the Okanogan area, and areas of forest degraded by fire suppression and overgrazing, allowing the invasion of scotch broom in the southern Puget Sound area. Notoedric mange, a disease caused by mites, becomes epidemic in western gray squirrel populations and is a major source of mortality. Other species, such as eastern gray squirrels, fox squirrels, California ground squirrels and wild turkeys are expanding and competing with the western gray squirrel.

=== Competition ===
Western gray squirrels compete with a number of introduced rodent species. Populations of introduced eastern gray squirrels and fox squirrels have become established in California, Oregon, and Washington. The direct impact of introduced squirrel species on western gray squirrels has received limited study, although it has been reported that in California eastern squirrels have formed large populations in riparian, moist woodland, and suburban habitats but have not penetrated significantly into drier upland woodlands where western squirrels remain predominant. In Oregon, eastern squirrels are also mainly reported in urban areas, where western squirrels tend to be absent.

California ground squirrels first appeared in Washington state in 1913 through unclear means, although their expansion appears linked to the construction of dams and bridges along the Columbia River, and expanded rapidly along the Cascade Range. They are known to be more aggressive than western gray squirrels and to consume many of the same foods. Competition with co-native species is a secondary factor in western gray squirrel distribution. Douglas squirrels (Tamiasciurus douglasii) mainly inhabit coniferous forests, reducing direct competition with gray squirrels, but the encroachment of Douglas fir into oak-dominated woodlands as a result of fire suppression can lead to overlap and competition for resources between the species.

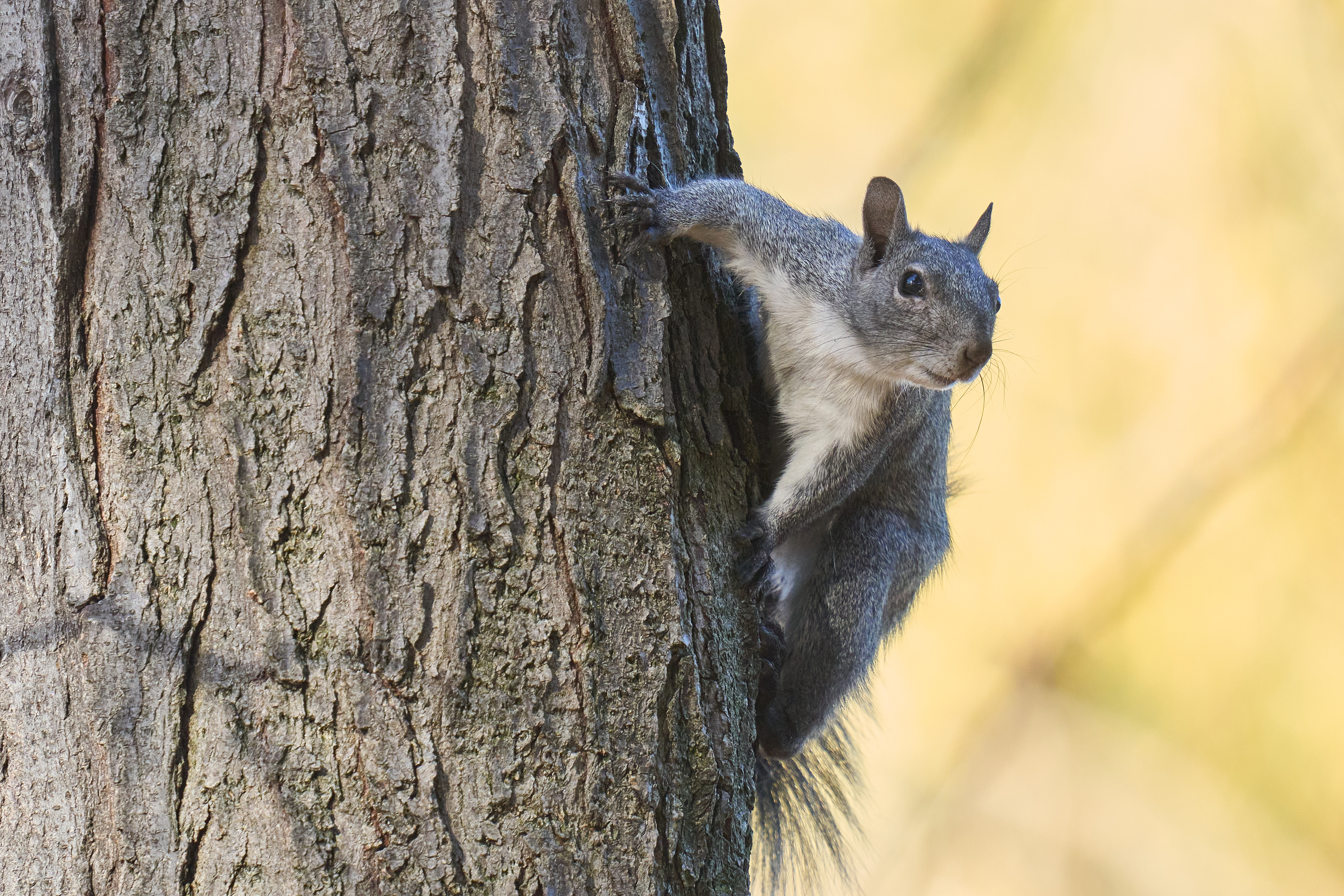
In the San Jose Hills near San Dimas

Listed as extirpated in some California areas, the western gray squirrel in southern California is generally found only in the mountains and surrounding foothill communities. Local rehabilitation experts recount that fox squirrels were released in urban regions of Los Angeles throughout the 20th century. Fox squirrels were introduced to the Los Angeles area in about 1904. Civil War and Spanish–American War veterans residing at the Sawtelle Veterans Home on Sepulveda and Wilshire Boulevards brought fox squirrels as pets to this site from their homes in the areas surrounding the Mississippi Valley (possibly Tennessee). Other introductions of fox squirrels to the Los Angeles area may have taken place during more recent times, but detailed records are not available. These aggressive cousins drove the more reclusive western gray squirrels back into the mountains, where competition was not so strong. This non-native species introduction appears to be the largest threat in the southern California area.

== See also ==
- Fox squirrel
- Eastern gray squirrel
- California ground squirrel
