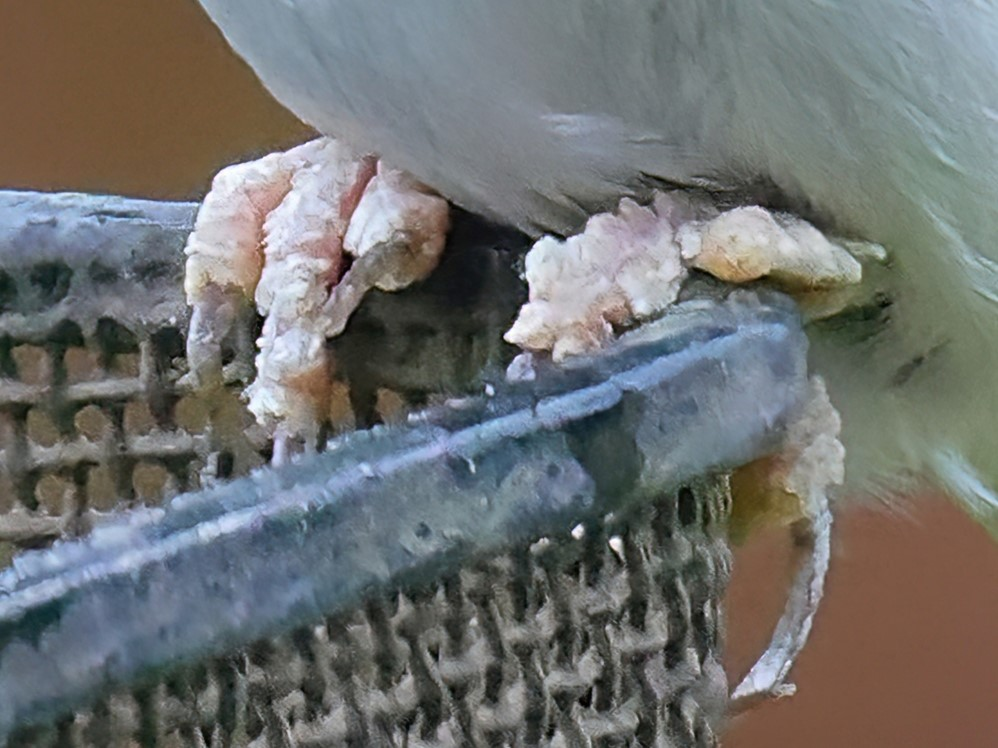

Scientific classification
- Domain: Eukaryota
- Kingdom: Animalia
- Phylum: Arthropoda
- Subphylum: Chelicerata
- Class: Arachnida
- Order: Sarcoptiformes
- Family: Epidermoptidae
- Genus: Knemidokoptes
- Species: K. mutans

Binomial name
- Knemidokoptes mutans Robin & Lanquentin, 1859

= Knemidokoptes mutans =

Species of mite

Knemidokoptes mutans, also known as the scaly leg mite, is a species of mite in the family Epidermoptidae. It is the cause of the bird ailment scaly foot.
