= Punjab Veterinary Sciences University =

GADVASU) was established with the objective of promoting livestock production, health and prevention of diseases through integrated teaching and extension programs in related fields. It is located at Ludhiana, in Punjab and aims to serve the rural people of Punjab by improving their quality of life and producing specialists within them.

== Educational streams ==
GADVASU has established several institutions for the purpose of educating students in the related fields of veterinary sciences. The College of Fisheries under it is the only college in the states of Punjab, Haryana, Himachal Pradesh and Jammu & Kashmir for producing professionally and technically qualified manpower to cater to the needs of a fast developing fisheries sector.

The University offers five year and four year integrated programs in veterinary and animal sciences, and dairy technology. Master's degrees are offered in veterinary sciences, dairy sciences and fishery sciences.

College of Dairy Science and Technology under this university deals with the problems associated with the processing of milk and new product development. This institute deals with safety and quality of milk in the region. There is an experimental dairy plant situated with in this college.

A veterinary hospital, located within the hospital premises, provides clinical training to the students. Applicants are required to pass 10+2 or equivalent examination with physics, chemistry, biology/maths and English from a recognized board or university with a minimum of 50% marks in aggregate to secure admission in these undergraduate degree courses.

== Facilities ==
The veterinary hospital as well as the dairy and poultry farms help students in training and research. The experimental dairy plant helps student to learn the fundamentals and technologies used in dairy processing. A book bank located in the complex provides students with textbooks. Books and journals in various fields of veterinary science and animal husbandry are available. The university provides hostel facilities to the out-station students. Students can also access the Internet at the Computer centre.

== Departments ==
- Veterinary Biochemistry
- Veterinary Clinical Services
- Veterinary Physiology
- Veterinary Microbiology
- Veterinary Epidemiology and Preventive Medicine
- Veterinary Pharmacology and Toxicology
- Veterinary Parasitology
- Veterinary Medicine, Jurisprudence and Ethics
- Veterinary Public Health
- Livestock Products Technology
- Veterinary Surgery and Radiology
- Veterinary Pathology
- Dairy Engineering
- Dairy Microbiology
- Dairy Chemistry
- Dairy Technology
- Dairy Economics
