= American Association of Veterinary Parasitologists =

- Abbreviation: AAVP
- Formation: 1956; 70 years ago
- Headquarters: Schaumburg, Illinois
- Location: Baton Rouge, Louisiana, United States
- President: Martin Nielsen
- President-Elect & 2022 Program Chair: Antoinette Marsh
- Vice-President: Jennifer Ketzis
- Secretary/Treasurer: Adriano Vatta
- Website: www.aavp.org

The American Association of Veterinary Parasitologists is a professional association for veterinary parasitology. Despite the name it primarily serves both the United States and Canada and to a lesser degree the entire world. The AAVP connects veterinary parasitologists to each other and provides recommendations as to research and practice methods.

== Journals ==
As part of its professional development and education mission the AAVP publishes:

- Veterinary Parasitology — along with Elsevier
