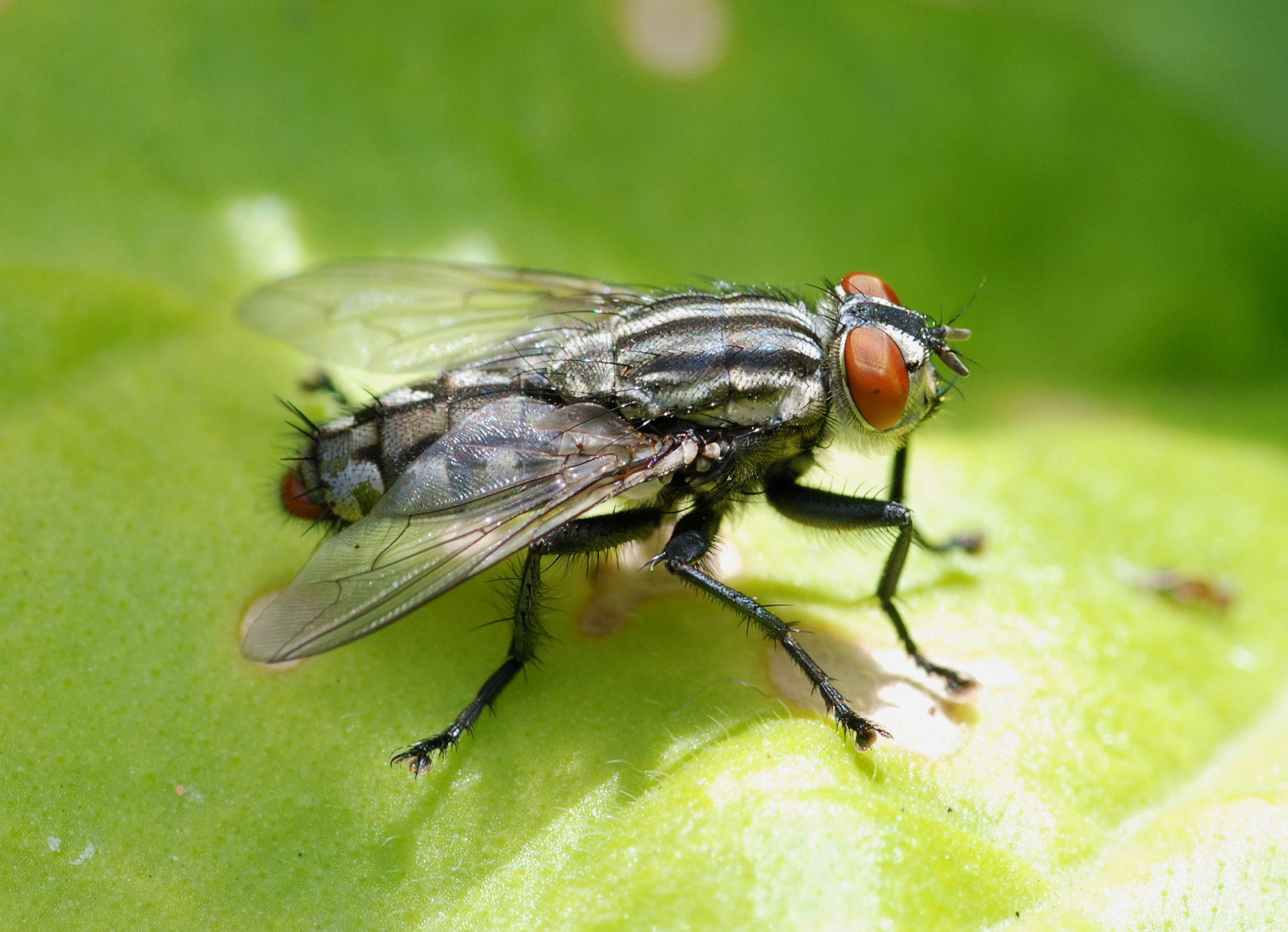
- Sarcophaga africa

Scientific classification
- Kingdom: Animalia
- Phylum: Arthropoda
- Clade: Pancrustacea
- Class: Insecta
- Order: Diptera
- Family: Sarcophagidae
- Subfamily: Sarcophaginae
- Genus: Sarcophaga; Meigen, 1826

Type species
- Sarcophaga carnaria (Linnaeus, 1758)

= Sarcophaga =

Genus of insects (true flies)

Sarcophaga is a genus of true flies and the type genus of the flesh-fly family (Sarcophagidae). The members of this cosmopolitan genus are frequently known as common flesh flies. There are more than 1000 species in Sarcophaga.

This genus occurs essentially worldwide. These flies are generally well-sized and of a greyish color; like many of their relatives, the typical patterns are lengthwise darker stripes on the thorax and dark and light square dots on the abdomen. Many have conspicuous red compound eyes. These are set further apart in females than in males; the females are also larger on average. As typical for this family, it is almost impossible to tell the species apart from their outward appearance, and many can only be reliably identified by microscopic examination of the males' genitalia.

As the common name implies, their larvae typically feed on decaying meat. Some, however, instead eat the bacteria and other small organisms living on carrion. Many species have adapted to humans, and while they are usually nuisance pests, some are medically significant vectors of pathogens and bacteria. Sometimes, the larvae cause myiasis. Others are parasitoids of pest caterpillars and beneficial in forestry and orchards.

Well-known species are Sarcophaga africa, Sarcophaga bercaea, the grey flesh-fly Sarcophaga bullata, Sarcophaga carnaria, Sarcophaga crassipalpis, the friendly fly Sarcophaga aldrichi and the red-tailed flesh-fly Sarcophaga haemorrhoidalis.

== Subgenera ==
The immense number of Sarcophaga species is divided among the following subgenera, some of which are occasionally considered (and may well be) distinct genera:

- Aethianella Zumpt, 1972
- Aethiopisca Rohdendorf, 1963
- Afrohelicobia Zumpt, 1972
- Afrothyrsocnema Rohdendorf, 1963
- Alisarcophagaa Fan & Chen, 1981
- Amharomyia Verves, 1984
- Anthostilophalla Lehrer, 1993
- Asceloctella Enderlein, 1928
- Asiopierretia Rohdendorf, 1965
- Australopierretia Verves, 1987
- Baliisca Verves, 1980
- Baranovisca Lopes, 1985
- Batissophalla Rohdendorf, 1963
- Bellieriomima Rohdendorf, 1937
- Bercaea (Robineau-Desvoidy, 1863)
- Bercaeopsis Townsend, 1917
- Beziella Enderlein, 1937
- Bilenemyia Verves, 1989
- Boettcheria Rohdendorf, 1937
- Brasia Strand, 1932
- Caledonia Curran, 1929
- Callostuckenbergia Lehrer & Lehrer, 1992
- Camerounisca Verves, 1989
- Cercosarcophaga Zumpt, 1972
- Chaetophalla Rohdendorf, 1963
- Chrysosarcophaga Townsend, 1933
- Curranisca Rohdendorf, 1963
- Curtophalla Lehrer, 1994
- Cyclophalla Rohdendorf, 1963
- Danbeckia Lehrer, 1994
- Dinemomyia Chen, 1975
- Diplonophalla Lehrer, 1994
- Discachaeta Enderlein, 1928
- Drakensbergiana Lehrer, 1992
- Durbanella Lehrer, 1994
- Dysparaphalla Rohdendorf, 1965
- Fengia Rohdendorf, 1964
- Fergusonimyia Lopes, 1958
- Fijimyia Lopes & Kano, 1971
- Hadroxena Whitmore, Buenaventura & Pape, 2018
- Hardyella Lopes, 1959
- Harpagophalla Rohdendorf, 1937
- Harpagophalloides Rohdendorf, 1963
- Helicophagella Enderlein, 1928
- Heteronychia Brauer & Bergenstamm, 1889
- Hoa Rohdendorf, 1937
- Hosarcophaga Shinonaga & Tumrasvin, 1979
- Hyperacanthisca Rohdendorf, 1963
- Ihosyia Verves, 1989
- Iranihindia Rohdendorf, 1961
- Johnsonimima Kano & Lopes, 1971
- Johnstonimyia Lopes, 1959
- Kalshovenella Baranov, 1941
- Kanoa Rohdendorf, 1965
- Kanomyia Shinonaga & Tumrasvin, 1979
- Kozlovea Rohdendorf, 1937
- Kramerea Rohdendorf, 1937
- Krameromyia Verves, 1982
- Leucomyia Brauer & von Bergenstamm, 1891
- Lipoptilocnema Townsend, 1934
- Lioplacella Enderlein, 1928
- Lioproctia Enderlein, 1928
- Liopygia Enderlein, 1928
- Liosarcophaga Enderlein, 1928
- Macabiella Lehrer, 1994
- Mandalania Lehrer, 1994
- Mauritiella Verves, 1989
- Mehria Enderlein, 1928
- Mimarhopocnemis Rohdendorf, 1937
- Mindanaoa Lopes & Kano, 1979
- Mufindia Verves, 1990
- Myorhina Robineau-Desvoidy, 1830
- Neobellieria Blanchard, 1939
- Neosarcophaga Shewell, 1996
- Nesbittia Verves, 1989
- Nigerimyia Verves, 1989
- Nihonea Rohdendorf, 1965
- Notoecus Stein, 1924
- Nudicerca Rohdendorf, 1965
- Nuzzaciella Lehrer, 1994
- Nyikamyia Lehrer, 1994
- Pandelleana Rohdendorf, 1937
- Pandelleisca Rohdendorf, 1937
- Paraethiopisca Zumpt, 1972
- Parasarcophaga Johnston & Tiegs, 1921
- Petuniophalla Lehrer, 1994
- Phalacrodiscus Enderlein, 1928
- Phallantha Rohdendorf, 1938
- Phallanthisca Rohdendorf, 1965
- Phallocheira Rohdendorf, 1937
- Phallonychia Verves, 1982
- Phallosphaera Rohdendorf, 1938
- Phytosarcophaga Rohdendorf, 1937
- Poecilometopa Villeneuve, 1913
- Poeciphaoides Rohdendorf, 1963
- Prionophalla Rohdendorf, 1963
- Pseudaethiopisca Verves, 1989
- Pseudothyrsocnema Rohdendorf, 1937
- Pterolobomyia Lehrer, 1992
- Pterophalla Rohdendorf, 1965
- Pterosarcophaga Ye, 1981
- Robineauella Enderlein, 1928
- Rohdendorfisca Ye, 1981
- Rosellea Rohdendorf, 1937
- Sabiella Verves, 1990
- Sarcophaga Meigen, 1826
- Sarcorohdendorfia Baranov, 1938
- Sarcosolomonia Baranov, 1938
- Sarcotachinella Townsend, 1892
- Scotathyrsia Enderlein, 1937
- Sinonipponia Rohdendorf, 1959
- Sisyhelicobia Zumpt, 1972
- Stackelbergeola Boris Rohdendorf, 1937
- Takanoa Boris Rohdendorf, 1965
- Takaraia Kano & Field, 1963
- Taylorimyia Lopes, 1959
- Thyrsocnema Enderlein, 1928
- Tolucamyia Dodge, 1965
- Torgopampa Lopes, 1975
- Transvaalomyia Lehrer, 1992
- Tuberomembrana Fan, 1981
- Uroxanthisca Rohdendorf, 1963
- Varirosellea Xue, 1979
- Wohlfahrtiopsis Townsend, 1917
- Xanthopterisca Rohdendorf, 1963
- Ziminisca Rohdendorf, 1965
- Zombanella Lehrer, 1992
- Zumptiopsis Lehrer & Lehrer, 1992
- Zumptisca Rohdendorf, 1963

== See also ==
List of Sarcophaga species
