= Sarcoptes equi =

Scientific classification
- Kingdom: Animalia
- Phylum: Arthropoda
- Subphylum: Chelicerata
- Class: Arachnida
- Order: Sarcoptiformes
- Family: Sarcoptidae
- Genus: Sarcoptes
- Species: S. equi

Binomial name
- Sarcoptes equi Raspail, 1834

Species of mite

Sarcoptes equi is a species of mites belonging to the genus Sarcoptes. The species primarily infests horses and their riders. As with many other members of Sarcoptes, the species is known to cause scabies.
