= Veterinary Parasitology (journal) =

- Discipline: Veterinary parasitology
- Language: English
- Edited by: Andy Greer, Martin K. Nielsen, Michael P. Reichel, Theo de Waal

Publication details
- History: 1975–present
- Publisher: Elsevier
- Frequency: 12/year
- Impact factor: 2.738 (2020)

Standard abbreviations
- ISO 4: Vet. Parasitol.

Indexing
- CODEN: VPARDI
- ISSN: 0304-4017 (print); 1873-2550 (web)
- OCLC no.: 01939255

Links
- Journal homepage; Online access

Veterinary Parasitology is a peer-reviewed scientific journal in the discipline of veterinary parasitology. It is the official organ of the American Association of Veterinary Parasitologists, the European Veterinary Parasitology College, and the World Association for the Advancement of Veterinary Parasitology.
