= Notoedres =

Scientific classification
- Kingdom: Animalia
- Phylum: Arthropoda
- Subphylum: Chelicerata
- Class: Arachnida
- Order: Sarcoptiformes
- Family: Sarcoptidae
- Genus: Notoedres; Railliet, 1893

Genus of mites

Notoedres is a genus of mites belonging to the family Sarcoptidae.

The genus has cosmopolitan distribution.

Species:

- Notoedres alepis (Robin & Lanquetin)
- Notoedres cati (Hering, 1838)
- Notoedres centrifera Jansen, 1963
- Notoedres chiropteralis (Trouessart, 1896)
- Notoedres cuniculi (Gerlach)
- Notoedres miniopteri Fain, 1959
- Notoedres muris (Mégnin, 1877)
- Notoedres musculii (Kraemer, 1865)
