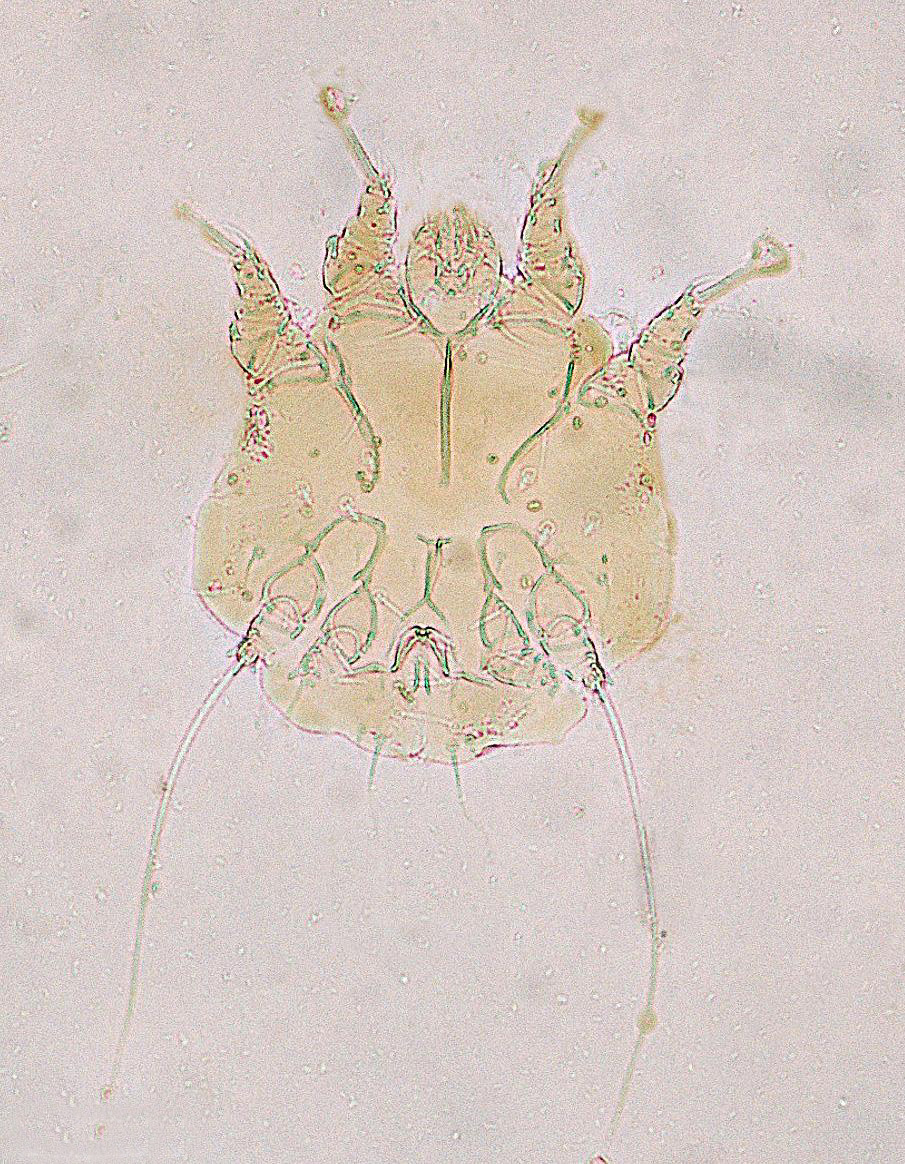

Scientific classification
- Domain: Eukaryota
- Kingdom: Animalia
- Phylum: Arthropoda
- Subphylum: Chelicerata
- Class: Arachnida
- Order: Sarcoptiformes
- Family: Sarcoptidae
- Genus: Notoedres
- Species: N. cati

Binomial name
- Notoedres cati (Hering, 1838)

Synonyms
- Sarcoptes cati Hering, 1838

= Notoedric mange =

Skin disease caused by parasitic mites

Notoedric mange, also referred to as Feline scabies, is a highly contagious skin infestation caused by an ectoparasitic and skin burrowing mite Notoedres cati (Acarina, Sarcoptidae). N. cati is primarily a parasite of felids, but it can also infest rodents, lagomorphs, and occasionally also dogs and foxes. This skin disease also has zoonotic potential. Infestation is also called acariasis, which refers to a rash that is caused by mites.

== Signs and symptoms ==
Infestation of N. cati causes several symptoms such as severe itchiness, alopecia, scales and characteristic dry, crusted, pruritic lesions that first appear in the region of the ears and rapidly spreads over the face, eyelids, neck and continues to infest the whole body. Clinical symptoms appear within the incubation period, which is most commonly 10 days to 8 weeks after transmission has happened from contact with an infested animal. Skin will become thickened and colour of crusting will change yellowish or grey as the parasitic disease progresses. Self-trauma because of severe itching can cause excoriations to develop severe dermatitis, secondary bacterial infections. Far progressed Notoedric mange often leads to apathy, anorexia and even death. In humans, infestation of N.cati can result in transient pruritic lesions.

== Cause ==
Notoedric mange is caused by the sarcoptic mite Notoedres cati that belongs to the family Sarcoptidae that consists of the burrowing mites. N. cati burrows its way through the skin of the host animal, which results in intense itching. Characteristic symptoms for Notoedric mange result from an allergic reaction of the host's body against the mites' extracellular products and also of the mechanical damage resulting from burrowing through skin.

== Diagnosis ==
There are several conditions that veterinarians usually first rule out when diagnosing Notoedric mange. These out ruled conditions can be for example; otoacariasis, atopic dermatitis, pemphigus, food hypersensitivity, autoimmune diseases and systemic lupus erythematosus. Otoacariasis is a rare infestation of the ear canal, which can be caused by different types of mites and ticks.

Most commonly N. cati as a cause of Notoedric mange may be diagnosed from a skin scraping sample with a direct microscopic identification of the mite, because there are a large number of mites present on the skin. Characteristic and systemic symptoms of Notoedric mange also help with diagnosis.

== Contagion ==
This parasitic skin disease is highly contagious and it is primarily transferred by direct contact with an infested animal. N. cati can survive for 1–3 days outside a host, and during that time the mite can transfer to another animal.

== Treatment ==
Certain antiparasitic drugs used to control Notoedric mange include selamectin, moxidectin, ivermectin and lime sulfur dips. Lime sulfur is most commonly used and safe pesticide to control Notoedric mange on cats. Treated cats should not be allowed to groom before their coat is fully dried after treatment, because lime sulfur can cause toxicity if it is orally ingested. Lime sulfur is also commonly used along the side of Notoedres as a treatment for Sarcoptes, Demodex, Cheyletiella, Lynxacarus, chiggers and lice infections.

== See also ==
- Mange
- Sarcoptes scabiei
- Demodicosis
- Lime sulfur
