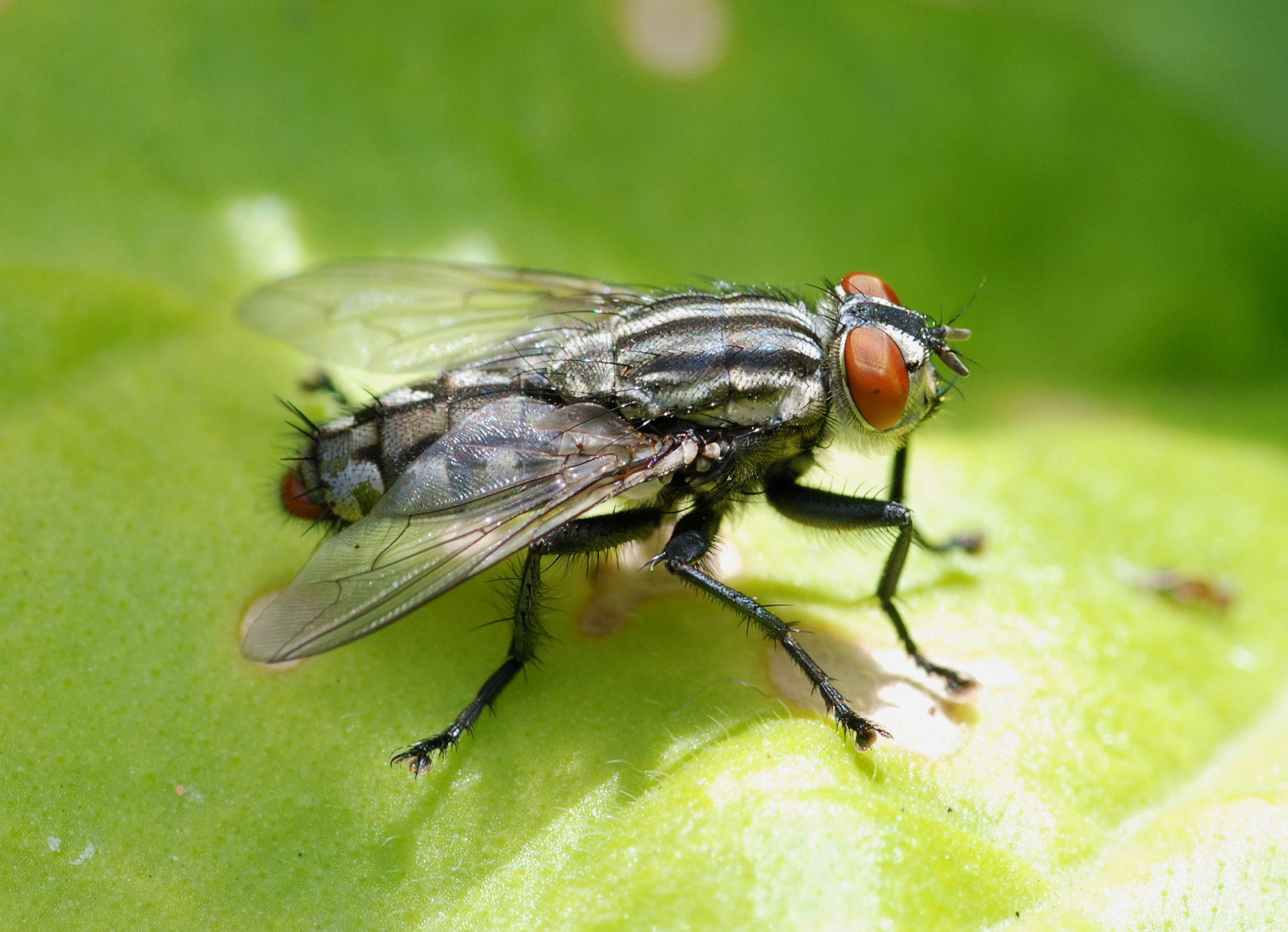
- Sarcophaga africa on a leaf in Portugal

Scientific classification
- Kingdom: Animalia
- Phylum: Arthropoda
- Clade: Pancrustacea
- Class: Insecta
- Order: Diptera
- Family: Sarcophagidae
- Genus: Sarcophaga
- Subgenus: Bercaea
- Species: S. africa

Binomial name
- Sarcophaga africa Wiedemann 1824

Synonyms
- Mesothrysia madagascariensis Enderlein, 1928; Musca haemorroidalis Fallén, 1816; Sarcophaga cruentata Meigen, 1826; Sarcophaga geogina Weidemann, 1830; Sarcophaga nurus Rondani, 1860

= Sarcophaga africa =

Species of fly

Sarcophaga (Bercaea) africa is a species of fly belonging to the family Sarcophagidae, the flesh-flies. It is the best known species in its genus. S. africa feeds on living and dead tissue, including snails, and other decomposing matter, and feces.

Sarcophaga africa is a synanthropic species known to cause myiasis in humans and livestock. The species is considered useful in forensic entomology due to this quality. S. africa is coprophagus, lays eggs in feces, and can be cultured from human and animal feces. The fly also lays eggs in decaying flesh and can be cultured from the decaying matter.
