= Sarcophaga aldrichi =

Scientific classification
- Kingdom: Animalia
- Phylum: Arthropoda
- Class: Insecta
- Order: Diptera
- Family: Sarcophagidae
- Genus: Sarcophaga
- Species: S. aldrichi

Binomial name
- Sarcophaga aldrichi Parker, 1916

Synonyms
- Arachnidomyia aldrichi (Parker, 1916)

Species of fly

Sarcophaga aldrichi, the friendly fly or large flesh fly, is a fly that is a parasitoid of the forest tent caterpillar. It strongly resembles the house fly but is in a different family, the Sarcophagidae, or flesh-flies. It is a little larger than the house fly, and has the same three black stripes on its thorax. It has red eyes, a grayish body, and a checkered abdomen.

In early summer it emerges from pupae in the ground and seeks out forest tent caterpillar cocoons, where it deposits live larvae which bore into the cocoons and feed on the pupating insects, killing them. Eventually the fly maggots drop to the ground and pupate and go dormant over the winter.

Population explosions of this species usually occur during the summer following the one when the caterpillars are plentiful. The friendly fly can be a nuisance, but they don't bite, nor do they spread disease.
