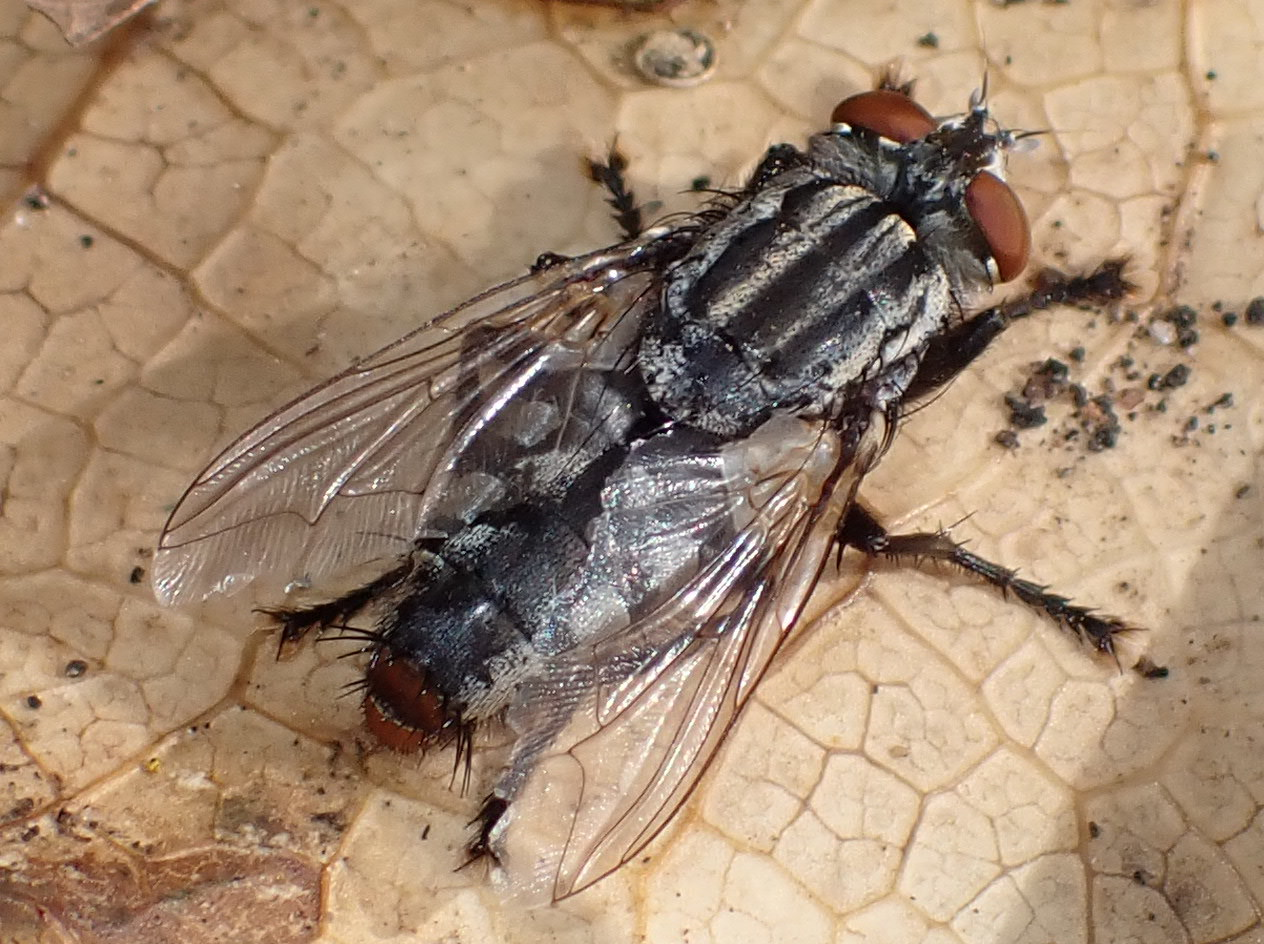

Scientific classification
- Kingdom: Animalia
- Phylum: Arthropoda
- Class: Insecta
- Order: Diptera
- Family: Sarcophagidae
- Genus: Sarcophaga
- Species: S. crassipalpis

Binomial name
- Sarcophaga crassipalpis Macquart, 1839

= Sarcophaga crassipalpis =

Species of fly

Sarcophaga crassipalpis is a species of flesh flies (insects in the family Sarcophagidae.

It is a common laboratory animal used in the study of gene expression and the study of diapause in insects.

Sarcophaga crassipalpis conforms to the basic bilateral symmetry body plan for arthropods and insects by possessing jointed-appendages, a sclerotized external cuticle, and an internal muscular system that functions as levers for movement. The six legs possess a tarsus, or foot, with a pair of claws for gripping rough surfaces. Beneath the claws is a fleshy, glandular adhesive pad called a pulvillus, which is used on smooth surfaces.

Sarcophaga crassipalpis is an insect in the order Diptera, meaning “two-winged”. As with other flies, S. crassipalpis has one pair of wings used for flying. Posterior to the wings is a small pair of knob-like structures (called halteres), which function as organs of balance.

Like other dipterans, S. crassipalpis reproduces utilizing complete metamorphosis, i.e. the life cycle consists of the following stages: egg, larva (called a maggot), pupa, and adult.

Most notably, S. crassipalpis will enter diapause under very specific environmental stimuli. Photoperiod exposure received by embryos in the uterus is one factor in initiating diapause. It is sensitive to specific environmental stimuli in its early larval stage and then enters diapause as a pupa. Sarcophaga crassipalpis enters an overwintering pupal diapause in response to cues of a short day-length received during late embryonic and early larval life. Diapause in S. crassipalpis is not a complete cessation of gene expression. It is a separate developmental pathway that is expressed by another set of genes. It lays its eggs in open flesh wounds, typically the wounds of livestock. Pesticides have been designed to interfere with the normal development, killing only larva.
