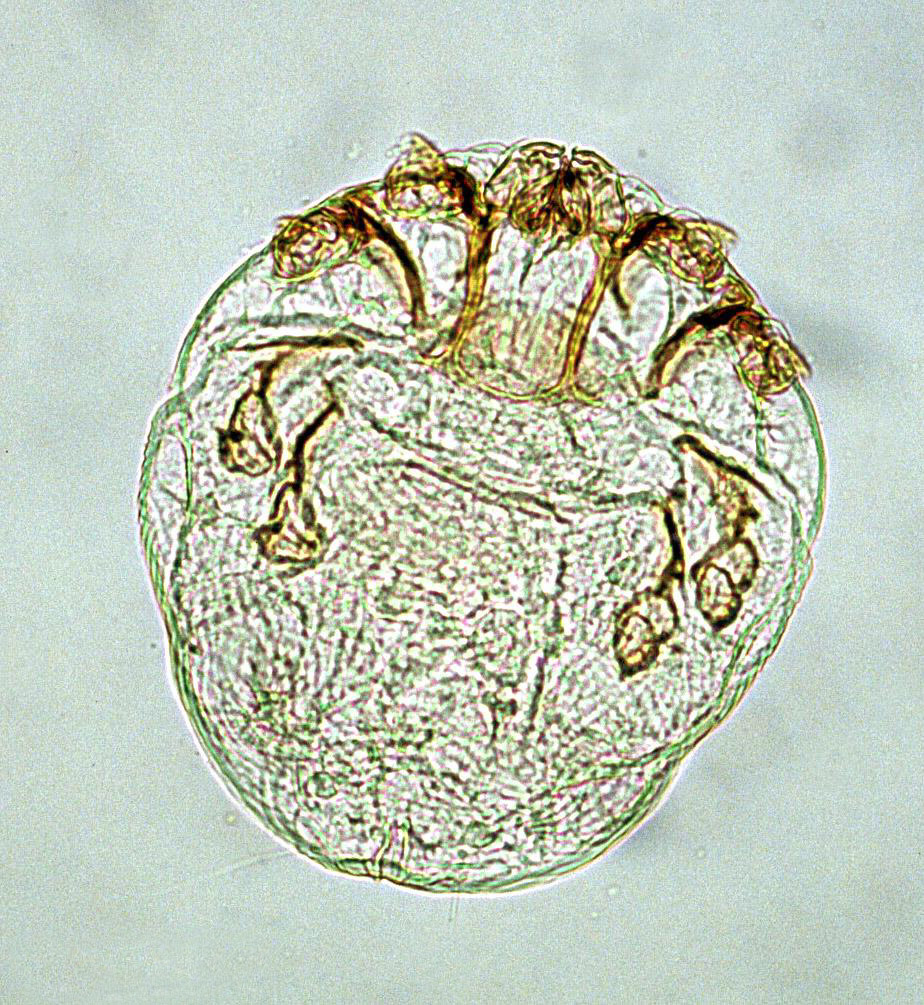

Scientific classification
- Domain: Eukaryota
- Kingdom: Animalia
- Phylum: Arthropoda
- Subphylum: Chelicerata
- Class: Arachnida
- Order: Sarcoptiformes
- Family: Epidermoptidae
- Subfamily: Knemidokoptinae
- Genus: Knemidokoptes; Fürstenberg, 1870

Species
- Knemidokoptes pilae Knemidokoptes mutans

Synonyms
- Cnemidocoptes Cambridge, 1875; Cnemidocoptes Lavoipierre & Griffiths, 1951; Knemidocoptes Oudemans, 1898

= Knemidokoptes =

Genus of mite

Knemidokoptes is a genus of parasitic mites in the family Epidermoptidae that infect the skin or feather follicles of birds, especially gallinaceous birds (chickens, pheasants, and relatives) as well as parakeets and canaries. Infection commonly causes scaly lesions to form at the face or feet, which is known as knemidocoptiasis.

It was formerly placed in the family Knemidokoptidae, which is now treated as a subfamily with 15 species grouped in six genera.

== Species ==
- Knemidokoptes mutans - also known as the scaly leg mite
- Knemidokoptes pilae - scaly face mite
