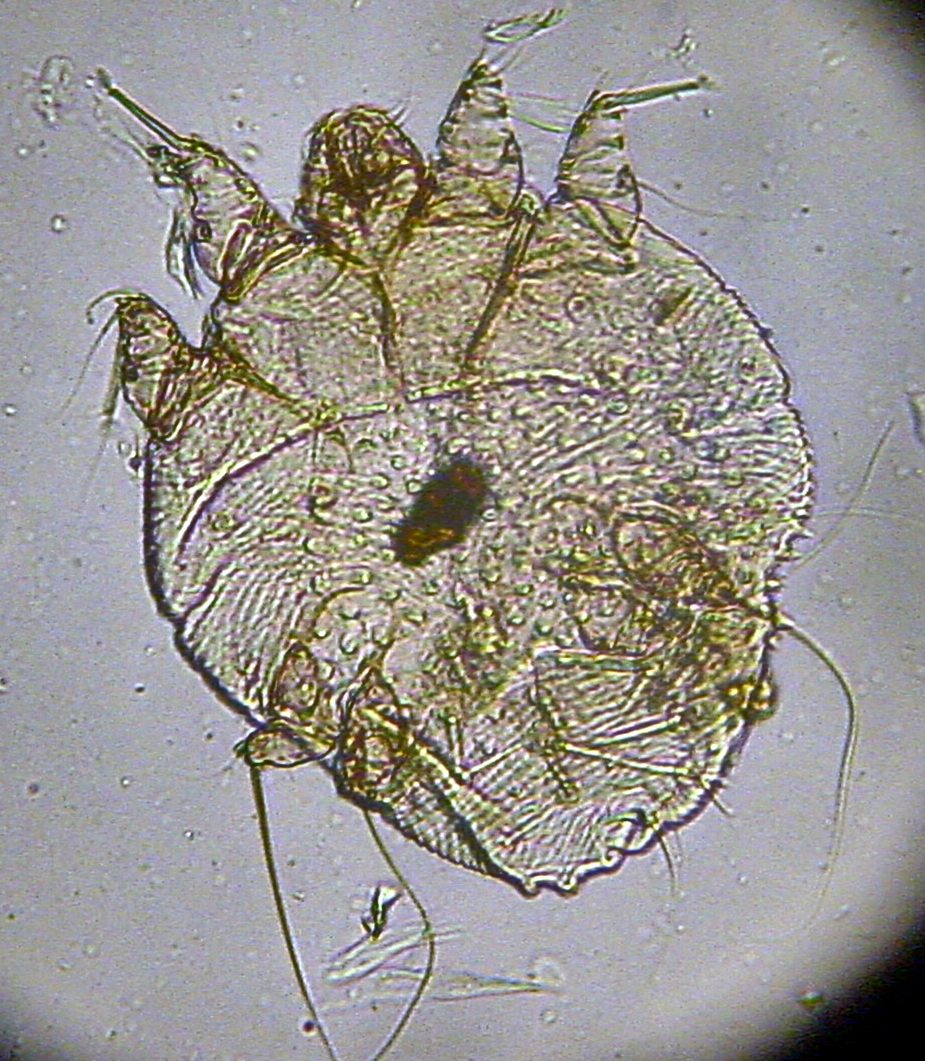
- Sarcoptes scabei

Scientific classification
- Kingdom: Animalia
- Phylum: Arthropoda
- Subphylum: Chelicerata
- Class: Arachnida
- Order: Sarcoptiformes
- Family: Sarcoptidae
- Genus: Sarcoptes

= Sarcoptes =

Genus of arachnids

Sarcoptes is a genus of mites.

In some contexts, the types are all considered subordinate to Sarcoptes scabiei.

- Sarcoptes scabiei var. bovis
- S. s. var. canis
- S. s. var. caprae
- S. s. var. equi
- S. s. var. hominis
- S. s. var. ovis
- S. s. var. suis

In other cases, as with S. equi and S. anthracis, these are sometimes considered distinct species.

Most types primarily infect only one host animal, with bovis, canis, caprae, equi, hominis, ovis and suis meaning cow, dog, goat, horse, human, sheep, and pig in Latin. The type var. ovis primarily infests sheep but can infest other hooved cattle. Dogs are the primary host of var. canis but similar animals like foxes can catch it. Humans can only become infested with var. hominis. Mites of other types may crawl onto human skin and cause temporary irritation but they are incapable of successfully reproducing to cause an infestation.

The term Sarcoptes canis appears in older references, but is now usually described as Sarcoptes scabiei var. canis or Sarcoptes scabiei canis.
