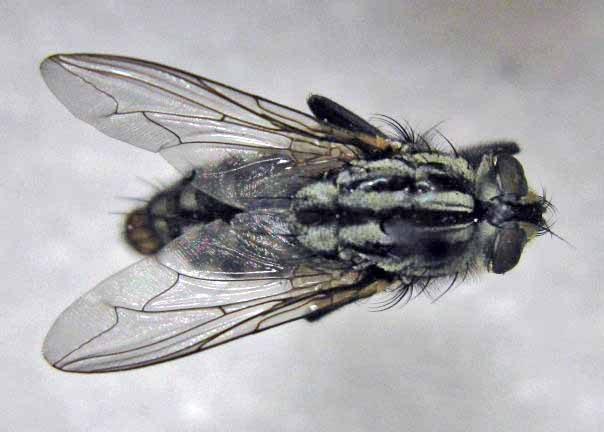
- Sarcophaga pernix

Scientific classification
- Kingdom: Animalia
- Phylum: Arthropoda
- Clade: Pancrustacea
- Class: Insecta
- Order: Diptera
- Family: Sarcophagidae
- Genus: Sarcophaga
- Species: S. pernix

Binomial name
- Sarcophaga pernix Harris, 1780

Synonyms
- Musca striata Fabricius, 1794; Musca haemorrhoidalis Fallén, 1817; Sarcophaga haemorrhoidalis (Fallén, 1817); Sarcophaga haematodes Meigen, 1826; Myophora hemisphaerica Robineau-Desvoidy, 1830; Myophora limpidipennis Robineau-Desvoidy, 1830; Myophora horticola Robineau-Desvoidy, 1830; Myophora campestris Robineau-Desvoidy, 1830; Pierretia parva Robineau-Desvoidy, 1863; Ravinia hebes Robineau-Desvoidy, 1863; Ravinia sulcata Robineau-Desvoidy, 1863; Ravinia ctenodasypygiina Enderlein, 1928; Sarcophaga aozia Séguy, 1935; Gesneriodes disjuncta Séguy, 1938; Sarcophaga azoa Lopes et al., 1977; Sarcophaga haemisphaerica Verves, 1986

= Sarcophaga pernix =

Species of fly

Sarcophaga pernix, also known as the red-tailed flesh fly, is a fly in the Sarcophagidae family. This fly often breeds in carrion and feces, making it a possible vector for disease. The larvae of this species can cause myiasis, as well as accidental myiasis. It is potentially useful in forensic entomology.

== Taxonomy ==
Sarcophaga pernix was first described by Moses Harris, an English entomologist, in 1780.

Sarcophaga haemorrhoidalis was first described by Carl Fredrik Fallén (1764–1830), a Swedish botanist and entomologist, in 1817 during his tenure at Lund University between 1814 and 1827. Fallén first named this species Musca haemorrhoidalis in 1817 not knowing that Charles Joseph de Villers had already named an unrelated species Musca haemorrhoidalis in 1789. In 1826, Johann Wilhelm Meigen, a German entomologist famous for his pioneering work on Diptera, described the same species that Fallén had described in 1817 as Sarcophaga cruentata following Meigen's description of the genus Sarcophaga. Since two different species can not share the same name, the Sarcophaga cruentata that Meigen coined would serve as the species name. According to Wharton, the exact nomenclature of this species is dynamic and currently has two accepted names: Sarcophaga haemorrhoidalis and Bercaea cruentata. Thomas Pape, who is considered to be the world's foremost expert on Sarcophagidae uses Sarcophaga but has assigned several subgenera, including Bercaea. Some current workers, including Ferrar, use Bercaea haemorrhoidalis.

== Description ==
Sarcophagidae is the dipteran family commonly known as flesh flies, comprising approximately 2000 species. Many species of Sarcophagidae prefer to breed in carrion over other mediums, but there are several species that breed in dung. A large number of species are parasitoids or cleptoparasitoids and never breed in carrion. It is difficult to identify the S. pernix species unless genitalia can be observed. Only males can be identified and classified within the genus. Sarcophagids are rather large in size ranging from 4 to 23 mm, (adults of S. pernix vary in size from 7 to 14 mm). Distinguishing characteristics include a checkerboard like pattern on the abdomen, stripes on the thorax and red eyes. Flesh flies are attracted to anything rotting, including feces. Sarcophagidae are unimpeded by rain and fly in any weather. Because of this trait, Sarcophagidae will often be the first flies to colonize a corpse after an extended period of rain. Flesh flies appear to prefer sunlight over shaded conditions. Sarcophaga pernix (Bercaea cruentata) is one of the most common species of Sarcophagidae recovered from indoor crime scenes in the United States.

== Life cycle ==
All members of the family Sarcophagidae are larviparous or ovoviviparous. Sarcophaga pernix (Bercaea cruentata) gives live birth to larvae with the female retaining the egg case in her abdomen. Flesh flies are strongly attracted to carrion or dry flesh. The female has a strong desire to lay larvae on the flesh and have even been noted to larviposit on the sleeve of a garment that has been previously soiled with blood. Oldroyd states that the larvae of Sarcophaga spp are voracious and will take anything of animal origin be it alive or dead. A larva is forced out of the larvipositor usually head first and soon disappears into the food material. Once larvae are deposited as 1st stage instars, rapid development follows with 3rd instars usually being achieved by three to four days. Larviposition to adulthood generally takes around two weeks.

If the fly is forced to hibernate due to temperate climates, it will do so in the pupal stage.

== Importance ==
=== Medical importance ===
Due to its attraction to feces and carrion, S. pernix has been accounted for as a dipteran species that may serve as a mechanical vector for disease, especially if it intrudes homes. The family Sarcophagidae is particularly attracted to human food and filth. Bacteria can be transferred physically from the fly's body, legs, or proboscis, to an animal, human food, or open sores. S. pernix has also been found to carry polio virus. During a 1914 polio epidemic, samples of the virus were collected from S. pernix, among other dipterans. The sample was used to infect a monkey with polio, showing that it was an active virus. However, there is still no conclusive evidence as to whether or not this species actually transmits diseases to humans or animals.

The larvae of S. pernix may produce myiasis on necrotic or dead flesh. The first case of auricular myiasis (on the outer ear) on a human was reported in Iran in 1974. Other myiasis cases have been recorded around the world in both humans and animals. Examples range from aural myiasis caused by S. pernix in four children in Israel (from 1990 to 1993) that produced symptoms of ear discharge, otalgia and itching, to the infection of a schnauzer in Umbria, Italy in 1994 by S. pernix maggots.

Accidental myiasis can also be caused by S. pernix larvae. When meat contaminated with live larvae is eaten, the maggots can make their way into the gastrointestinal tract and infest the intestines. The larvae are usually excreted with the feces. In one documented case of gastrointestinal myiasis, a patient was admitted into a neurology clinic, and after several days, maggots were found in his stool. They were identified as S. pernix through taxonomical means. The accidental myiasis did not contribute to or cause the patient's illness. Because S. pernix rarely invades living tissue, cases such as this are not seen often.

=== Forensic importance ===
S. pernix is hardly ever used in forensic investigations, due to its global distribution and the fact that little is known about them. Usually, other more researched flies and beetles, if present on the body, take precedence. The fly has a pupation time ranging from 93 hours to 153 hours. Development from larvae to adult can range from 252 to 802 hours. Knowing the pupation and life cycle times of S. haemorrhoidalis and taking into consideration that this species is ovoviviparous allows investigators to calculate how long the fly has been on the corpse. If time of colonization of the corpse by maggots is known, it can help determine the PMI, or post-mortem interval. The larvae of S. pernix occur on carcasses in the early and advanced stages of decomposition. The maggots can live in amphibious habitats in which many other fly species may not be able to thrive or breed, making it possible for them to be the first dipterans on a corpse in wet weather.

== Distribution ==
Afghanistan, Albania, Algeria, Armenia, Austria, Azerbaijan, Azores, Belgium, Bulgaria, Belarus, Canary Islands, China, Cyprus, Czech Republic, Denmark, Egypt, Estonia, Finland, France, Germany, Greece, Gruzia, Hungary, Iran, Iraq, Ireland, Israel, Italy, Japan, Kazakhstan, Kyrgyzstan, Latvia, Lebanon, Libya, Lithuania, Malta, Moldova, Mongolia, Morocco, North Korea, Norway, Poland, Portugal, Romania, Russia, Saudi Arabia, Serbia, Slovakia, South Korea, Spain, Sweden, Switzerland, Syria, Tajikistan, Tunisia, Turkmenistan, Ukraine, United Kingdom, Uzbekistan, Chad, Yemen, Bangladesh, Bhutan, India, Nepal, Pakistan.

Sarcophaga pernix is a common species of flesh fly that appear worldwide in distribution and is commonly found in the United States. It can be found throughout the year in the southern portion of the United States. The larvae are adaptable and can live in moist semi-aquatic habits that are unsuitable for most other fly species. Overall, S. pernix is most likely to be found in climates with higher temperatures and will prefer high temperatures throughout its entire life cycle.

== Research ==
Past research has been limited due to the name Sarcophaga pernix being attributed to many different species since Fallén initially described it. "The Classification of Townsend (1937, 1938), which divided the Sarcophagidae into six tribes, was rather confusing and contributed little to the phylogeny of the family." (Pape, 11) Although limited now, research on colonization and degree day temperature growth rates at the species level would bolster Sarcophaga pernix (Bercaea cruentata) involvement and credibility as a crime scene post mortem interval witness in forensics.

== Conclusion ==
Sarcophaga pernix (Bercaea cruentata) is an important fly with regard to human and animal health. The fly has interesting attributes particular to its family like being able to fly in the rain. This role in sometimes first colonizing corpses at crime scenes along with its capability of myiasis makes this a forensically relevant species.
