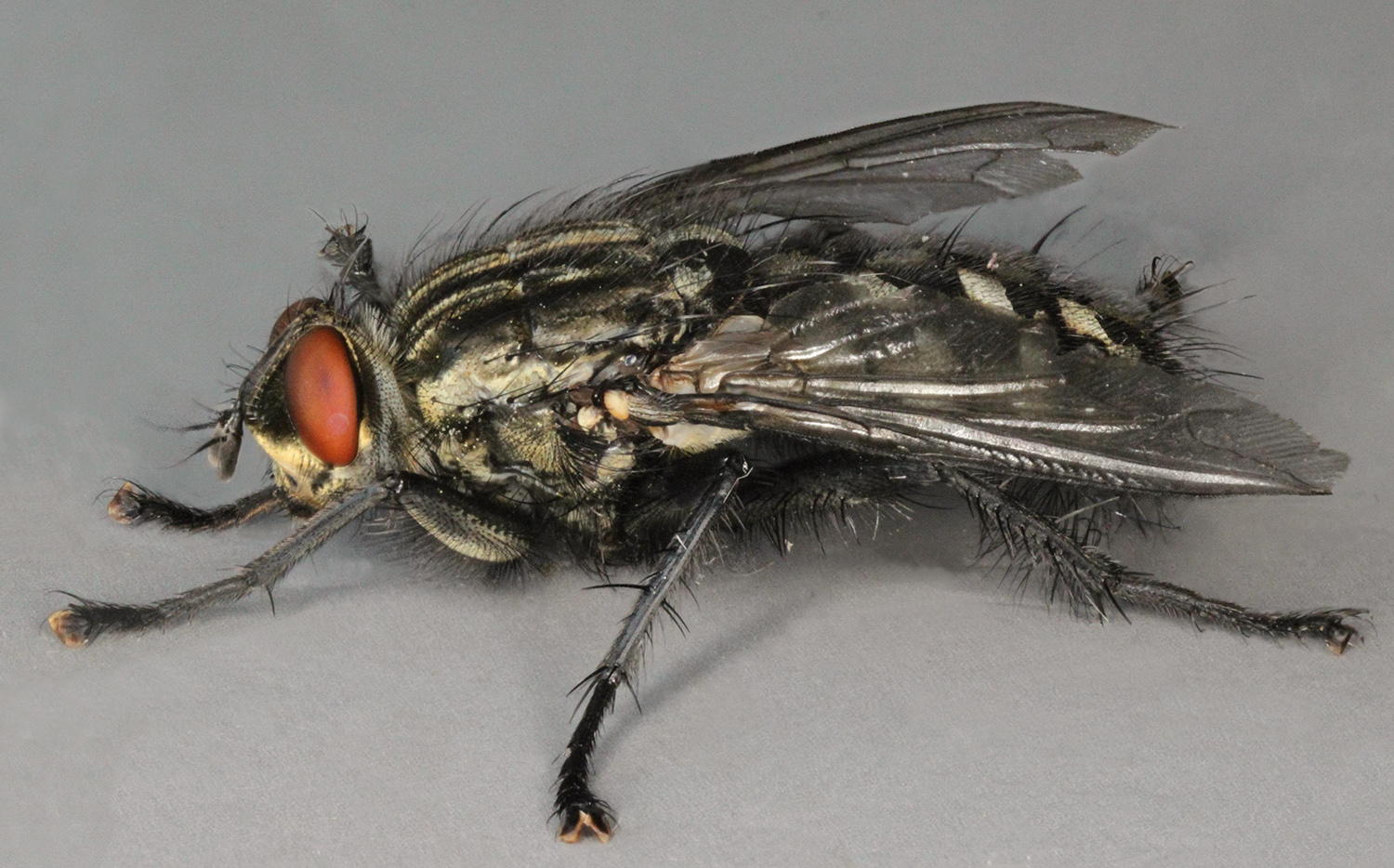

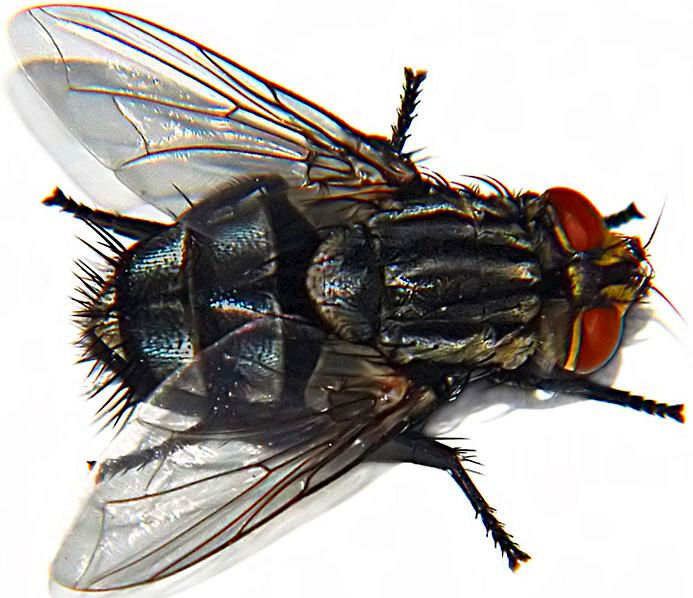
- lateral and dorsal aspects

Scientific classification
- Kingdom: Animalia
- Phylum: Arthropoda
- Clade: Pancrustacea
- Class: Insecta
- Order: Diptera
- Family: Sarcophagidae
- Subfamily: Sarcophaginae
- Genus: Sarcophaga
- Species: S. carnaria

Binomial name
- Sarcophaga carnaria (Linnaeus, 1758)

Synonyms
- Musca carnaria Linnaeus, 1758, Sarcophaga schulzi Müller, 1922; Sarcophaga vulgaris Rohdendorf, 1937; Sarcophaga dolosa Lehrer, 1967

= Sarcophaga carnaria =

Species of fly

Sarcophaga carnaria is a European species of flesh fly within the common flesh fly genus, Sarcophaga.

== Identification ==
Only males can be identified with certainty, and then only by examining genitalia.

== Biology ==
Larvae mostly feed on earthworms. Adults are attracted to rotting meat and faeces.

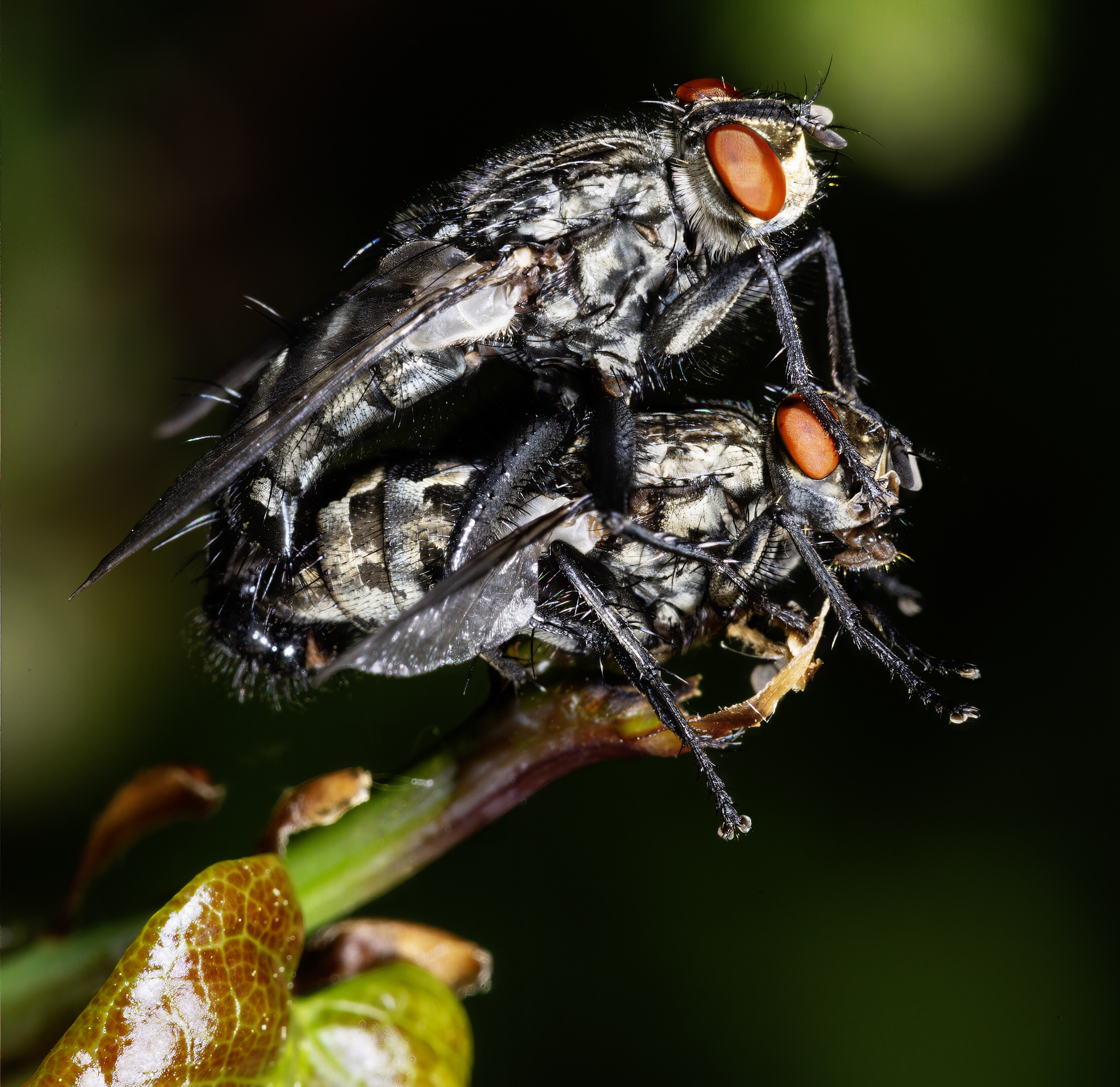
Mating

== Distribution ==
European, from the U.K. and southern Europe, east to the Altai Mountains and north to the Kola Peninsula.
