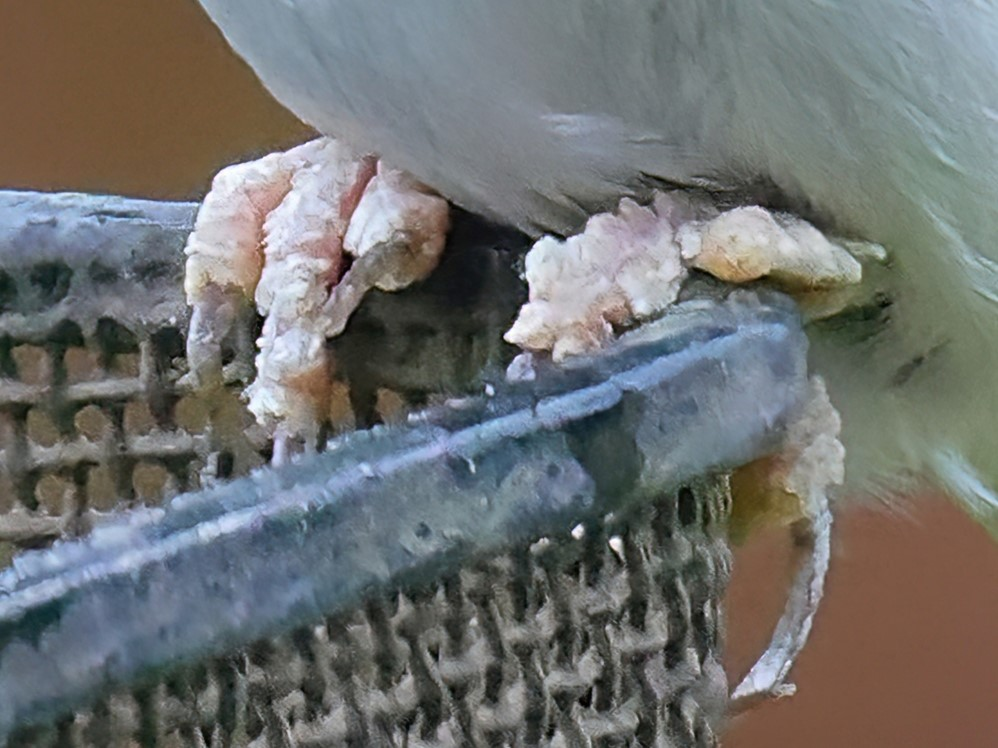
- Knemidokoptes mutans

Scientific classification
- Kingdom: Animalia
- Phylum: Arthropoda
- Subphylum: Chelicerata
- Class: Arachnida
- Order: Sarcoptiformes
- Suborder: Astigmata
- Parvorder: Psoroptidia
- Superfamily: Analgoidea
- Family: Epidermoptidae; Trouessart, 1892

Synonyms
- List: Cnemidocoptidae; Evansacaridae; Knemidocoptidae; Knemidokoptidae; Myialgesidae

= Epidermoptidae =

Family of mites

Epidermoptidae is a family of acariform mites. They live as parasites on the skin of birds and mammals. They thrive in warm, damp areas of the skin (several species are nostril specialists).

== Genera ==
The following genera are recognised in the family Epidermoptidae:

- Apocnemidocoptes Lombert, Lukoschus & Fain, 1984
- Archemyialges Mironov, Bochkov & Fain, 2005
- Congocoptes Fain, 1956
- Epidermoptes Rivolta & Delprato, 1880
- Evansacarus Fain, 1962
- Hemimyialges Mironov, Bochkov & Fain, 2005
- Knemidokoptes Fürstenberg, 1870
- Metamicrolichus Fain, 1965
- Micnemidocoptes Fain, 1974
- Microlichus Trouessart & Neumann, 1888
- Myialges Trouessart, 1906
- Neocnemidocoptes Fain, 1966
- Otocoptoides Fain & Bochkov, 2001
- Pelicanoptes Fain & Atyeo, 1975
- Picicnemidocoptes Pence, 1972
- Procnemidocoptes Fain, 1966
- Promyialges Fain, 1964
- Rallepidermoptes Fain, 1965
- Rhamphocoptes Fain, 1956
