= Scaly foot =

Parasitic disease of birds

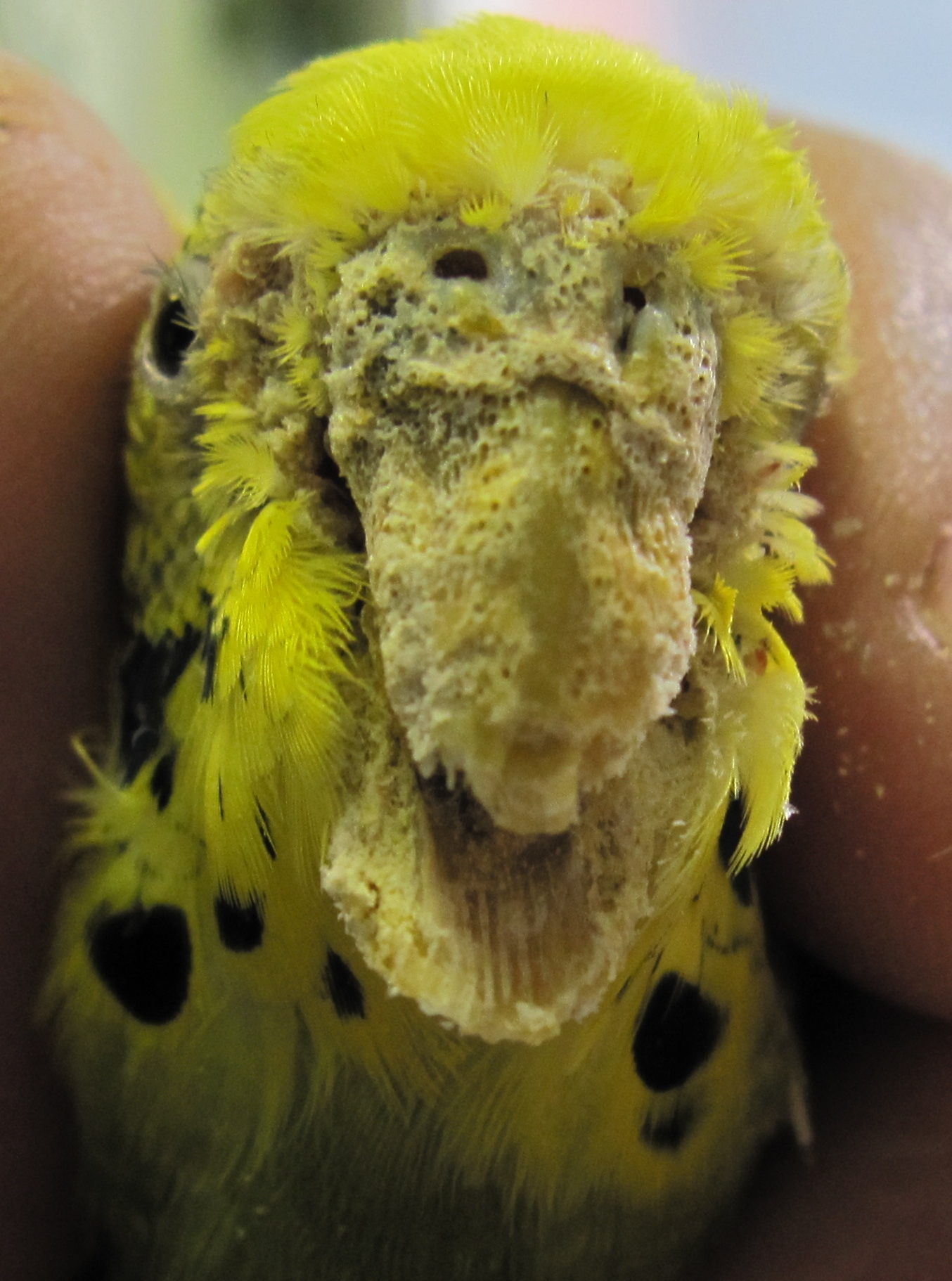
Scaly face in a budgie

Scaly foot, or knemidocoptiasis is a bird ailment that is common among caged birds and also affects many other bird species. It is caused by mites in the genus Knemidokoptes which burrow into the bird's flesh. The tunnels made by the mites within the skin cause dermatitis and scaly lesions. Scaly face is caused by the same mite responsible for scaly foot and other related mites cause depluming. The condition is transmitted from one bird to another by direct prolonged contact.

== Causes ==
Scaly foot, otherwise known as knemidocoptiasis, is caused by burrowing mites in the genus Knemidokoptes. The condition can be compared with sarcoptic mange in mammals, but does not seem to cause the same level of itching. The birds chiefly affected are galliformes (chickens and turkeys), passerines (finches, canaries, sparrows, robins, wrens), and psittacine birds (parrots, macaws, parakeets, budgerigars). The condition sometimes additionally affects piciformes (woodpeckers, toucans) and anseriformes (ducks, geese, swans), raptors and other birds. The two species of mite most often implicated are K. jamaicensis and K. intermedius. Other related species of mite affect feather follicles and cause depluming. The mites are mostly transmitted by prolonged direct contact, particularly from parent bird to unfledged nestling.

== Symptoms ==
Scaly foot causes lesions of the skin with dermatitis and thickening of the skin. Commonly known as scaly face, scaly legs, or tassel foot, knemidocoptiasis affects primarily the face and legs of birds around the world worldwide and can be fatal.

== Etymology ==
Knemidocoptic mange [neʺmĭ-do-kopʹtik mānj]

From the Latin manducare (to itch), mange is a skin disease caused by mites in domestic and wild animals. Knemidocoptic, from the Greek knemid (greave, a piece of armor that protects the leg) and koptein (to cut), refers to the morphology and pathogenesis of mites of the genus Knemidokoptes, which are burrowing mites of birds.

== See also ==
- Scaly leg

=== External links ===
- http://www3.sympatico.ca/davehansen/scaly.html - Describes the infection and treatment possibilities.
- http://veterinarymedicine.dvm360.com/knemidocoptiasis-birds - Describes the Life Cycle and Transmission pattern of the Knemidokoptes mites, disease symptoms in various bird species, diagnosis techniques, and treatments commonly used by veterinary professionals
