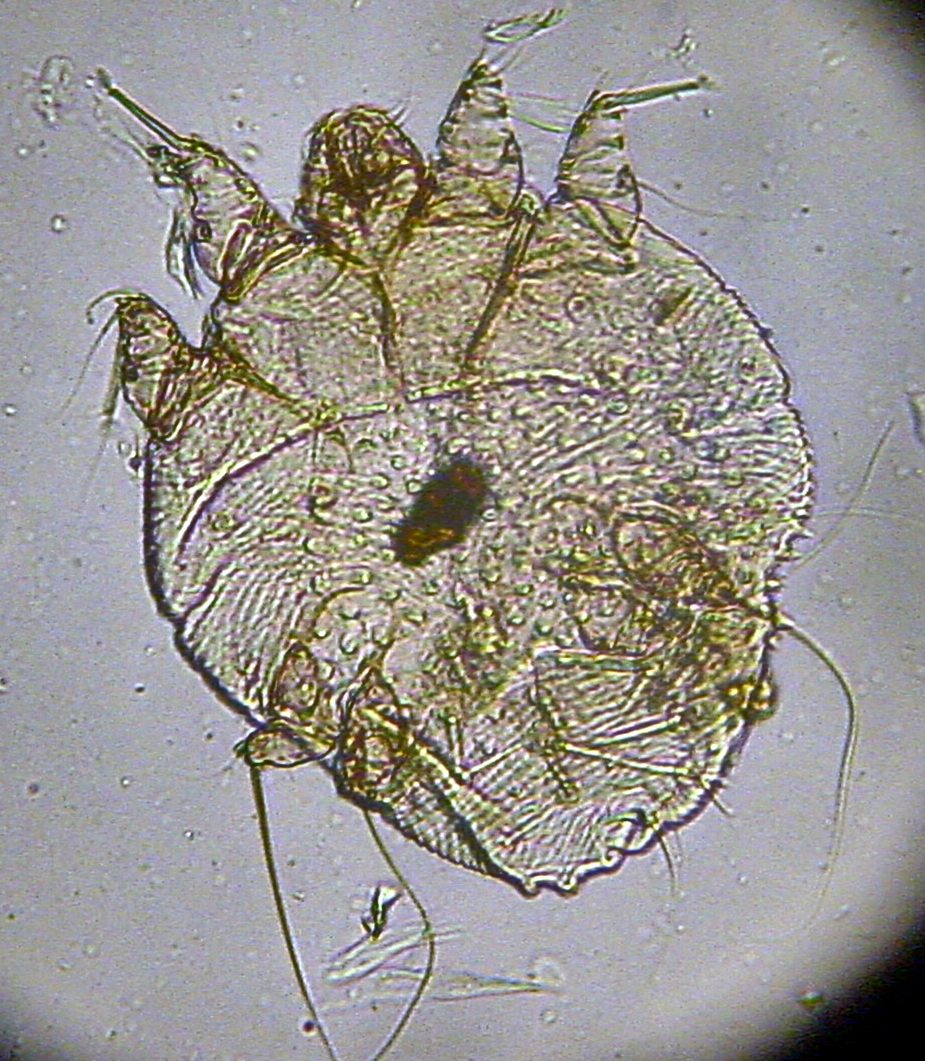
- Sarcoptes scabiei

Scientific classification
- Kingdom: Animalia
- Phylum: Arthropoda
- Subphylum: Chelicerata
- Class: Arachnida
- Order: Sarcoptiformes
- Suborder: Astigmata
- Family: Sarcoptidae

Genera include
- Notoedres; Sarcoptes

= Sarcoptidae =

Family of mites

The Sarcoptidae family of mites contains the genus Sarcoptes. Sarcoptic mange is caused by burrowing mites within this genus.
