= Johnsonia =

Johnsonia may refer to:

- Johnsonia (journal), a journal of malacology
- Johnsonia (fly), a genus of flies in the family Sarcophagidae
- Johnsonia (plant), a genus of plants in the family Asphodelaceae
