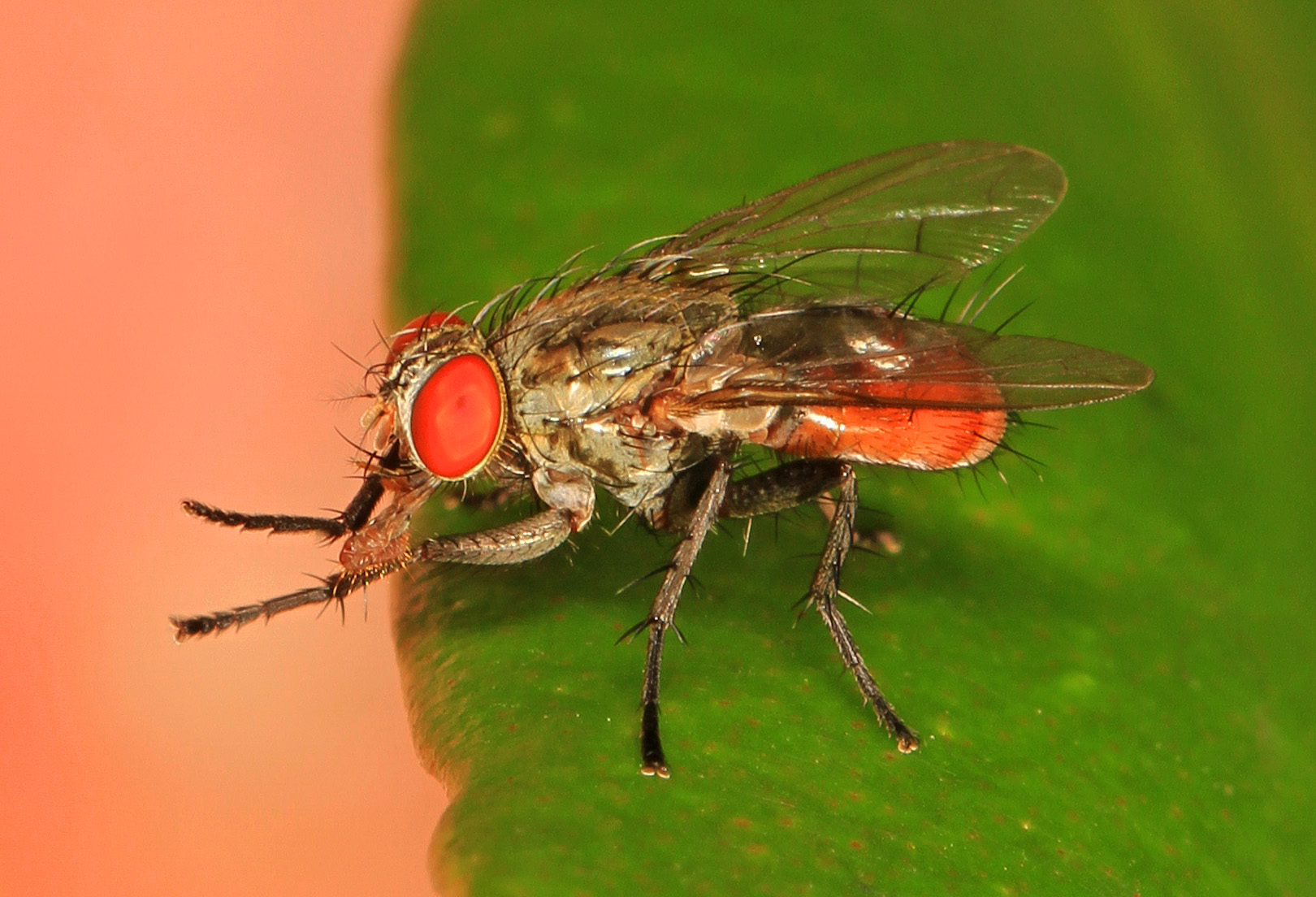
- Lepidodexia

Scientific classification
- Domain: Eukaryota
- Kingdom: Animalia
- Phylum: Arthropoda
- Class: Insecta
- Order: Diptera
- Family: Sarcophagidae
- Subfamily: Sarcophaginae
- Tribe: Johnsoniini

= Johnsoniini =

Tribe of flies

Johnsoniini is a tribe of flesh flies in the family Sarcophagidae. There are about 7 genera and 12 described species in Johnsoniini.

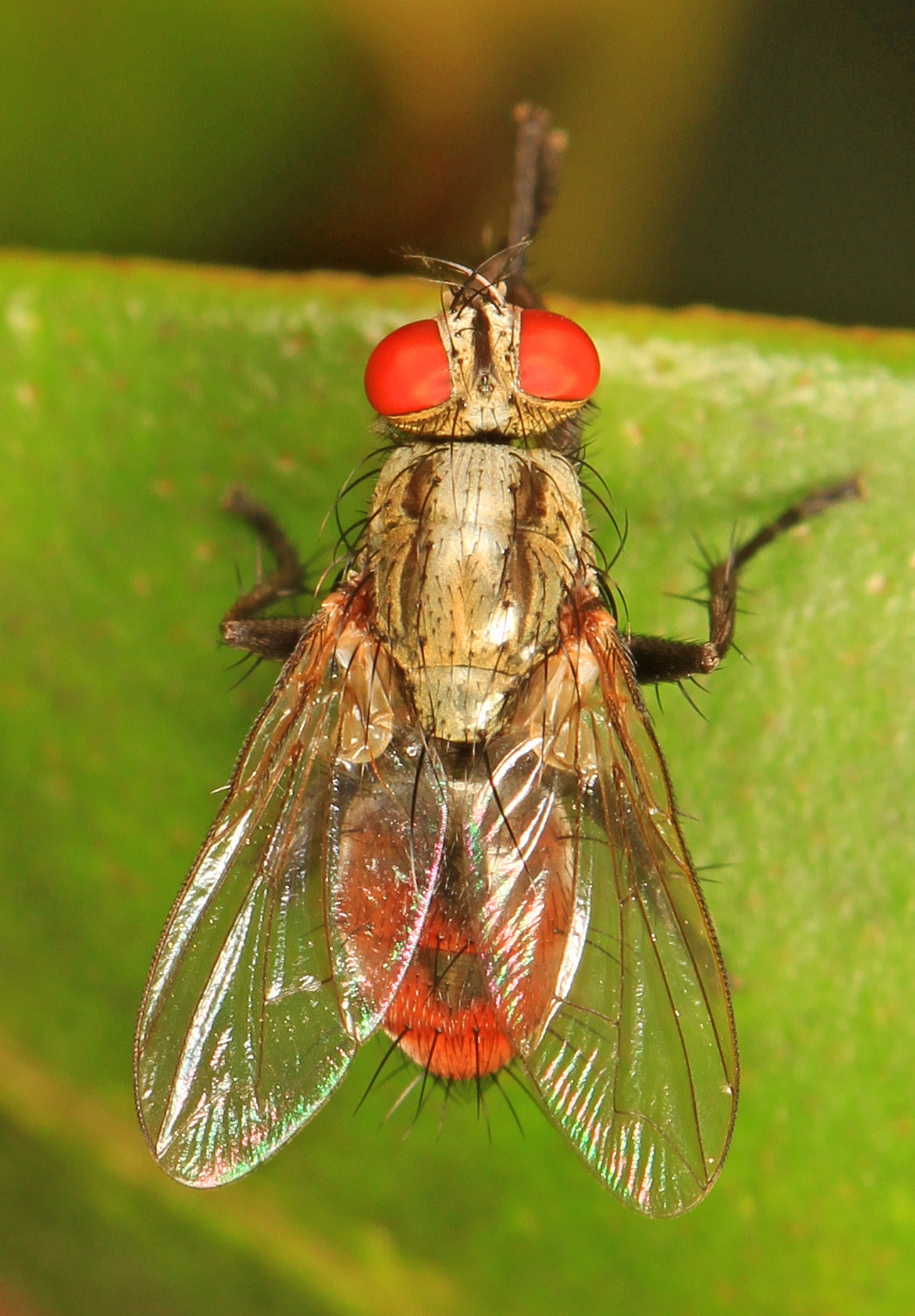
Lepidodexia

== Genera ==
These seven genera belong to the tribe Johnsoniini:

- Camptops Aldrich, 1916^{i g}
- Erucophaga Reinhard, 1963^{i g}
- Harpagopyga Aldrich, 1916^{i g}
- Johnsonia Coquillett, 1895^{i g}
- Lepidodexia Brauer & von Bergenstamm, 1891^{c g b}
- Rafaelia Townsend, 1917^{i c g b}
- Sthenopyga Aldrich, 1916^{i}

Data sources: i = ITIS, c = Catalogue of Life, g = GBIF, b = Bugguide.net
