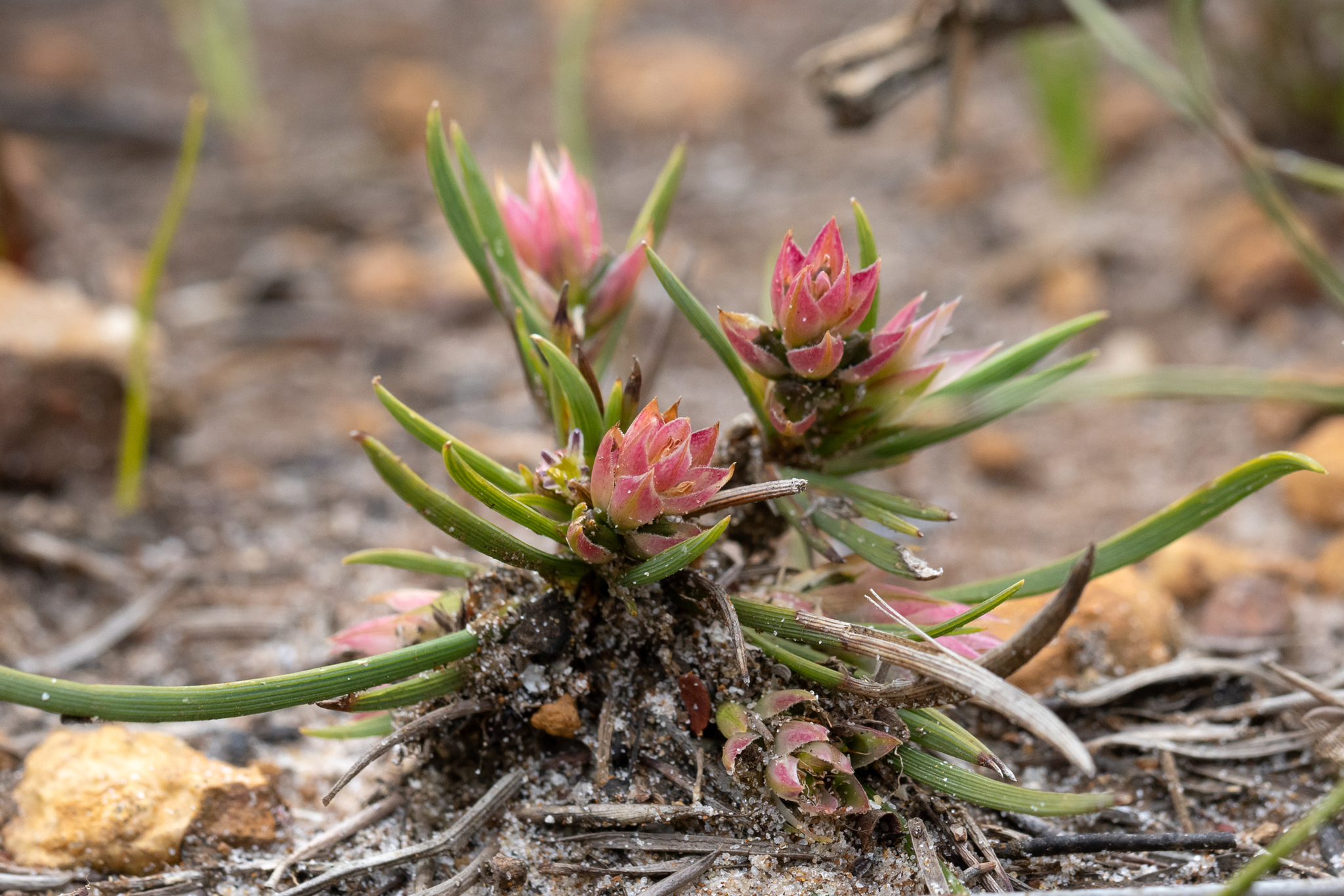
- In Cape Le Grand National Park

Scientific classification
- Kingdom: Plantae
- Clade: Tracheophytes
- Clade: Angiosperms
- Clade: Monocots
- Order: Asparagales
- Family: Asphodelaceae
- Subfamily: Hemerocallidoideae
- Genus: Johnsonia
- Species: J. acaulis

Binomial name
- Johnsonia acaulis Endl.

= Johnsonia acaulis =

Species of flowering plant

Johnsonia acaulis is a plant in the family Asphodelaceae and is endemic to the south-west of Western Australia. It is a rhizomatous, tufted, or grass-like perennial with white, pink or green flowers.

== Description ==
Johnsonia acaulis is a rhizomatous, tufted, perennial herb with grass-like leaves 55–165 mm (2.2–6.5 in) long. The flowering scape is red or green, with floral bracts 6.5–11.5 mm (0.26–0.45 in) long and 4–7 mm (0.16–0.28 in) wide. The perianth is 3–4 mm (0.12–0.16 in) long and white, pink or green, and the sepals and wider than the petals. The anthers and the style are about 2 mm (0.079 in) long. Flowering occurs from August to December and the fruit is a capsule 2–4 mm (0.079–0.157 in) long.

== Taxonomy and naming ==
Johnsonia acaulis was first described in 1846 by Stephan Endlicher in Lehmann's "Plantae Preissianae". The specific epithet acaulis means "without a stem".

== Distribution and habitat ==
This species occurs between Israelite Bay, Lake Grace and Perth in the Esperance Plains, Geraldton Sandplains, Jarrah Forest, Mallee, Swan Coastal Plain and Warren biogeographic regions of Western Australia. It grows in white, grey, or lateritic sand.
