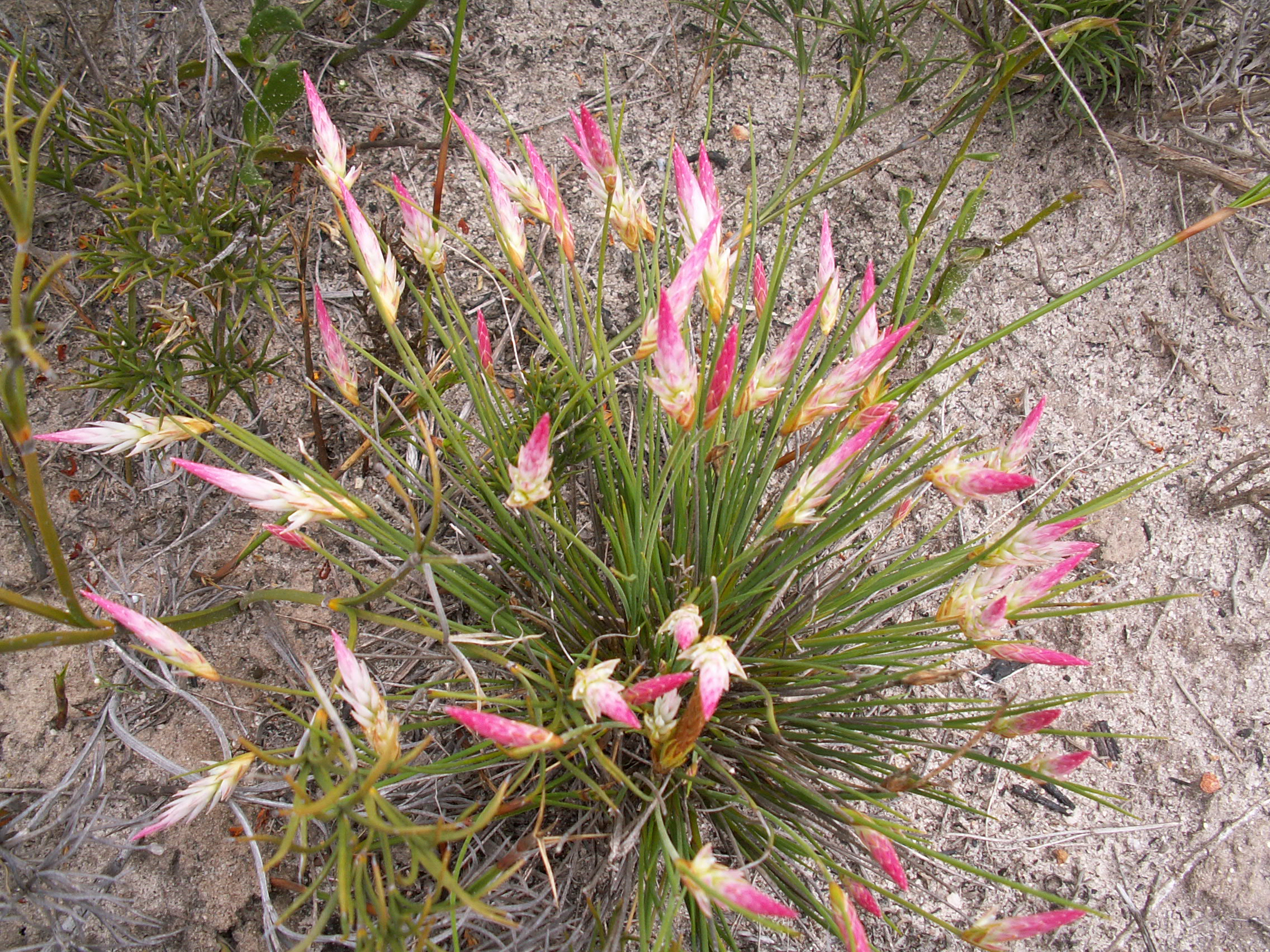
- In Lesueur National Park, Western Australia

Scientific classification
- Kingdom: Plantae
- Clade: Tracheophytes
- Clade: Angiosperms
- Clade: Monocots
- Order: Asparagales
- Family: Asphodelaceae
- Subfamily: Hemerocallidoideae
- Genus: Johnsonia
- Species: J. pubescens

Binomial name
- Johnsonia pubescens Lindl.

Synonyms
- List: Johnsonia hirta Lindl.; Johnsonia hirta var. filifolia F.Muell.; Johnsonia hirta Lindl. var. hirta; Johnsonia longifolia Endl.; Johnsonia mucronata Endl.; Johnsonia pubescens f. glabra Domin nom. illeg.; Johnsonia pubescens f. hirta (Lindl.) Domin; Johnsonia pubescens f. longibracteata Domin; Johnsonia pubescens var. filifolia (F.Muell.) Benth.; Johnsonia pubescens var. hirta (Lindl.) Baker

= Johnsonia pubescens =

Species of flowering plant

Johnsonia pubescens, commonly called the pipe lily, is a grass-like plant in the family Asphodelaceae, subfamily Hemerocallidoideae, endemic to the south-west of Western Australia. As with others in the genus, it is distinguished by its minute flowers which are on the end of a spike and hidden by large, overlapping, papery bracts.

== Description ==
Johnsonia pubescens is a rhizomatous, tufted, perennial herb with grass-like leaves which all emerge from the base of the plant. The leaves are 6.3–28 centimetres (2.5–11.0 in) long and 1–3 centimetres (0.39–1.18 in) wide. The bases of the leaves surround the stem. The flower spike is leafless, shorter than the leaves, with large, dry overlapping bracts surrounding minute flowers. The bracts are white, or white with a central pink stripe, or flushed pink. The whole plant is covered with short, soft hairs.

== Taxonomy and naming ==
Johnsonia pubescens was first described in 1840 by John Lindley in "A Sketch of the Vegetation of the Swan River Colony". He mentions, "Of Johnsonia, with its hop-like heads, there are two very pretty species, namely J. hirta ...and J. pubescens, both much smaller than the J. lupulina of the South coast." The specific epithet pubescens means "hairy".

Two species are recognised by the Australian Plant Census:

- Johnsonia pubescens subsp. cygnorum (Keighery)
- Johnsonia pubescens Lindl. subsp. pubescens

== Distribution and habitat ==
This species occurs between Eneabba and Serpentine in the Avon Wheatbelt, Geraldton Sandplains, Jarrah Forest and Swan Coastal Plain biogeographic regions of Western Australia. It grows in white, grey, yellow or lateritic sand or limestone on flats, wet sites, coastal areas and roadsides.

== Uses ==
Johnsonia pubescens responds well to cultivation. It can be propagated from seed and grows in full sun and most soils provided reasonable moisture is available.

== External sources ==
- Lindley, John (1840). A Sketch of the Vegetation of the Swan River Colony. London: James Ridgway, Piccadilly. p. lvii.
- Johnsonia pubescens Australasian Virtual Herbarium occurrence data
