= Johnsonia inconspicua =

Scientific classification
- Kingdom: Plantae
- Clade: Tracheophytes
- Clade: Angiosperms
- Clade: Monocots
- Order: Asparagales
- Family: Asphodelaceae
- Subfamily: Hemerocallidoideae
- Genus: Johnsonia
- Species: J. inconspicua

Binomial name
- Johnsonia inconspicua Keighery

Species of flowering plant

Johnsonia inconspicua is a plant in the family Asphodelaceae and is endemic to the south-west of Western Australia. It is a glabrous plant with grass-like leaves and white flowers, the sepals wider than the petals.

== Description ==
Johnsonia inconspicua is a glabrous plant with grass-like leaves 15–40 mm (0.59–1.57 in) long and 2–4 mm (0.079–0.157 in) wide. The flowering scape is 17–35 mm (0.67–1.38 in) wide, with floral bracts 6–12 mm (0.24–0.47 in) long and 4–9 mm (0.16–0.35 in) wide. The perianth is 4–6 mm (0.16–0.24 in) long and greenish-white or pale pink with a brown stripe in the middle. The perianth is 4–6 mm (0.16–0.24 in) wide and joined at the base, and the sepals are wider than the petals. The anthers and the style are about 3 mm (0.12 in) long. Flowering occurs from October to November and the fruit is a capsule 4–6 mm (0.16–0.24 in) long.

== Taxonomy and naming ==
Johnsonia inconspicua was first described in 1987 by Gregory John Keighery in the "Flora of Australia" from specimens collected 5 km (3.1 mi) south of Carbarup River in 1980. The specific epithet inconspicua means "inconspicuous".

== Distribution and habitat ==
This species occurs from near Bindoon to Cowaramup in the Jarrah Forest and Swan Coastal Plain bioregions of Western Australia, where it grows in low dunes and in winter-wet flats.
