= Rafaelia =

Scientific classification
- Domain: Eukaryota
- Kingdom: Animalia
- Phylum: Arthropoda
- Class: Insecta
- Order: Diptera
- Family: Sarcophagidae
- Tribe: Johnsoniini
- Genus: Rafaelia; Townsend, 1917

Genus of flies

Rafaelia is a genus of flesh flies (insects in the family Sarcophagidae). There are about nine described extant species in Rafaelia.

== Species ==
These nine species belong to the genus Rafaelia:

- R. acanthoptera (Wulp, 1895)^{c g}
- R. ampulla (Aldrich, 1916)^{c g}
- R. aurigena (Lopes, 1969)^{c g}
- R. natiuscula (Lopes, 1941)^{c g}
- R. pelenguensis Lopes, 1988^{c g}
- R. rufiventris Townsend, 1917^{i c g b}
- R. sissyra Dodge, 1967^{i c g}
- R. texana (Aldrich, 1916)^{c g}
- R. vernilis (Reinhard, 1947)^{c g}

Data sources: i = ITIS, c = Catalogue of Life, g = GBIF, b = Bugguide.net
