= List of Lepidodexia species =

This is a list of 177 species in Lepidodexia, a genus of flesh flies in the family Sarcophagidae.

== Lepidodexia species ==
- L. affinis de Souza Lopez, 1983^{c g}
- L. albida (Lopes, 1951)^{c g}
- L. albihirta (Dodge, 1965)^{c g}
- L. amazonica (Townsend, 1934)^{c g}
- L. andina (Townsend, 1912)^{c g}
- L. angusta (Aldrich, 1925)^{c g}
- L. angustifrons Lopes, 1993^{c g}
- L. angustiventris (Curran & Walley, 1934)^{c g}
- L. antennata (Dodge, 1966)^{c g}
- L. apolinari Lopes, 1951^{c g}
- L. aragua (Dodge, 1966)^{c g}
- L. asiliformis (Townsend, 1927)^{c g}
- L. atrata (Dodge, 1965)^{c g}
- L. aurea (Townsend, 1934)^{c g}
- L. azurea (Enderlein, 1928)^{c g}
- L. bicolor (Dodge, 1967)^{c}
- L. bisetosa (Dodge, 1968)^{c g}
- L. bivittata Curran, 1928^{c g}
- L. blakeae Dodge, 1955^{c g}
- L. bocainensis Lopes, 1980^{c g}
- L. bogotana (Enderlein, 1928)^{c g}
- L. boraceana Lopes & Tibana, 1984^{c g}
- L. borealis Reinhard, 1937^{c g}
- L. brevigaster (Lopes, 1945)^{c}
- L. brevirostris (Lopes, 1946)^{c g}
- L. bufonivora (Lopes & Vogelsang, 1953)^{c g}
- L. calliphorina (Enderlein, 1928)^{c g}
- L. camorim (Lopes, 1991)^{c g}
- L. camorin Lopes, 1991^{c g}
- L. camura (Hall, 1938)^{c g}
- L. carchiana Lopes, 1992^{c g}
- L. carthaginiensis Lopes & Tibana, 1988^{c g}
- L. carvalhoi Lopes, 1984^{c g}
- L. catamarca Lopes, 1991^{c g}
- L. chaetosa (Townsend, 1931)^{c g}
- L. chapadensis Tibana & Lopes, 1985^{c g}
- L. chocoensis Lopes, 1992^{c g}
- L. cingulata Lopes, 1961^{c g}
- L. cochliomyia (Townsend, 1919)^{c g}
- L. cognata (Walker, 1853)^{c}
- L. comata (Aldrich, 1925)^{c g}
- L. confusa (Lopes, 1946)^{c}
- L. costalis (Townsend, 1927)^{c g}
- L. costaricensis Lopes & Tibana, 1988^{c g}
- L. cubana (Lopes, 1951)^{c}
- L. cuenquensis Lopes, 1992^{c g}
- L. currani Lopes, 1951^{c g}
- L. cyaneiventris (Lopes, 1946)^{c}
- L. dimidiata (Wiedemann, 1830)^{c g}
- L. dissimilis (Dodge, 1965)^{c g}
- L. distincta (Lopes, 1947)^{c g}
- L. diversa (Lopes, 1946)^{c}
- L. diversinervis (Wulp, 1895)^{c g}
- L. diversipes (Coquillett, 1900)^{c g}
- L. dodgei Lopes, 1985^{c g}
- L. dominicensis (Lopes, 1975)^{c}
- L. downesi (Dodge, 1965)^{c g}
- L. downsi Lopes, 1991^{c g}
- L. ecuatoriana Lopes, 1984^{c g}
- L. egregia (Hall, 1933)^{c g}
- L. elaborata (Hall, 1933)^{c g}
- L. elegans Coquillett, 1895^{c g}
- L. facialis (Townsend, 1927)^{c g}
- L. fervens (Wiedemann, 1830)^{c g}
- L. fiebrigi (Enderlein, 1928)^{c g}
- L. flavipes de Souza Lopez, 1983^{c g}
- L. flavopilosa (Lopes, 1951)^{c g}
- L. frontalis Aldrich, 1929^{c g}
- L. fulviventris Lopes, 1980^{c g}
- L. fumipennis (Lopes, 1946)^{c g}
- L. fuscianalis (Wulp, 1895)^{c g}
- L. gaucha Lopes, 1991^{c g}
- L. gomesi Lopes, 1980^{c g}
- L. grisea Lopes, 1951^{c g}
- L. grisescens (Townsend, 1927)^{c g}
- L. guaillabamba Lopes, 1991^{c g}
- L. guatemalteca Lopes, 1985^{c g}
- L. guimaraesi Lopes, 1991^{c g}
- L. hinei (Aldrich, 1930)^{c g}
- L. hirculus (Coquillett, 1910)^{c g}
- L. huixtlaensis de Souza Lopez, 1983^{c g}
- L. hyalinipennis Lopes, 1992^{c g}
- L. ignota (Lopes, 1947)^{c g}
- L. inconismus (Reinhard, 1957)^{c g}
- L. korytkowiskii Lopes, 1992^{c g}
- L. latifrons Kano & Lopes, 1969^{g}
- L. lenti Lopes, 1980^{c g}
- L. lindneri (Townsend, 1931)^{c g}
- L. maculata Lopes, 1991^{c g}
- L. major Lopes, 1993^{c g}
- L. matogrossensis Lopes, 1991^{c g}
- L. mendax Lopes, 1992^{c g}
- L. mendesi Lopes, 1991^{c g}
- L. metallica (Townsend, 1928)^{c g}
- L. mexicana Lopes, 1985^{c g}
- L. miamensis (Townsend, 1918)^{c g}
- L. micropyga (Wulp, 1895)^{c g}
- L. minensis Lopes, 1980^{c g}
- L. minuta Lopes, 1991^{c g}
- L. modulata (Wulp, 1895)^{c g}
- L. monochaeta (Dodge, 1968)^{c g}
- L. myersi (Townsend, 1935)^{c g}
- L. napoensis de Souza Lopez, 1983^{c g}
- L. nigribimbo (Dodge, 1965)^{c g}
- L. nigropilosa Lopes, 1951^{c g}
- L. nocturnalis Walton, 1915^{c g}
- L. obscura (Lopes, 1950)^{c g}
- L. occulta Lopes, 1986^{c g}
- L. ochristriga (Enderlein, 1928)^{c g}
- L. ojedai Lopes, 1992^{c g}
- L. oliveirai (Lopes, 1974)^{c g}
- L. olmaba Brimley, 1927^{c g}
- L. opima (Wiedemann, 1830)^{c g}
- L. pacta (Townsend, 1934)^{c g}
- L. pallipes (Lopes & Tibana, 1988)^{c g}
- L. palpalis (Dodge, 1968)^{c g}
- L. panamensis (Dodge, 1968)^{c g}
- L. parva (Lopes, 1946)^{c}
- L. peculiaris Lopes, 1985^{c g}
- L. peruana Lopes, 1986^{c g}
- L. petersoni Lopes, 1984^{c g}
- L. pilosa (Lopes, 1969)^{c g}
- L. plumigera (Wulp, 1895)^{c g}
- L. pomaschi Lopes, 1991^{c g}
- L. proseni Lopes, 1991^{c g}
- L. quadrisetosa Lopes, 1984^{c g}
- L. reali Lopes & Tibana, 1988^{c g}
- L. reducens (Enderlein, 1928)^{c g}
- L. reinhardi Lopes, 1979^{c g}
- L. retusa (Hall, 1933)^{c g}
- L. robacki (Lopes, 1975)^{c g}
- L. rubriventris (Macquart, 1851)^{c g}
- L. rufianalis (Lopes, 1975)^{c g}
- L. rufipes (Dodge, 1965)^{c g}
- L. rufitibia (Wulp, 1895)^{c g}
- L. rufocaudatata (Bigot, 1889)^{c g}
- L. rustica (Lopes, 1950)^{c g}
- L. sapucaiensis Lopes, 1993^{c g}
- L. sarcophagina (Townsend, 1927)^{c g}
- L. setifacies Lopes, 1984^{c g}
- L. setifrons de Souza Lopez, 1983^{c g}
- L. setosa (Coquillett, 1895)^{c g}
- L. sheldoni (Coquillett, 1898)^{c g}
- L. shewelli Lopes, 1984^{c g}
- L. similis Lopes, 1984^{c g}
- L. sinopi Lopes & Tibana, 1982^{c g}
- L. souzalopesi Lehrer, 1995^{c g}
- L. squamata (Walker, 1853)^{c g}
- L. strigosa (Reinhard, 1945)^{c g}
- L. subcylindrica (Townsend, 1935)^{c g}
- L. subpolita (Aldrich, 1916)^{c g}
- L. takaruni Lopes, 1991^{c g}
- L. tandapiens Lopes, 1988^{c g}
- L. teffeensis (Townsend, 1927)^{c g}
- L. tessellata (Aldrich, 1916)^{c g}
- L. tetraptera Brauer & von Bergenstamm, 1891^{c g}
- L. teutonia Lopes, 1991^{c g}
- L. townsendi (Aldrich, 1925)^{c g}
- L. trinidadensis Lopes, 1985^{c g}
- L. tucumana (Blanchard, 1942)^{c g}
- L. tungurahuensis Lopes & Tibana, 1988^{c g}
- L. tungurauensis Lopes & Tibana, 1988^{c g}
- L. turrialba Lopes, 1991^{c g}
- L. unicolor Aldrich, 1916^{c g}
- L. uniseta (Lopes, 1950)^{c g}
- L. uruhuasi (Townsend, 1917)^{c g}
- L. veniseta (Dodge, 1968)^{c g}
- L. vexator (Dodge, 1968)^{c g}
- L. villipes (Dodge, 1965)^{c g}
- L. virgata (Wiedemann, 1830)^{c g}
- L. vittata (Lopes, 1968)^{c}
- L. weyrauchi Lopes, 1991^{c g}
- L. woodi Lopes, 1985^{c g}
- L. woodorum Pape, 1989^{c g}
- L. wygodzinskyi Lopes, 1982^{c g}
- L. zeledoni Lopes, 1985^{c g}
- L. zygox (Hall, 1938)^{c g}

This is a list of 177 species in Lepidodexia, a genus of flesh flies in the family Sarcophagidae. Data sources: i = ITIS, c = Catalogue of Life, g = GBIF, b = Bugguide.net
