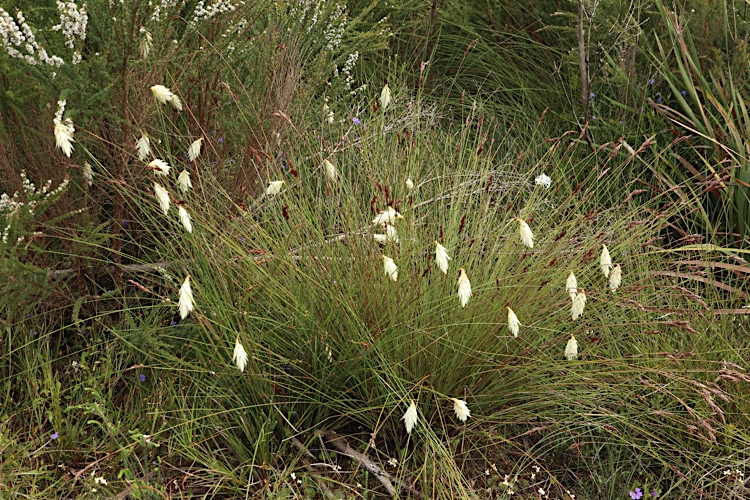
- In Walpole-Nornalup National Park

Scientific classification
- Kingdom: Plantae
- Clade: Tracheophytes
- Clade: Angiosperms
- Clade: Monocots
- Order: Asparagales
- Family: Asphodelaceae
- Subfamily: Hemerocallidoideae
- Genus: Johnsonia
- Species: J. lupulina

Binomial name
- Johnsonia lupulina R.Br.

= Johnsonia lupulina =

Species of flowering plant

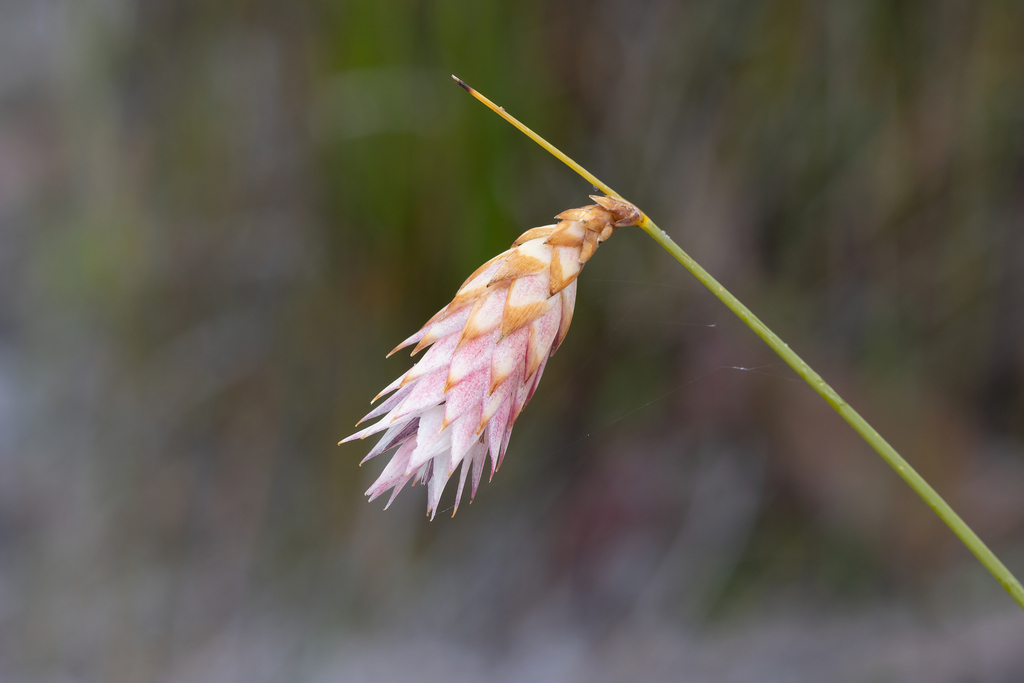
Flower

Johnsonia lupulina, common known as hooded lily, is a plant in the family Asphodelaceae and is endemic to the south-west of Western Australia. It is a rhizomatous, tufted, clump-forming perennial with creamy-white flowers.

== Description ==
Johnsonia lupulina is a rhizomatous, tufted, clump-forming, grass-like or perennial herb with leaves 48–75 mm (1.9–3.0 in) long and 1.7–2.3 mm (0.067–0.091 in) wide. The flowering scape is 42–72 mm (1.7–2.8 in) long with broadly lance-shaped floral bracts 17–24 mm (0.67–0.94 in) long and 5–6 mm (0.20–0.24 in) wide. The perianth is 7–8 mm (0.28–0.31 in) long and creamy-white, and the sepals are wider than the petals. The anthers are 4–5 mm (0.16–0.20 in) long and the style is 5–6 mm (0.20–0.24 in) long. Flowering occurs from September to November and the fruit is a capsule 7–8 mm (0.28–0.31 in) long.

== Taxonomy and naming ==
Johnsonia lupulina was first described in 1810 by Robert Brown (botanist, born 1773) in Prodromus Florae Novae Hollandiae from specimens collected near King Georges Sound in 1801. The specific epithet lupulina means "Humulus lupulus-like" or "hop-like".

== Distribution and habitat ==
This species occurs between Albany and Collie in the Esperance Plains, Jarrah Forest, Swan Coastal Plain and Warren biogeographic regions of south-western Western Australia, where it grows on dunes, roadsides and damp situations in woodland.
