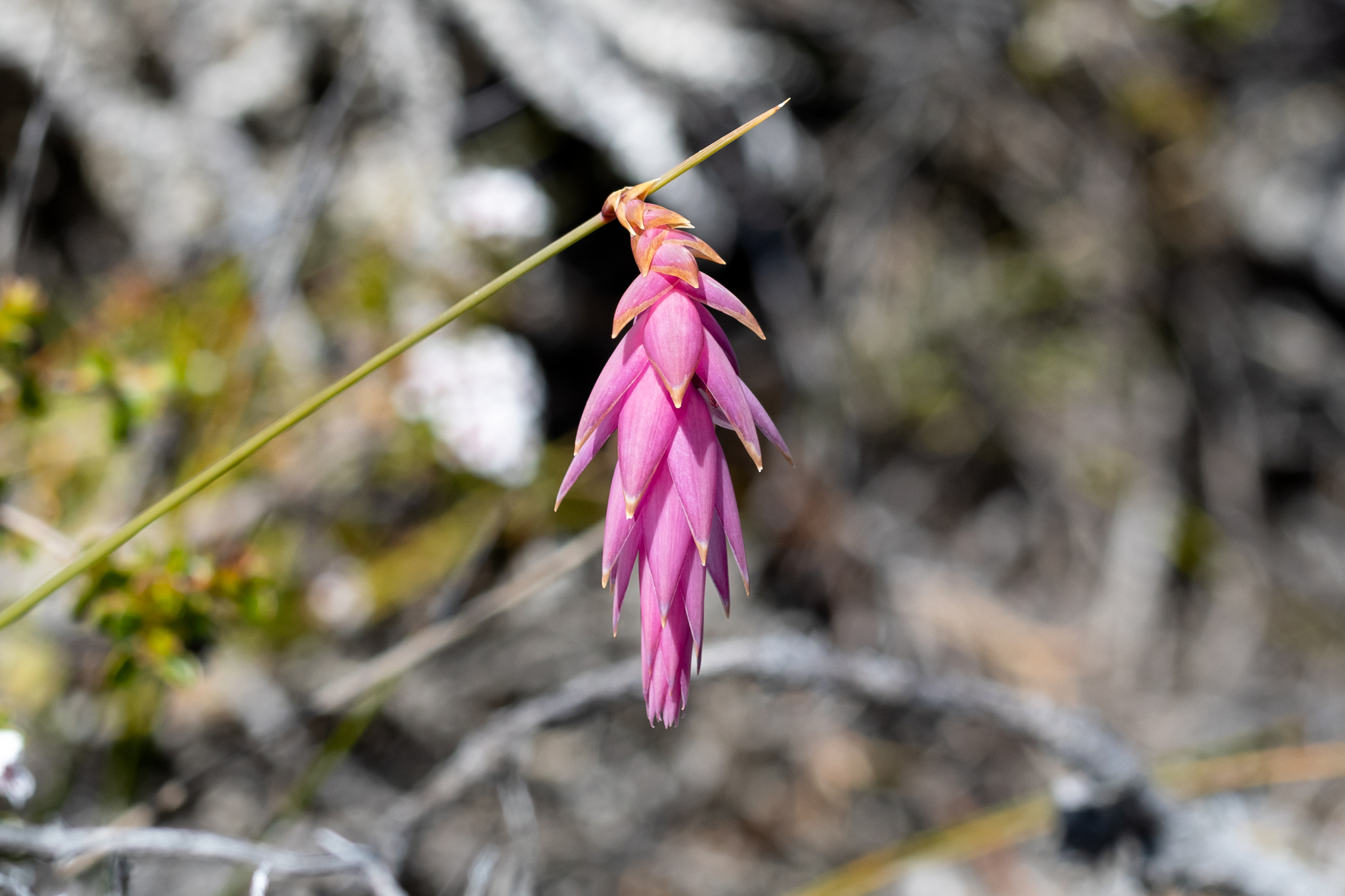
- Near Cheyne Beach Whaling Station

Scientific classification
- Kingdom: Plantae
- Clade: Tracheophytes
- Clade: Angiosperms
- Clade: Monocots
- Order: Asparagales
- Family: Asphodelaceae
- Subfamily: Hemerocallidoideae
- Genus: Johnsonia
- Species: J. teretifolia

Binomial name
- Johnsonia teretifolia Endl.

= Johnsonia teretifolia =

Species of flowering plant

Johnsonia teretifolia, common known as hooded lily, is a plant in the family Asphodelaceae and is endemic to the south-west of Western Australia. It is a rhizomatous, tufted, or grass-like perennial with white, pink or green flowers.

== Description ==
Johnsonia teretifolia is a rhizomatous, tufted, perennial herb with grass-like leaves 20–40 mm (0.79–1.57 in) long and 1.2–2.0 mm (0.047–0.079 in) wide. The flowering scape is pink, with floral bracts 15–17 mm (0.59–0.67 in) long and 4–5 mm (0.16–0.20 in) wide. The perianth is 6–8 mm (0.24–0.31 in) long and purple, and the sepals and wider than the petals. The anthers are about 3 mm (0.12 in) long, and the style is about 5 mm (0.20 in) long. Flowering occurs from October to December and the fruit is a capsule 5–7 mm (0.20–0.28 in) long.

== Taxonomy and naming ==
Johnsonia teretifolia was first described in 1846 by Stephan Endlicher in Lehmann's "Plantae Preissianae". The specific epithet teretifolia means "terete-leaved".

== Distribution and habitat ==
This species occurs between Albany and the Stirling Range in the Esperance Plains, Jarrah Forest and Warren biogeographic regions of Western Australia where it grows in scree slopes and swamps.
