= Rafaelia rufiventris =

Scientific classification
- Domain: Eukaryota
- Kingdom: Animalia
- Phylum: Arthropoda
- Class: Insecta
- Order: Diptera
- Family: Sarcophagidae
- Genus: Rafaelia
- Species: R. rufiventris

Binomial name
- Rafaelia rufiventris Townsend, 1917

Species of fly

Rafaelia rufiventris is a species of flesh flies (insects in the family Sarcophagidae). It was first described by Charles Townsend in 1917.
