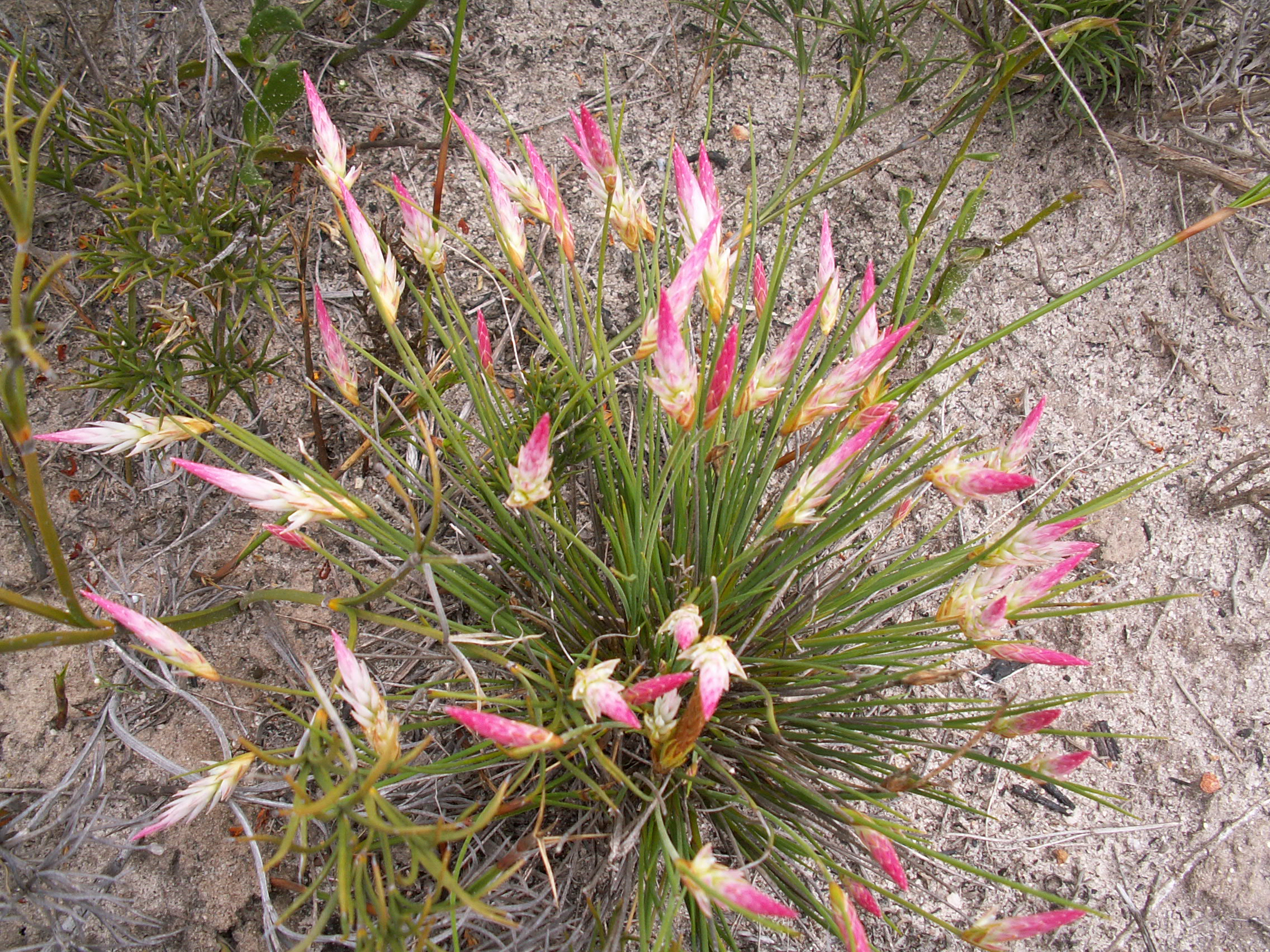
- Johnsonia pubescens in Lesueur National Park

Scientific classification
- Kingdom: Plantae
- Clade: Tracheophytes
- Clade: Angiosperms
- Clade: Monocots
- Order: Asparagales
- Family: Asphodelaceae
- Subfamily: Hemerocallidoideae
- Genus: Johnsonia; R.Br.

Type species
- Johnsonia lupulina

= Johnsonia (plant) =

Genus of flowering plants

Johnsonia is a genus composed of five species of herbs in the family Asphodelaceae, all of which are endemic to the south-west of Western Australia. They are grass-like plants with minute flowers surrounded by bracts which are often tinged with white, pink or cream.

== Description ==
All the plants in this genus are rhizomatous, tufted, perennial herbs with grass-like leaves which all emerge from the base of the plant. The bases of the leaves surround the stem. The flower spike is leafless, more or less the same length as the leaves, with large, dry overlapping bracts surrounding minute flowers. All species flower between August and December.

== Taxonomy and naming ==
The genus was first formally described in 1810 by Robert Brown in Prodromus Florae Novae Hollandiae et Insulae Van Diemen. The type species is Johnsonia lupulina. The name Johnsonia is in recognition of the 17th century English naturalist, Thomas Johnson.

The following is a list of species of Johnsonia recognised by the World Checklist of Selected Plant Families as at January 2019:

=== Species list ===
- Johnsonia acaulis Endl. in J.G.C.Lehmann
- Johnsonia inconspicua Keighery
- Johnsonia lupulina R.Br.
- Johnsonia pubescens Lindl.
- Johnsonia teretifolia Endl. in J.G.C.Lehmann

== Distribution and habitat ==
Johnsonia species all occur in the south-west of Western Australia in the Avon Wheatbelt, Esperance Plains, Jarrah Forest, Mallee, Swan Coastal Plain and Warren biogeographic zones. Each species has its own habitat requirements.
