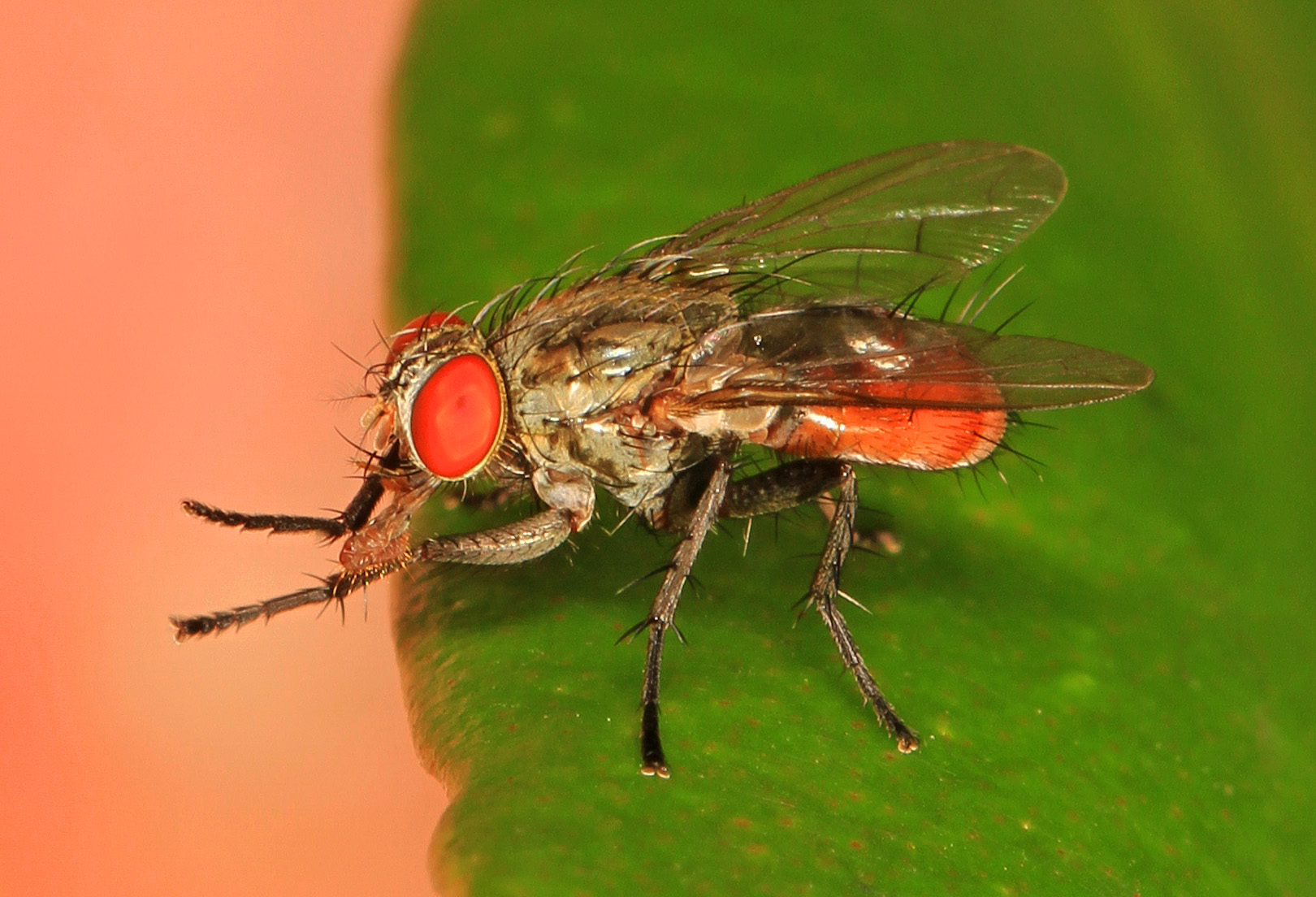

Scientific classification
- Domain: Eukaryota
- Kingdom: Animalia
- Phylum: Arthropoda
- Class: Insecta
- Order: Diptera
- Family: Sarcophagidae
- Tribe: Johnsoniini
- Genus: Lepidodexia; Brauer & von Bergenstamm, 1891

= Lepidodexia =

Genus of flies

Lepidodexia is a genus of flesh flies in the family Sarcophagidae. There are at least 170 described species in Lepidodexia.

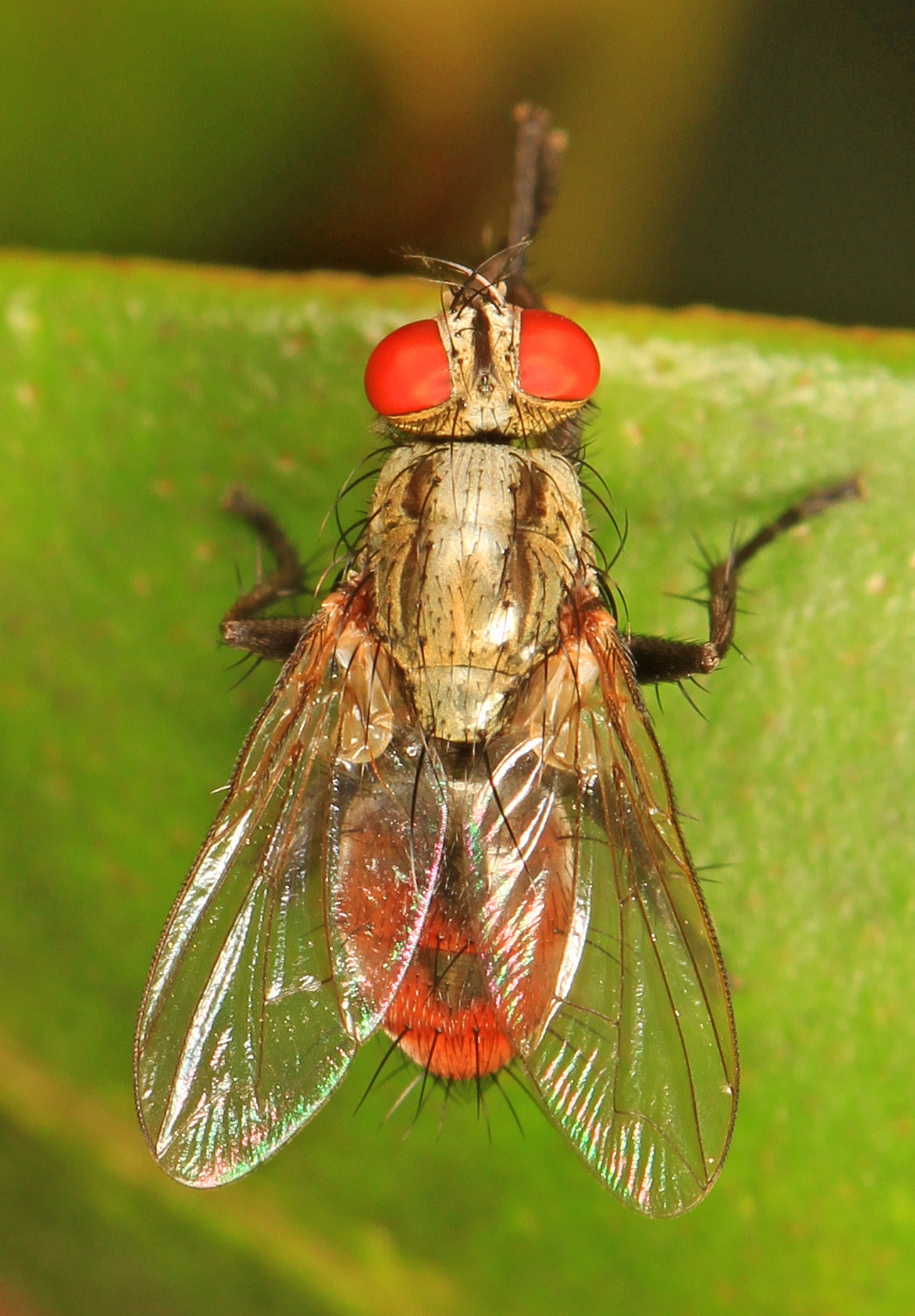

== See also ==
- List of Lepidodexia species
