= Johnsonia (fly) =

Scientific classification
- Kingdom: Animalia
- Phylum: Arthropoda
- Class: Insecta
- Order: Diptera
- Family: Sarcophagidae
- Genus: Lepidodexia
- Subgenus: Johnsonia; Coquillett, 1895

Genus of flies

Johnsonia is a subgenus of flies belonging to the family Sarcophagidae.

The species of this genus are found in Central America.

== Species ==
- Lepidodexia bivittata Curran, 1928
- Lepidodexia borealis Reinhard, 1937
