= Rabbit health =

Health of rabbits

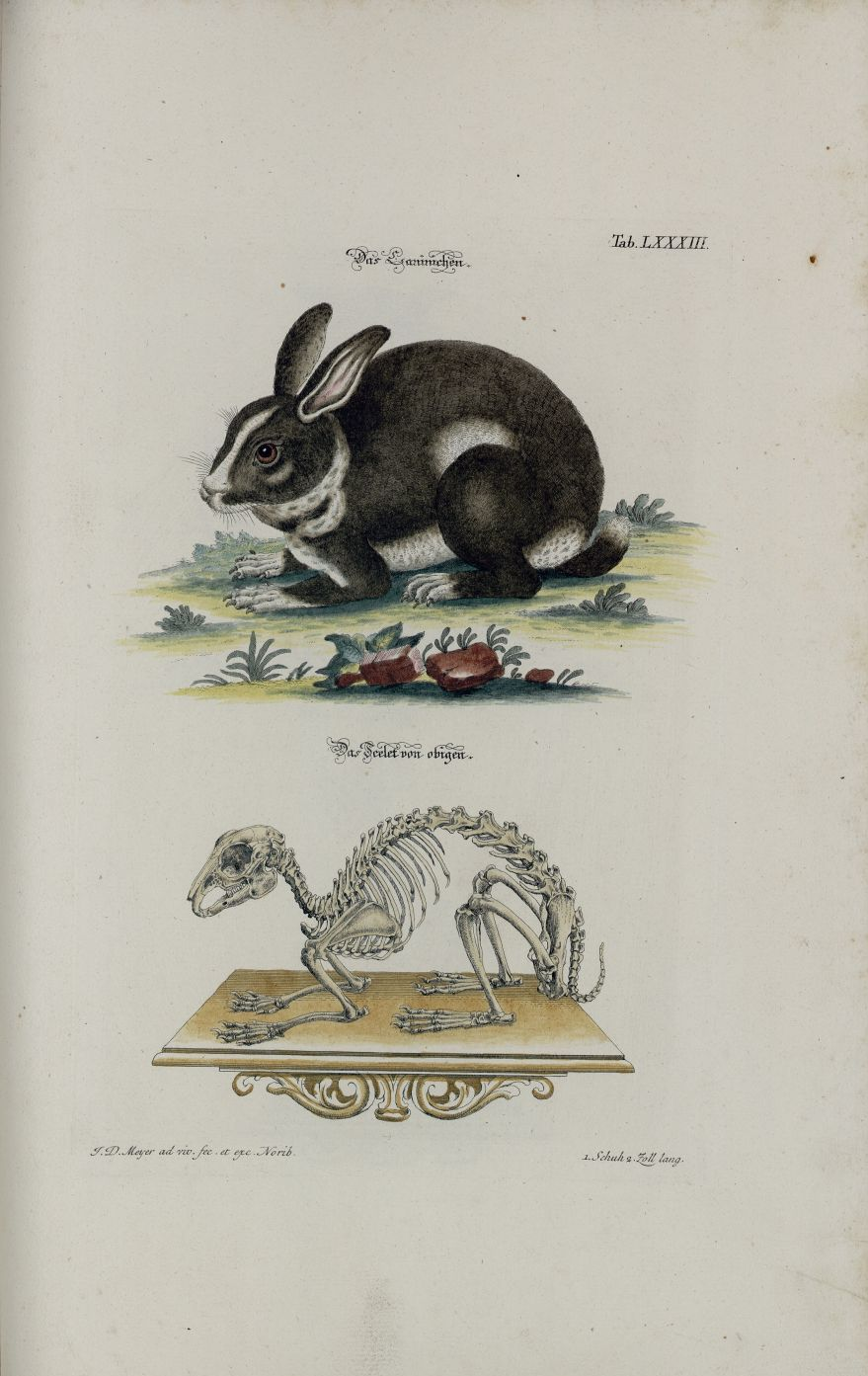
Engraving of a wild rabbit and its skeleton by Johann Daniel Meyer (1752)

The health of rabbits is well studied in veterinary medicine, owing to the importance of rabbits as laboratory animals and centuries of domestication for fur and meat. To stay healthy, most rabbits maintain a well-balanced diet of hay and vegetables. Much of the research on rabbit health and recommendations applies only to the European rabbit, the only domesticated species of rabbit.

Disease in pet rabbits is rare when they are raised in sanitary conditions and provided with adequate care, but the wider population of wild and feral rabbits is susceptible to various diseases and disorders, which has been taken advantage of in research and population control. Rabbits have fragile bones, especially in their spines, and need support on the bottom when they are picked up.

== Spaying and neutering ==
Neutering is possible for both female and male rabbits; however, spaying females can pose significant risks. This is because spaying female rabbits requires a far bigger surgery with a higher mortality rate (during or in relation to the procedure) compared to males, as their lower abdomen needs to be opened up in order to remove ovaries and uterus. Negative health outcomes that have been reported include colonic obstruction, urinary incontinence, ureteral stenosis, increased ageing of ligaments, and alterations of the rabbit's cornea. In general, due to the wide range and severity of possible negative health effects and the high risk for complications from anesthesia and the surgery itself, spaying female rabbits should only be considered in case of acute medical reasons (e.g., ovarian or uterine cancer), if they show signs of hormonal problems, like overly frequent phases of heat or pseudopregnancies, or unusually aggressive behavior, which cannot be attributed to environmental factors, e.g., a lack of exercise. If the female rabbit gets left untreated of having uterine cancer and the tumor spreads it can lead to their death. It is said that female rabbits are more than likely to develop uterine cancer sometime in their lifetime. Assertions of female rabbits near inevitably developing cancer if left unneutered, as well as neutered females living longer, have no scientific foundation.

However, castration of male pet rabbits is necessary, if they are to be kept species-appropriate (together with at least one other rabbit), which would not otherwise be possible. Uncastrated male rabbits will engage in severe and often bloody fights with each other upon reaching adulthood, which can even end fatally. To prevent uncontrolled reproduction, it is advised to castrate males instead of females, as the necessary procedure, which requires only a small incision, has proven to be relatively safe and to have far less adverse effects on the rabbit's overall health.

== Vaccinations ==
In most jurisdictions, including the United States (except where required by local animal control ordinances), rabbits do not require vaccination. Vaccinations exist for both rabbit hemorrhagic disease and myxomatosis. These vaccinations are usually given annually, two weeks apart. If there is an outbreak of myxomatosis locally, this vaccine can be administered every six months for extra protection. Myxomatosis immunizations are not available in all countries, including Australia, due to fears that immunity will pass on to feral rabbits. However, they are recommended by some veterinarians as prophylactics, where they are legally available.

== Declawing ==
A rabbit cannot be declawed. Lacking pads on the bottoms of its feet, a rabbit requires its claws for traction. Removing its claws would render it unable to stand.

== Tonic immobility ==
Coping with stress is a key aspect of rabbit behavior, and this can be traced to part of the brain known as ventral tegmental area (VTA). Dopaminergic neurons in this part of the brain release the hormone dopamine. In rabbits, it is released as part of a coping mechanism while in a heightened state of fear or stress, and has a calming effect. Dopamine has also been found in the rabbit's medial prefrontal cortex, the nucleus accumbens, and the amygdala.

Tonic immobility (TI) is sometimes called "trancing" or "playing dead". Physiological and behavioral responses to human-induced TI have been found to indicate a fear-motivated stress state in rabbits. Accordingly, even though people think the rabbits enjoy it, the promotion of TI to try to increase a bond between rabbits and their owners is misplaced. However, some researchers conclude that inducing TI in rabbits is appropriate for certain medical procedures, as it holds less risk than anesthesia.

== Sore hocks ==
The formation of open sores on the rabbit's hocks, commonly called sore hocks, is a problem that commonly afflicts mostly heavy-weight rabbits kept in cages with wire flooring or soiled solid flooring. The problem is most prevalent in rex-furred rabbits and heavy-weight rabbits (over 4 kg (9 lb)), as well as those with thin foot bristles.

The condition results when, over the course of time, the protective bristle-like fur on the rabbit's hocks thins down. Standing urine or other unsanitary cage conditions can exacerbate the problem by irritating the sensitive skin. The exposed skin in turn can result in tender areas or, in severe cases, open sores, which may then become infected and abscessed if not properly cared for.

== Ear infections ==
Rabbits are prone to external and middle ear infections that are often curable only with surgery, though treatment is effective on the short term. Lop-eared rabbits have been bred by humans for their cute appearance, but have medical issues that make them analogous to short faced dogs like pugs (with breathing problems). Specifically, lop ears close the ear canal, creating a site for infection, often leading in middle life to ear disease in the form of a middle ear infection (otitis media).

Both lop-eared and half-lop-eared rabbits are at greater risk of ear infection, as are older rabbits in general, compared to erect-eared rabbits. Rabbit owners who report ear infections also describe decreased responsiveness and quality of life in affected rabbits.

== Gastrointestinal stasis ==
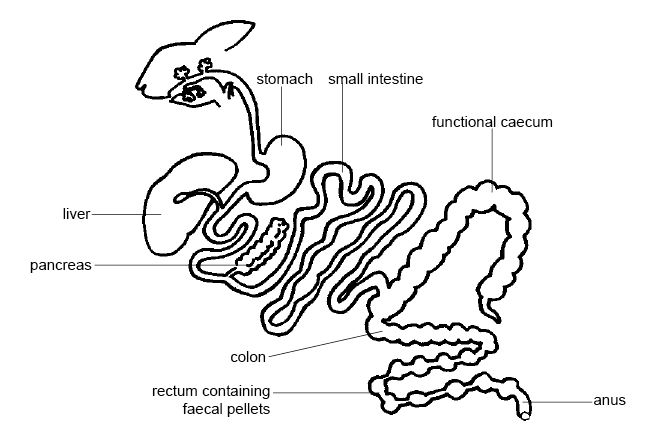
Digestive system of the rabbit, by Ruth Lawson, Otago Polytechnic 26 November 2007

Gastrointestinal stasis (GI stasis) is a serious and potentially fatal condition that occurs in some rabbits in which gut motility is severely reduced and possibly completely stopped. When untreated or improperly treated, GI stasis can be fatal in as little as 24 hours.

GI stasis is the condition of food not moving through the gut as quickly as normal. The gut contents may dehydrate and compact into a hard, immobile mass (impacted gut), blocking the digestive tract of the rabbit. Food in an immobile gut may also ferment, causing significant gas buildup and resultant gas pain for the rabbit. GI stasis may be caused by feeding a rabbit too many carbohydrates.

The first noticeable symptom of GI stasis may be that the rabbit suddenly stops eating. Treatment frequently includes intravenous or subcutaneous fluid therapy (rehydration through injection of a balanced electrolyte solution), pain control, possible careful massage to promote gas expulsion and comfort, drugs to promote gut motility, and careful monitoring of all inputs and outputs. The rabbit's diet may also be changed as part of treatment, to include force-feeding to ensure adequate nutrition. Surgery to remove the blockage is not generally recommended and comes with a poor prognosis.

Some rabbits are more prone to GI stasis than others. The causes of GI stasis are not completely understood, but common contributing factors are thought to include stress, reduced food intake, low fiber in the diet, dehydration, reduction in exercise or blockage caused by excess fur or carpet ingestion. Stress factors can include changes in housing, transportation, or medical procedures under anesthesia. As many of these factors may occur together (poor dental structure leading to decreased food intake, followed by a stressful veterinary dental procedure to correct the dental problem), establishing a root cause may be difficult.

GI stasis is sometimes misdiagnosed as "hair balls" by veterinarians or rabbit keepers not familiar with the condition. While fur is commonly found in the stomach following a fatal case of GI stasis, it is also found in healthy rabbits. Molting and chewing fur can be a predisposing factor in the occurrence of GI stasis; however, the primary cause is the change in motility of the gut.

== Dental problems ==
Dental disease has several causes, namely genetics, inappropriate diet, injury to the jaw, infection, or cancer.

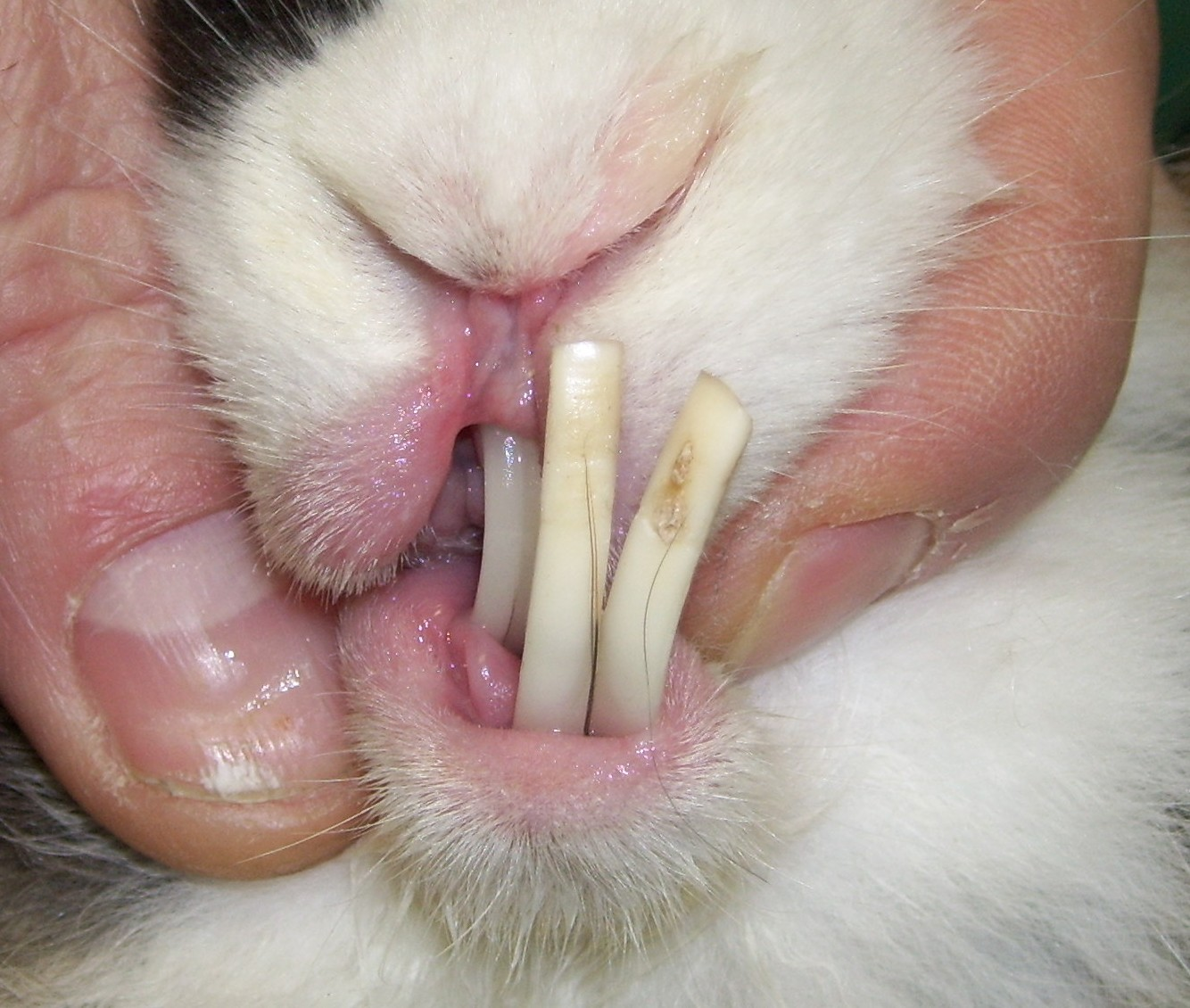
Malocclusion in a rabbit

- Malocclusion: Rabbit teeth are open-rooted and continue to grow throughout their lives, which is why they need constant abrasion. Since tooth enamel is the hardest substance in the body and much harder than anything a rabbit could chew, wearing down the teeth can only happen through chewing movements, i.e., by the teeth wearing down each other. If the teeth are not properly aligned, a condition called malocclusion, the necessary abrasion cannot happen naturally and needs to be done manually by an experienced veterinarian. Malocclusion can be either inborn or have a secondary cause. Inborn malocclusion usually presents as brachygnathism or prognathism and will generally show within the first few months of a rabbit's life. Any dental problems that start appearing in adult rabbits, however, cannot be inborn. The most common secondary causes of malocclusion are trauma (e.g., falls on the nose, nibbling on cage grids, clipping the teeth with unsuited tools), bacterial infection, and low-fiber diet.
- Molar spurs: These are caused by improper abrasion of the molars and can dig into the rabbit's tongue and/or cheek causing severe pain. They can develop into a secondary malocclusion and need to be filed down by an experienced veterinarian. If left untreated, molar spurs can be fatal. The underlying cause of molar spurs in rabbits without (inborn) malocclusion is usually a wrong diet. Since, as mentioned above, teeth cannot wear down on food, rabbits need high-fiber and other chewing intensive food, particularly hay, grass, potherbs, and herbs, to keep their teeth in shape. Some industrially produced ready-made rabbit foods, especially pellets and muesli, are very low-fiber and therefore are known to be one of the main causes of molar spurs and secondary malocclusion if fed over an extended period of time.
- Osteoporosis: Rabbits, especially neutered females and those that are kept indoors without adequate natural sunlight, can suffer from osteoporosis, in which holes appear in the skull by X-Ray imaging. This reflects the general thinning of the bone, and teeth will start to become looser in the sockets, making it uncomfortable and painful for the animal to chew hay. The inability to properly chew hay can result in molar spurs, as described above, and weight loss, leading into a downward spiral if not treated promptly. This can be reversible and treatable. A veterinary formulated liquid calcium supplement with vitamin D3 and magnesium can be given mixed with the rabbit's drinking water, once or twice per week, according to the veterinarian's instructions. The molar spurs should also be trimmed down by an experienced exotic veterinarian specialised in rabbit care, once every 1–2 months, depending on the case.

Signs of dental difficulty include difficulty eating, weight loss and small stools and visibly overgrown teeth. However, there are many other causes of ptyalism, including pain due to other causes.

Rabbits will gnaw on almost anything, including electrical cords (possibly leading to electrocution), potentially poisonous plants, and material like carpet and fabric that may cause life-threatening intestinal blockages, so areas to which they have access need to be pet-proofed.

== Respiratory and conjunctival problems ==
An over-diagnosed ailment amongst rabbits is respiratory infection, known as rhinitis or colloquially as "snuffles". Pasteurella, a bacterium, was historically misdiagnosed as the main cause of respiratory disease in rabbits, as the bacterium is present in the respiratory tract of most adult rabbits. The bacterium may, under poor conditions, reproduce rapidly and produce symptoms of pasteurellosis, though this is known to be a factor in the overuse of antibiotics among rabbits and is not always the cause of respiratory disease. A runny nose, for instance, can have several causes, among those being high temperature or humidity, extreme stress, environmental pollution (like perfume or incense), a sinus infection or dental disorders. Options for treating this is removing the pollutant, lowering or raising the temperature accordingly, and medical treatment for sinus infections.

Sneezing can be a sign of environmental pollution, such as too much dust or high ammonia levels.

Runny eyes and other conjunctival problems can be caused by dental disease or a blockage of the tear duct. Environmental pollution, corneal disease, entropion, distichiasis, or inflammation of the eyes are also causes. Some conjunctival problems are effectively treated with topical or systemic gentamicin.

== Viral diseases ==
Rabbits are subject to infection by a variety of viruses. Some have had deadly and widespread impact.

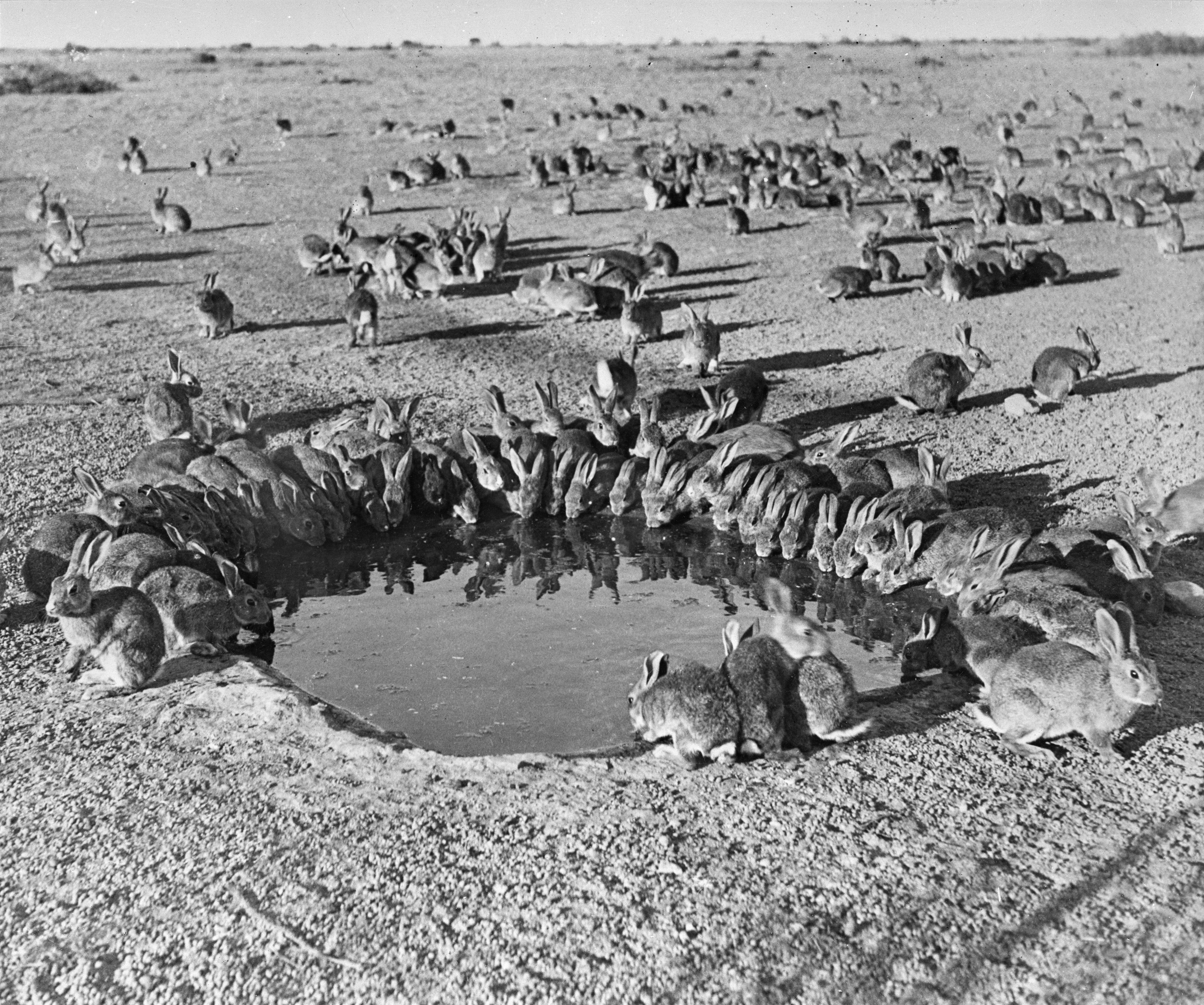
Myxomatosis Trial, Wardang Island (Australia) 1938

=== Myxomatosis ===
Myxomatosis is a virulent threat to all rabbits but not to humans. The intentional introduction of myxomatosis in rabbit-ravaged Australia killed an estimated 500 million feral rabbits between 1950 and 1952. The Australian government will not allow veterinarians to purchase and use the myxomatosis vaccine that would protect domestic rabbits, for fear that this immunity would be spread into the wild via escaped livestock and pets. This potential consequence is also one motivation for the pet-rabbit ban in Queensland.

In Australia, rabbits caged outdoors in areas with high numbers of mosquitoes are vulnerable to myxomatosis. In Europe, fleas are the carriers of myxomatosis. In some countries, annual vaccinations against myxomatosis are available.

=== Rabbit hemorrhagic disease (RHD) ===
Rabbit hemorrhagic disease (RHD), also known as viral hemorrhagic disease (VHD) or rabbit calicivirus disease (RCD), is caused by a rabbit-specific calicivirus known as rabbit hemorrhagic disease virus (RHDV) or rabbit calicivirus (RCV). Discovered in 1983, RHD is highly infectious and usually fatal. Initial signs of the disease may be limited to fever and lethargy, until significant internal organ damage results in labored breathing, squealing, bloody mucus, and eventual coma and death. Internally, the infection causes necrosis of the liver and damages other organs, especially the spleen, kidneys, and small intestine.

RHD, like myxomatosis, has been intentionally introduced to control feral rabbit populations in Australia and (illegally) in New Zealand, and RHD has, in some areas, escaped quarantine. The disease has killed tens of millions of rabbits in China (unintentionally) as well as Australia, with other epidemics reported in Bolivia, Mexico, South Korea, and continental Europe. Rabbit populations in New Zealand have bounced back after developing a genetic immunity to RHD, and the disease has, so far, had no effect on the genetically divergent native wild rabbits and hares in the Americas.

In the United States, an October 2013 USDA document stated:

RHD has been found in the United States as recently as 2010, and was detected in Canada in 2011. Thus far, outbreaks have been controlled quickly through quarantine, depopulation, disease tracing, and cleaning and disinfection; however, rabbit losses have been in the thousands. An RHD vaccine exists, but it is not recommended for use where the disease is not widespread in wildlife, as it may hide signs of disease and is not considered a practical response for such a rapidly spreading disease.

In the UK, reports of RHD (as recently as February 2018) have been submitted to the British Rabbit Council's online "Notice Board". Vaccines for RHD are available—and mandatory—in the UK.

A new strain of the virus has been discovered, called rabbit hemorrhagic disease virus 2 (RHDV2).

=== West Nile virus ===
West Nile virus is another threat to domestic as well as wild rabbits. It is a fatal disease, and while vaccines are available for other species, there are none yet specifically indicated for rabbits.

== Wry neck and parasitic fungus ==
Wry neck (or head tilt or torticollis) is a condition in rabbits that can be fatal, due to the resulting disorientation that causes the animal to stop eating, drinking or performing other tasks, or through other afflictions causing the condition, such as pasteurellosis.

The causes of wry neck can be middle- or inner-ear infections, ear mites (Psoroptes cuniculi), nematodes (roundworms, Baylisascaris procyonis), cancer (in brain, neck, ear), cervical muscle contractions, ingestion of lead or toxic plants, or diseases or injuries affecting the brain (stroke, abscess, tumor, trauma).

However, the most common cause is a parasitic microscopic fungus called Encephalitozoon cuniculi (E. cuniculi). Note that: "despite approximately half of all pet rabbits carrying the infection, only a small proportion of these cases ever show any illness". Symptoms may include drinking more water than usual, frequent peeing, seizures and even complete paralysis. Stressful situations may worsen the symptoms. There is a precedent for antibiotic treatment against E. cuniculi in rabbits exhibiting symptoms of torticollis. The usual drugs for treatment and prevention are the benzimidazole anthelmintics, particularly fenbendazole (also used as a deworming agent in other animal species). In the UK, fenbendazole (under the brand name Panacur Rabbit) is sold over-the-counter in oral paste form as a nine-day treatment. Fenbendazole is particularly recommended for rabbits kept in colonies and as a preventive before mixing new rabbits with each other, and there have been anecdotal reports of successful treatments with ponazuril.

== Mites ==
Ear Canker is caused by nonburrowing ear mites Psoroptes cuniculi. It causes severe scabbing and inflammation on the ears and is very painful. Infected rabbits scratch a lot, which causes secondary bacterial infections. Rabbits should be treated as soon as possible, as the mites & infections can cause severe complications. It can also cause Wry neck (as described above).

Fur mites can be any of a variety of species including Leporacarus gibbus, but most commonly Cheyletiella parasitivorax. C. parasitivorax do not burrow into the skin but rather live in the keratin layer. They can cause dandruff, itching and fur loss. Diagnosis is not easy & it might take several tries to determine if mites are present.

Sarcoptic mange (also known as scabies) is usually caused by the burrowing mite Sarcoptes scabiei (also known as S. scabei). Symptoms are beige crusts around the borders of the ears, edges of the eyelids, the nose, mouth and toes. Also loss of fur. Scratching can lead to secondary bacterial infection. If untreated, the crusts can cover extensive areas of the body. Even mild cases should be treated as soon a possible.

Tropical rat mites (Ornithonyssus bacoti) (and pigeon mites) cause severe itching. While rabbits can be easily treated (described below), to prevent reinfection, the host species (e.g., rat, pigeon) must also be treated or removed.

Burrowing mange mites (Trixacarus caviae) are rare in rabbits but can cause such painful itching that the rabbit can become aggressive.

All mites that infect rabbits can be treated by drugs given orally, by injection or applied on the skin (most common treatment), at intervals, as dictated by a veterinarian. The environment must also be treated.

== Fly strike ==
Fly strike, or blowfly (Lucilia sericata) strike, is a condition that occurs when flies lay their eggs in a rabbit's damp or soiled fur, or in an open wound. Within 12 hours, the eggs hatch into the larval stage of the fly, known as maggots. Initially small but quickly growing to 15 mm (0.59 in) long, maggots can burrow into skin and feed on an animal's tissue, leading to shock and death. The most susceptible rabbits are those in unsanitary conditions, sedentary ones, and those unable to clean their excretory areas. Rabbits with diarrhea should be inspected often for fly strike, especially during the summer months. The topical treatment Rearguard (from Novartis) is approved in the United Kingdom for 10-week-per-application prevention of fly strike.

=== Bot flies ===
Bot flies that infect rabbits (generally Cuterebra buccata) lay their eggs where rabbits live. The eggs hatch into larvae which enter the rabbit through the nose, mouth or open wound. The larvae migrate within the rabbit to just under the skin, where it forms a visible bump with breathing hole. It feeds off of the rabbit's flesh and bodily fluids for up to 30 days, reaching up to 3 cm (1.2 in) long. It then exits through the hole, pupates in the ground & emerges as an adult. These bot flies live in the eastern US and Canada and as far west as Arizona.

Whereas flystrike occurs in rabbits with soiled fur, bot flies can infect even very clean rabbits. Even before the bump and hole are visible, the larvae are very painful and the rabbit may become depressed, weak, lose weight or even go into shock. The hole may become moist and cause secondary bacterial or fungal infections. The larvae can also migrate to the nasal cavity, eyes, trachea and brain.

Larvae are typically treated through careful removal by a veterinarian when they are identified. If the larvae are damaged, the rabbit can die from an anaphylactic reaction.

== Neoplasia ==
The most common tumor type of rabbits is uterine adenomcarcinoma, followed by neoplasia in hematopoietic organs, skin, mammary gland, testes, and the digestive system. Subsequently, female intact rabbits have highest prevalence of neoplasia (19.7%) as compared to all sex combined (prevalence: 14.4%). Overall prevalence of neoplasia continuously increases with age and may affect up to 45% of rabbits older than 6 years. Histologic criteria of malignancy is present in most tumor specimens and distant spread to other organs is common for lymphoma and uterine adenocarcinoma. Lymphoma commonly occur in younger rabbits and frequently affect lymph nodes, gastrointestinal tract, kidneys, spleen, and liver.
