= Cuterebra rufiventris =

Scientific classification
- Kingdom: Animalia
- Phylum: Arthropoda
- Class: Insecta
- Order: Diptera
- Family: Oestridae
- Genus: Cuterebra
- Species: C. rufiventris

Binomial name
- Cuterebra rufiventris Macquart, 1843

Synonyms
- Cuterebra elegans Bau, 1931; Cuterebra schmalzi Lutz, 1917

Species of fly

Cuterebra rufiventris is a species of fly that attack rodents and similar animals. It is found in Brazil and Peru.
