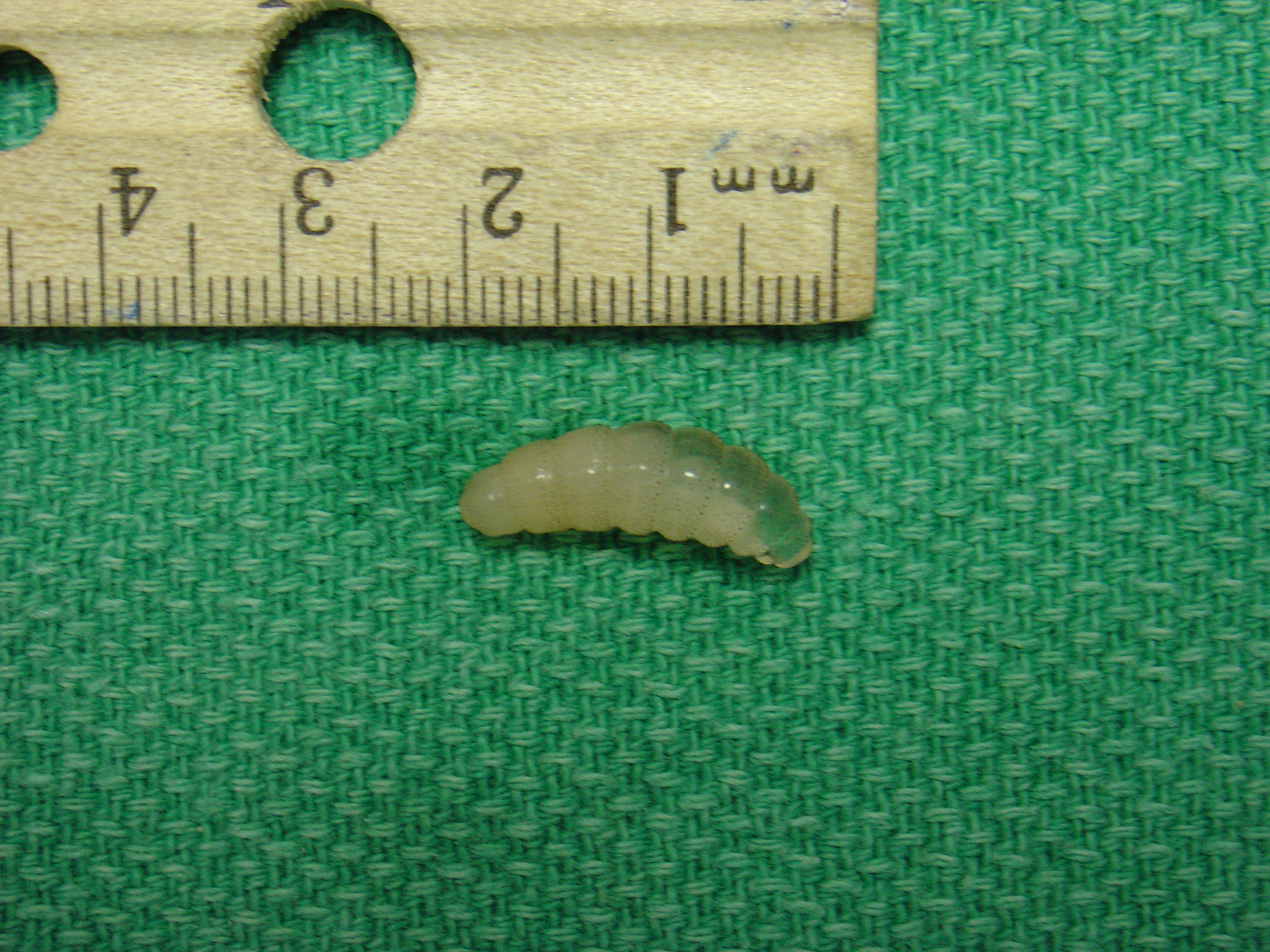
- A Cuterebra cuniculi individual that has been preserved in formaldehyde after being removed from a rabbit.

Scientific classification
- Kingdom: Animalia
- Phylum: Arthropoda
- Class: Insecta
- Order: Diptera
- Family: Oestridae
- Genus: Cuterebra
- Species: C. cuniculi

Binomial name
- Cuterebra cuniculi (Clark, 1797)

Synonyms
- Cuterebra horripilum Clark, 1815; Oestrus cuniculi Clark, 1797

= Cuterebra cuniculi =

Species of fly

Cuterebra cuniculi is a species of new world skin bot fly in the family Oestridae. Its range is restricted to the states of Georgia and Florida. Its larvae are parasites of the eastern cottontail and marsh rabbit.
