= Cuterebra approximata =

Scientific classification
- Kingdom: Animalia
- Phylum: Arthropoda
- Class: Insecta
- Order: Diptera
- Family: Oestridae
- Genus: Cuterebra
- Species: C. approximata

Binomial name
- Cuterebra approximata Walker, 1866

Synonyms
- Cuterebra cyanella Jones, 1906; Cuterebra nitida Coquillett, 1898

Species of fly

Cuterebra approximata is a species of new world skin bot fly in the family Oestridae. The larvae are typically parasites of Peromyscus maniculatus. Larvae typically go through three instars before emerging from the host to pupate in the morning. Adult flies also emerge from pupation in the morning.
