= Cuterebra americana =

Scientific classification
- Kingdom: Animalia
- Phylum: Arthropoda
- Class: Insecta
- Order: Diptera
- Family: Oestridae
- Genus: Cuterebra
- Species: C. americana

Binomial name
- Cuterebra americana (Fabricius, 1775)

Synonyms
- Cuterebra beameri Hall, 1943; Cuterebra cauterium Clark, 1815; Musca americana Fabricius, 1775

Species of fly

Cuterebra americana, the woodrat bot fly, is a species of new world skin bot fly in the family Oestridae.
