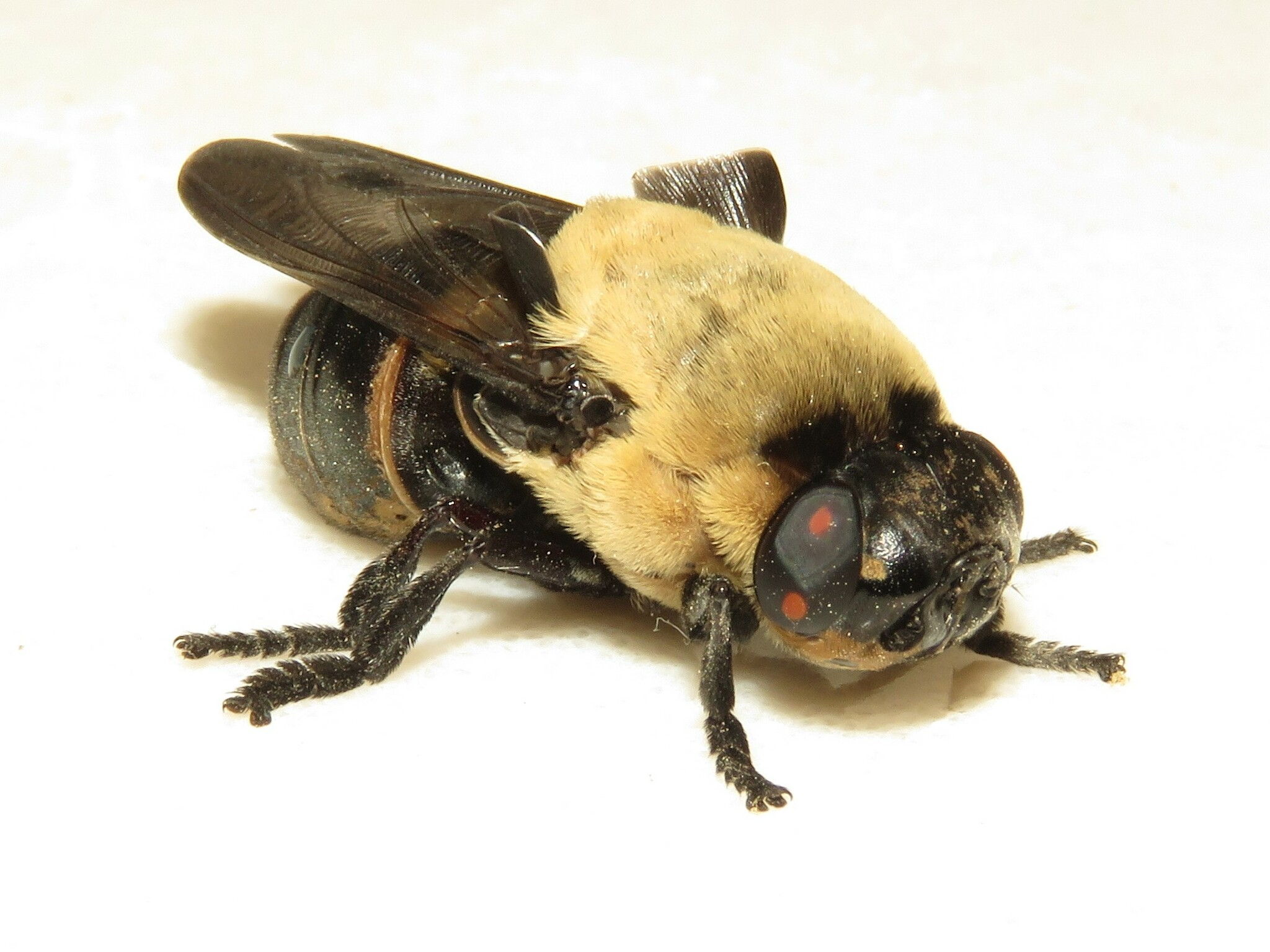

Scientific classification
- Kingdom: Animalia
- Phylum: Arthropoda
- Class: Insecta
- Order: Diptera
- Family: Oestridae
- Genus: Cuterebra
- Species: C. abdominalis

Binomial name
- Cuterebra abdominalis Swenk, 1905

= Cuterebra abdominalis =

Species of fly

Cuterebra abdominalis is a species of new world skin bot fly in the family Oestridae. They are a parasite of lagomorphs.
