= Cuterebra bajensis =

Scientific classification
- Kingdom: Animalia
- Phylum: Arthropoda
- Class: Insecta
- Order: Diptera
- Family: Oestridae
- Genus: Cuterebra
- Species: C. bajensis

Binomial name
- Cuterebra bajensis Sabrosky, 1986

Species of fly

Cuterebra bajensis is a species of new world skin bot flies in the family Oestridae.
