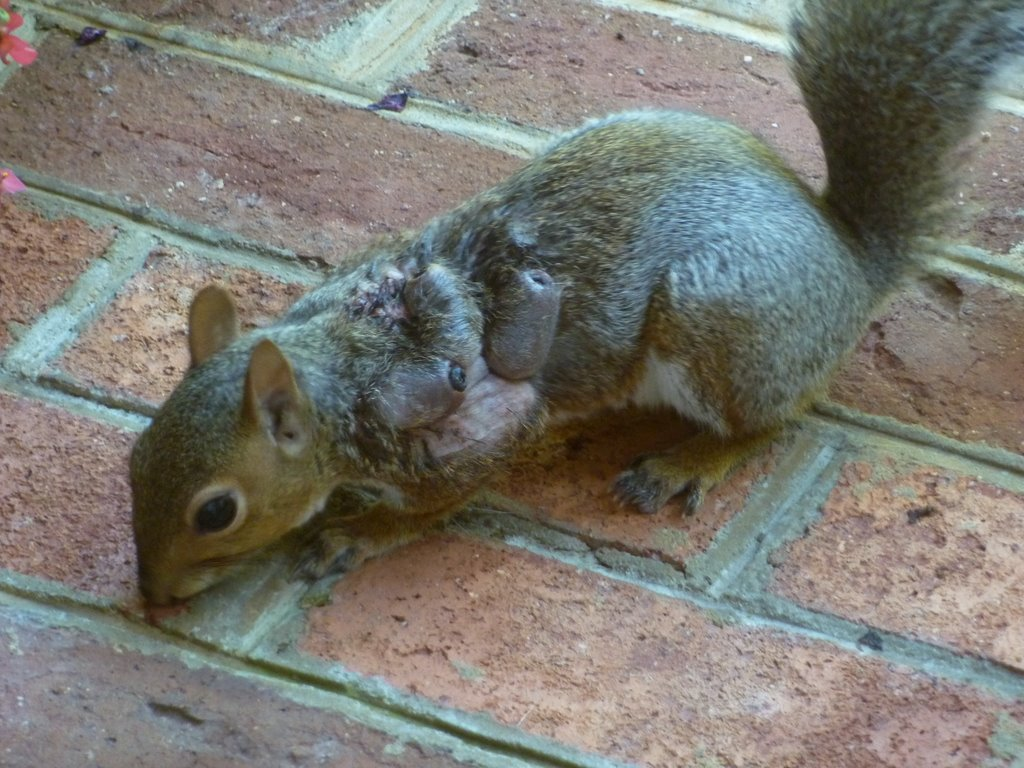
- Squirrel infested with Cuterebra

Scientific classification
- Kingdom: Animalia
- Phylum: Arthropoda
- Class: Insecta
- Order: Diptera
- Family: Oestridae
- Subfamily: Cuterebrinae
- Genus: Cuterebra; Clark 1815

Synonyms
- Alouattamya; Alouattamyia

= Cuterebra =

Genus of flies

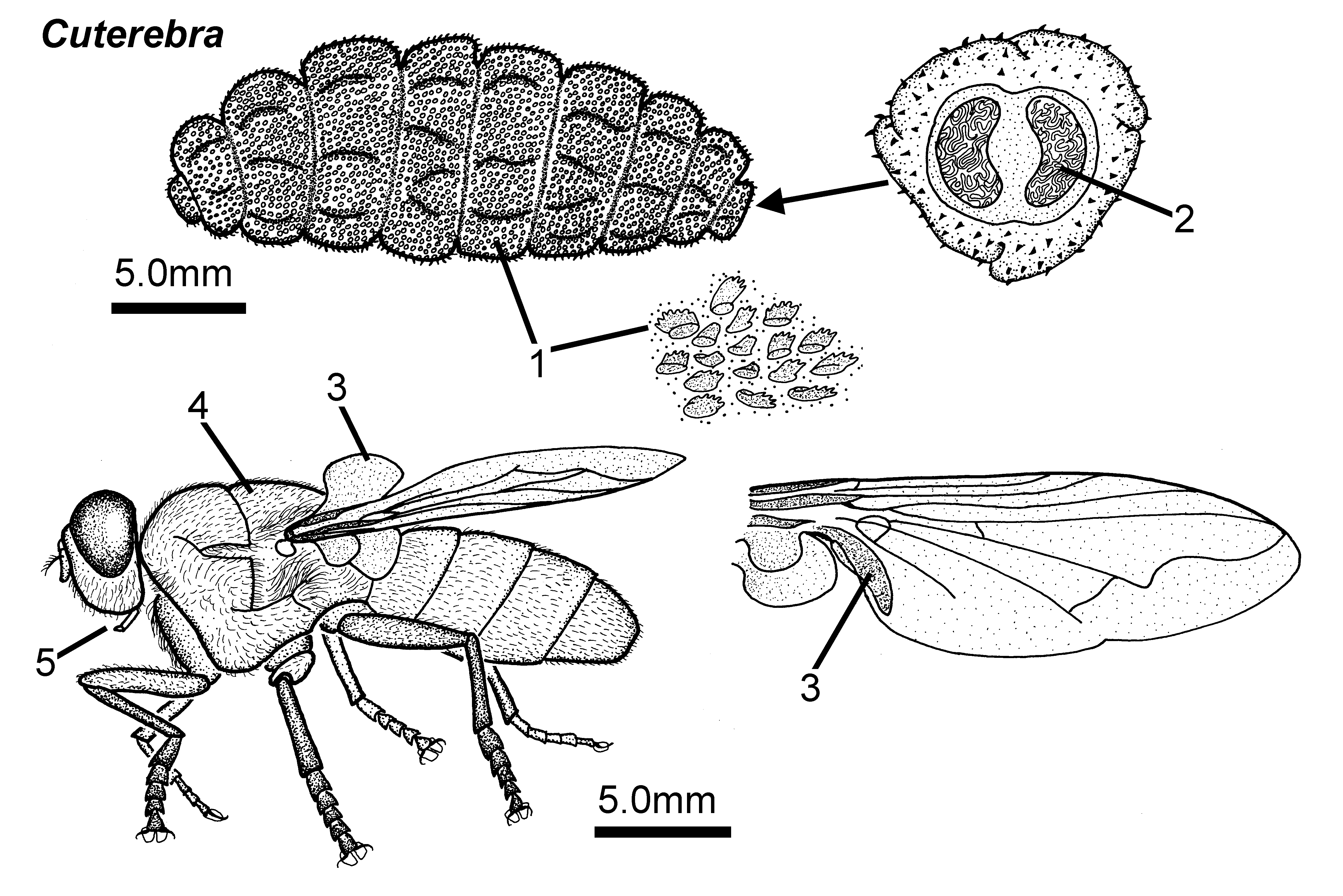
Cuterebra larva and adult

Cuterebra, or rodent bots, is a genus of bot flies that attack rodents and similar animals.

== Etymology ==
The genus name Cuterebra is a blend of the Latin words cutis 'skin' and terebra 'borer' with apparent shortening of expected Cutiterebra to Cuterebra.

== Species ==
These 78 species belong to the genus Cuterebra:

- Cuterebra abdominalis Swenk, 1905^{i c g b}
- Cuterebra albata Sabrosky, 1986^{i c g}
- Cuterebra albipilosa Sabrosky, 1986^{i c g b}
- Cuterebra almeidai (Guimaraes & Carrera, 1941)^{c g}
- Cuterebra americana (Fabricius, 1775)^{i c g b} (woodrat bot fly)
- Cuterebra apicalis Guérin-Méneville, 1835^{c g}
- Cuterebra approximata Walker, 1866^{i c g b}
- Cuterebra arizonae Sabrosky, 1986^{i c g b}
- Cuterebra atrox Clark^{i c g b}
- Cuterebra austeni Sabrosky, 1986^{i c g b}
- Cuterebra baeri Shannon & Greene, 1926^{c g}
- Cuterebra bajensis Sabrosky, 1986^{i c g b}
- Cuterebra buccata (Fabricius, 1776)^{i c g b} (rabbit bot fly)
- Cuterebra bureni Dalmat, 1942^{c g}
- Cuterebra cayennensis Macquart, 1843^{c g}
- Cuterebra clarki Sabrosky, 1986^{i c g}
- Cuterebra cochisei Sabrosky, 1986^{i c g b}
- Cuterebra cometes Shannon & Ponte, 1926
- Cuterebra conflans Bau, 1929
- Cuterebra cuniculi (Clark, 1797)^{i c g b}
- Cuterebra dasypoda Brauer, 1896^{c g}
- Cuterebra detrudator Clark, 1848^{c g}
- Cuterebra dorsalis Bau, 1929
- Cuterebra emasculator Fitch, 1856^{i c g b} (squirrel bot fly)
- Cuterebra enderleini Bau, 1929^{i c g}
- Cuterebra ephippium Latreille, 1818^{c g}
- Cuterebra fasciata Swenk, 1905^{i c g}
- Cuterebra fassleri Guimaraes, 1984^{c g}
- Cuterebra flaviventris (Bau, 1931)^{c g}
- Cuterebra fontinella Clark, 1827^{i c g b} (mouse bot fly)
- Cuterebra funebris (Austen, 1895)^{c g}
- Cuterebra gilvopilosa Bau, 1932^{c g}
- Cuterebra grandis (Guérin-Méneville, 1844)^{c g}
- Cuterebra grisea Coquillett, 1904^{i c g}
- Cuterebra histrio Coquillett, 1902^{c g}
- Cuterebra indistincta Sabrosky, 1986^{i c g}
- Cuterebra infulata Lutz, 1917^{c g}
- Cuterebra jellisoni Curran, 1942^{i c g b}
- Cuterebra latifrons Coquillett, 1898^{i c g b}
- Cuterebra lepida Austen, 1933
- Cuterebra lepivora Coquillett, 1898^{i c g b}
- Cuterebra lepusculi Townsend, 1897^{i c g b} (cottontail rabbit botfly)
- Cuterebra lopesi Guimaraes, 1990^{c g}
- Cuterebra lutzi Bau, 1930^{c g}
- Cuterebra maculosa Knab, 1914^{c g}
- Cuterebra megastoma Brauer, 1863^{c g}
- Cuterebra mirabilis Sabrosky, 1986^{i c g b}
- Cuterebra neomexicana Sabrosky, 1986^{i c g b}
- Cuterebra nigricans Lutz, 1917
- Cuterebra obscuriventris Sabrosky, 1986^{i c g}
- Cuterebra ornata Bau, 1928^{c g}
- Cuterebra patagona Guérin-Méneville, 1844^{c g}
- Cuterebra pessoai Guimaraes & Carrera, 1941^{c g}
- Cuterebra polita Coquillett, 1898^{i c g b}
- Cuterebra postica Sabrosky, 1986^{c g}
- Cuterebra praegrandis Austen, 1933^{c g}
- Cuterebra princeps (Austen, 1895)^{i c g}
- Cuterebra pulchra Bau, 1930
- Cuterebra pusilla Bau, 1931
- Cuterebra pygmae Bau, 1931
- Cuterebra rubiginosa Bau, 1931
- Cuterebra ruficrus (Austen, 1933)^{i c g b}
- Cuterebra rufiventris Macquart, 1843^{c g}
- Cuterebra sabroskyi Guimaraes, 1984^{c g}
- Cuterebra sarcophagoides Lutz, 1917
- Cuterebra schmalzi Lutz, 1917
- Cuterebra semiatra (Wiedemann, 1830)^{c g}
- Cuterebra semilutea Bau, 1929^{c g}
- Cuterebra simulans Austen, 1933^{c g}
- Cuterebra sterilator Lugger, 1897^{i c g}
- Cuterebra sternopleuralis Sabrosky, 1986^{i c g}
- Cuterebra sternpleuralis Sabrosky, 1986
- Cuterebra tenebriformis Sabrosky, 1986^{i c g}
- Cuterebra tenebrosa Coquillett, 1898^{i c g b} (rodent bot fly)
- Cuterebra terrisona Walker, 1849^{c g}
- Cuterebra townsendi (Fonseca, 1941)^{c g}
- Cuterebra trigonophora Brauer, 1863^{c g}
- Cuterebra worontzowi Guimaraes & Carrera, 1941

Data sources: i = ITIS, c = Catalogue of Life, g = GBIF, b = Bugguide.net

== See also ==
- Cuterebriasis
