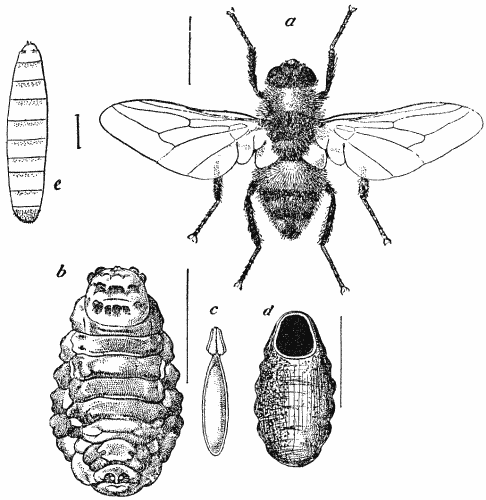
- Hypoderma bovis

Scientific classification
- Domain: Eukaryota
- Kingdom: Animalia
- Phylum: Arthropoda
- Class: Insecta
- Order: Diptera
- Family: Oestridae
- Subfamily: Hypodermatinae

Genera
- Hypoderma Latreille, 1818; Oestroderma; Oestromyia Latreille, 1818; 6 others

= Hypodermatinae =

Subfamily of flies

The Hypodermatinae are a subfamily of Oestridae. The Hypodermatinae include large parasitic flies, some of which are known as warble flies. The 9 genera in this subfamily typically spend their larval stages in the skin or soft tissues of mammals, including bovines. Such species include serious pests of livestock.

== Genera ==
Hypodermatinae includes 9 genera:

- Hypoderma
- Ochotonia
- Oestroderma
- Oestromyia
- Pallasiomyia
- Pavlovskiata
- Portschinskia
- Przhevalskiana
- Strobiloestrus
