= Cuterebra ruficrus =

Scientific classification
- Kingdom: Animalia
- Phylum: Arthropoda
- Class: Insecta
- Order: Diptera
- Family: Oestridae
- Genus: Cuterebra
- Species: C. ruficrus

Binomial name
- Cuterebra ruficrus (Austen, 1933)

Synonyms
- Bogeria ruficrus Austen, 1933

Species of fly

Cuterebra ruficrus is a species of new world skin bot fly in the family Oestridae.
