= Cuterebra atrox =

Scientific classification
- Kingdom: Animalia
- Phylum: Arthropoda
- Class: Insecta
- Order: Diptera
- Family: Oestridae
- Genus: Cuterebra
- Species: C. atrox

Binomial name
- Cuterebra atrox Clark

Synonyms
- Cuterebra similis Johnson, 1903

Species of fly

Cuterebra atrox is a species of new world skin bot fly in the family Oestridae.
