= Cuterebra emasculator =

Scientific classification
- Kingdom: Animalia
- Phylum: Arthropoda
- Clade: Pancrustacea
- Class: Insecta
- Order: Diptera
- Family: Oestridae
- Genus: Cuterebra
- Species: C. emasculator

Binomial name
- Cuterebra emasculator Fitch, 1856

Synonyms
- Cuterebra scutellaris Brauer, 1863

Species of fly

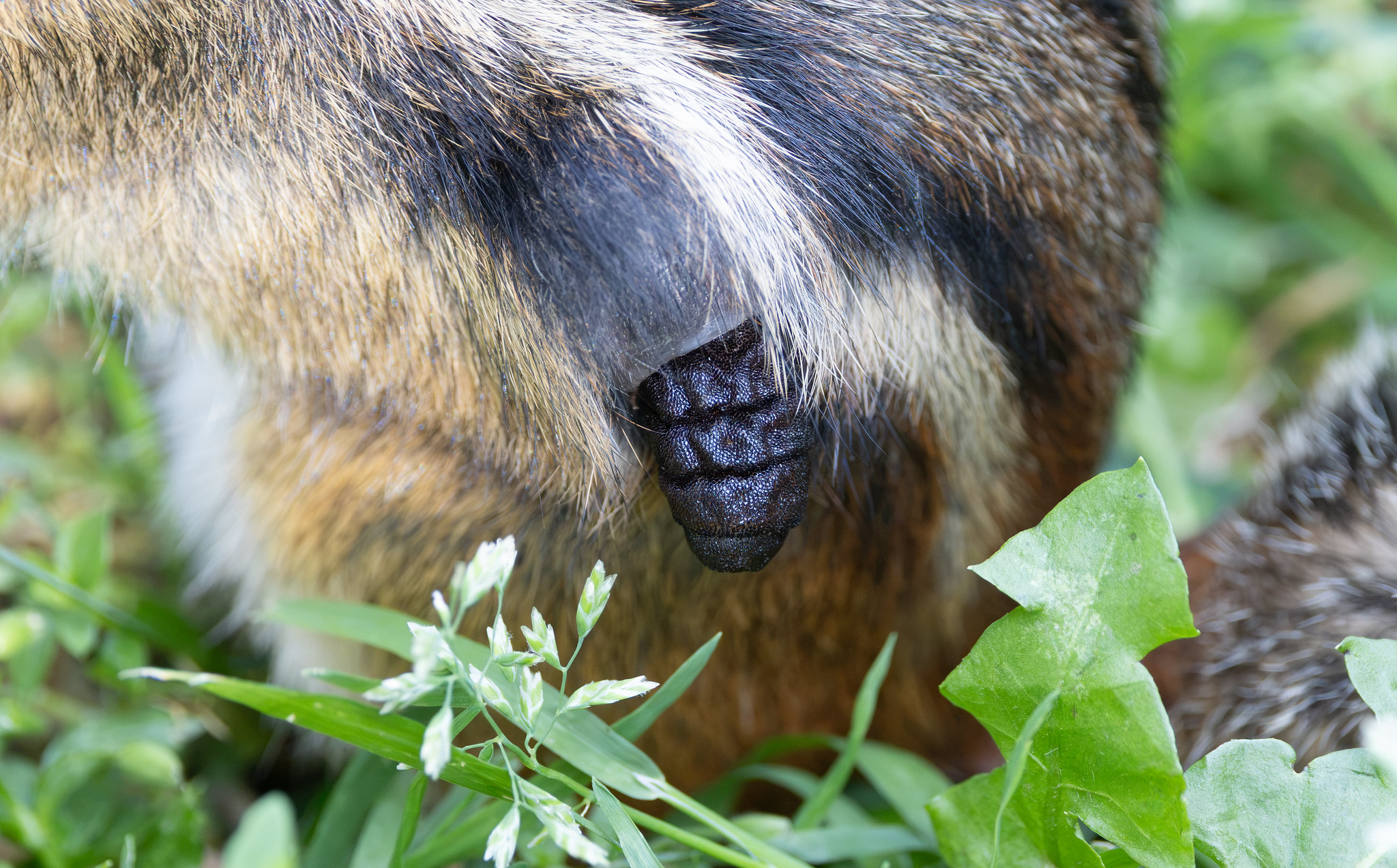
Botfly emerging from an Eastern Chipmunk. (Closeup)

Cuterebra emasculator, the squirrel bot fly, is a species of new world skin bot fly in the family Oestridae. The species was first described by Asa Fitch in 1856. It is an internal parasite of chipmunks and tree squirrels in the eastern United States. The species' name comes from the belief that larvae ate the testicles of chipmunks. This belief is false, as parasitism by the larvae of these flies does not result in lower fertility - chipmunks mate in the spring, while botfly infections occur in the summer, and the larva do not impede sperm production as they reside below the skin.

The adult Cuterebra emasculator looks rather like a dully colored bumblebee. It emerges in early summer and searches for a mate. Females lay as many as 1,000 eggs, which look like grains of rice, on twigs, branches, and vegetation where a host might come by. The larva develops within the egg into the first instar and then waits to emerge through the operculum (sort of a trap door) at one end of the chorion (what we call the eggshell in insects) until it senses heat or carbon dioxide from a nearby host. Then it pops out and sways back and forth on the substrate until it contacts a host animal and moves around searching for an opening—the mouth, nostrils, anus, or an open wound.

Once inside the host's body, it moves around for about a week until it finds a spot under the pelt to settle in. It molts into the second instar and creates a visible hole to the outside, called a “warble pore,” that lets air in for breathing and allows it to eliminate excrement. The anterior end of the larva is inside the host, the posterior end at the pore. The host’s tissue surrounding the larva forms a pocket, or “warble,” that encapsulates the larva and feels rather hard.

After a week or so in the warble, the larva molts into its third, final instar. It is pale to begin with, like the first and second instar stages, but is covered with cuticular platelets that stiffen and darken, eventually becoming dark brown. It takes about four weeks from hatching until the larva is mature; it backs out through the warble pore, drops to the ground, and burrows into the soil to pupate. The dark brown pupa remains in the soil through autumn, winter, and spring, and emerges as an adult the following summer to start the whole process again.

As with most obligate parasites who spend an important part of their life cycle in a host and must emerge while the host is still living, botflies seldom do permanent damage to their hosts as long as the squirrel or chipmunk was an active adult or juvenile, so most squirrels and chipmunks survive with little or no longterm effects.

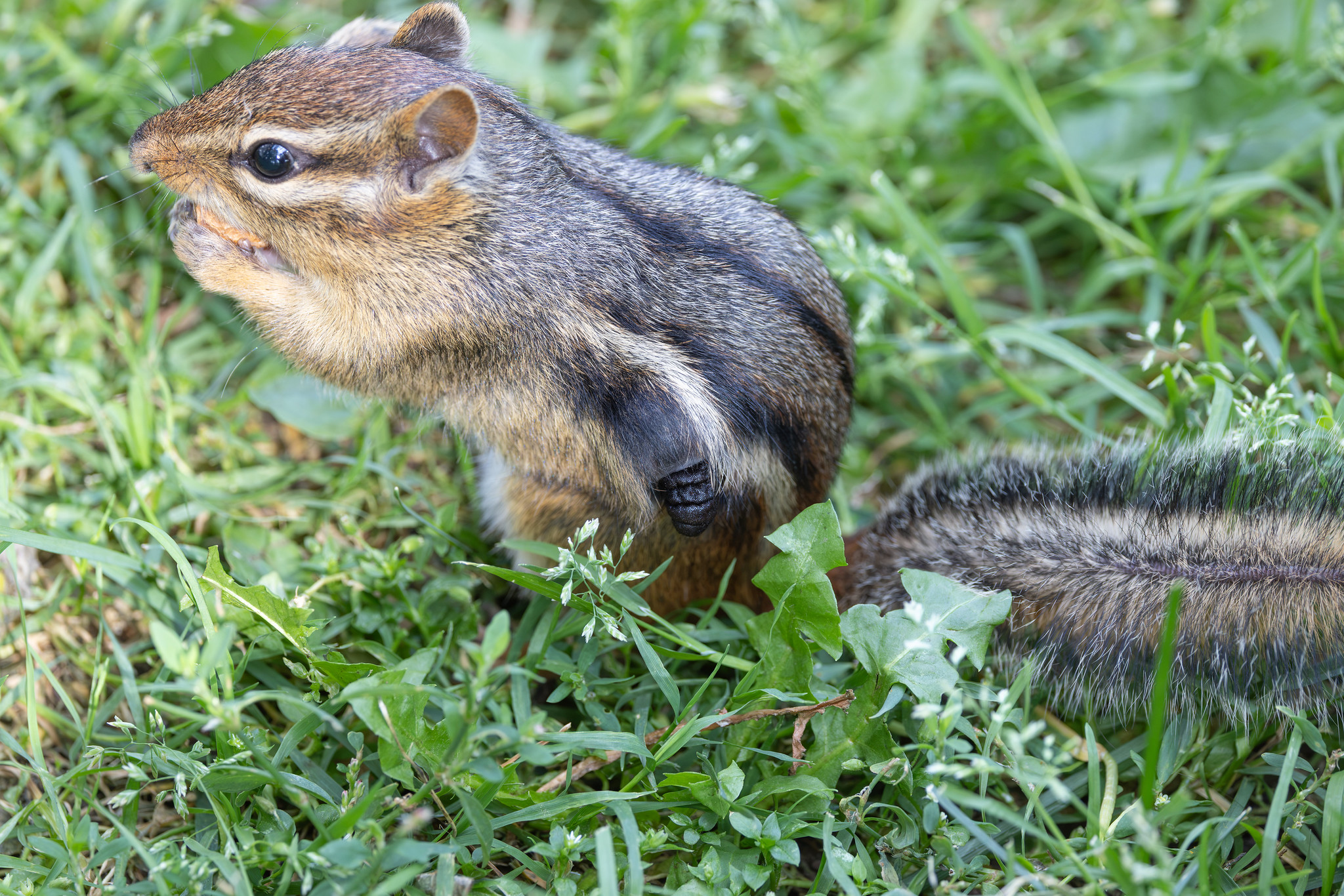
Botfly emerging from eastern chipmunk

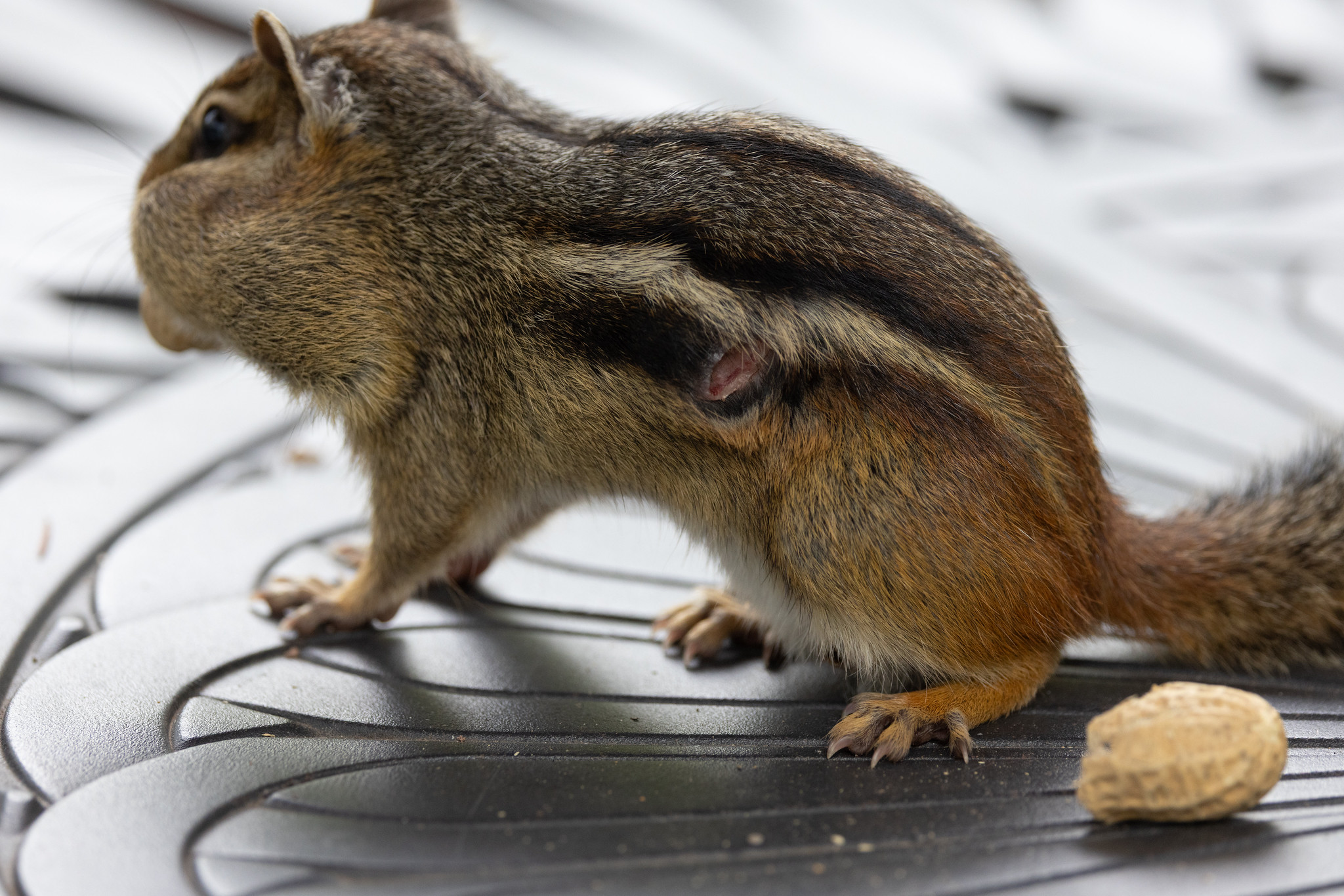
This chipmunk had a botfly that emerged a few hours before this photo was taken.
