= Cuterebra lepusculi =

Scientific classification
- Kingdom: Animalia
- Phylum: Arthropoda
- Class: Insecta
- Order: Diptera
- Family: Oestridae
- Genus: Cuterebra
- Species: C. lepusculi

Binomial name
- Cuterebra lepusculi Townsend, 1897

Synonyms
- Cuterebra albifrons Swenk, 1905; Cuterebra subbuccata Bau, 1929

Species of fly

Cuterebra lepusculi, the cottontail rabbit botfly, is a species of new world skin bot fly in the family Oestridae.
