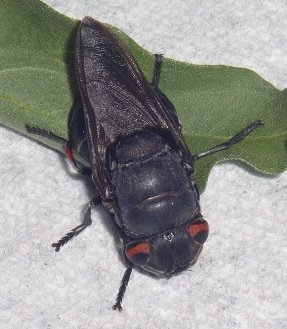

Scientific classification
- Kingdom: Animalia
- Phylum: Arthropoda
- Class: Insecta
- Order: Diptera
- Family: Oestridae
- Genus: Cuterebra
- Species: C. mirabilis

Binomial name
- Cuterebra mirabilis Sabrosky, 1986

= Cuterebra mirabilis =

Species of fly

Cuterebra mirabilis is a species of New World skin bot fly in the family Oestridae.
