= Cuterebra polita =

Scientific classification
- Kingdom: Animalia
- Phylum: Arthropoda
- Class: Insecta
- Order: Diptera
- Family: Oestridae
- Genus: Cuterebra
- Species: C. polita

Binomial name
- Cuterebra polita Coquillett, 1898

Synonyms
- Cuterebra thomomuris Jellison, 1949

Species of fly

Cuterebra polita is a species of new world skin bot fly in the family Oestridae.
