= Cuterebra jellisoni =

Scientific classification
- Kingdom: Animalia
- Phylum: Arthropoda
- Class: Insecta
- Order: Diptera
- Family: Oestridae
- Genus: Cuterebra
- Species: C. jellisoni

Binomial name
- Cuterebra jellisoni Curran, 1942

Species of fly

Cuterebra jellisoni is a species of new world skin bot fly in the family Oestridae.
