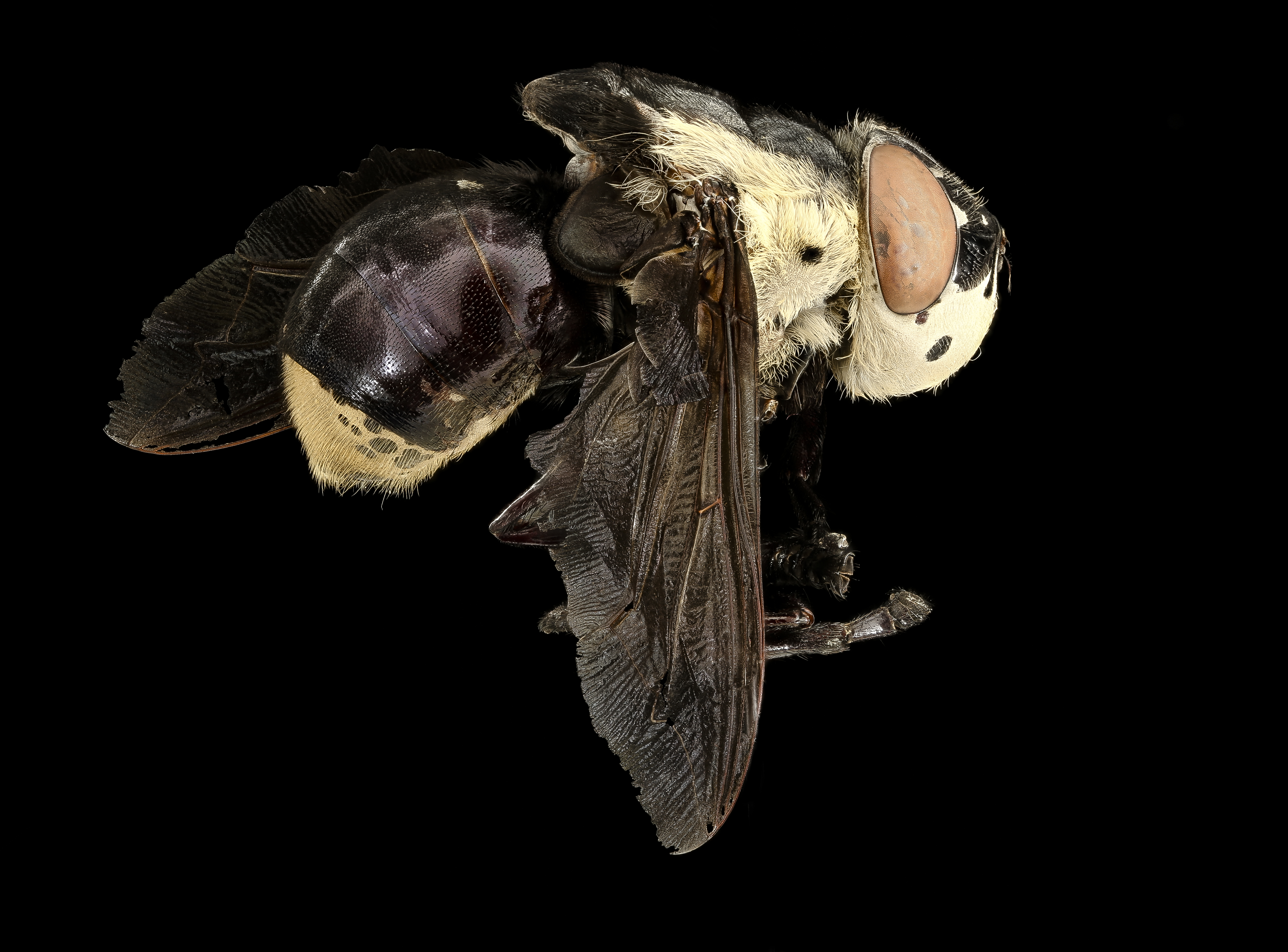
- Mouse bot fly

Scientific classification
- Kingdom: Animalia
- Phylum: Arthropoda
- Clade: Pancrustacea
- Class: Insecta
- Order: Diptera
- Family: Oestridae
- Genus: Cuterebra
- Species: C. fontinella

Binomial name
- Cuterebra fontinella Clark, 1827

Synonyms
- Cuterebra angustifrons Dalmat, 1942; Cuterebra peromysci Dalmat, 1942

= Cuterebra fontinella =

Species of fly

Cuterebra fontinella, the mouse bot fly, is a species of New World skin bot fly in the family Oestridae. C. fontinella is typically around 1 cm (0.39 in) in length with a black and yellow color pattern. C. fontinella develops by parasitizing nutrients from its host, typically the white-footed mouse. C. fontinella has even been known to parasitize humans in rare cases. Individuals parasitized by C. fontinella will develop a large bump on the skin that is indicative of parasitization.

== Etymology ==
The genus name Cuterebra is a blend of the Latin words cutis : skin and terebra : borer with apparent shortening of expected Cutiterebra to Cuterebra.

== Distribution ==
C. fontinella is found all around North America, including in most of the continental United States, southern Canada, and northern Mexico. The prevalence of C. fontinella is dependent upon temperature. Colder regions will not be as densely populated as the warmer ones.

== Habitat ==
C. fontinella inhabits deciduous forests of North America. C. fontinella prefer territories near running water and with low-elevation vegetation. These flies are found in the highest density near the edges of their habitats.

== Description ==
C. fontinella look very similar to other species within the genus Cuterebra but have a few distinguishing features. The easiest indicator to use is the host species, as different species of Cuterebra infest different hosts. However, this method is not always reliable as C. fontinella have been known to infest multiple host species in addition to their preferred host, Peromyscus leucopus, the white-footed mouse. C. fontinella eggs are typically 1.05 mm (0.041 in) long and 0.03 mm wide. They are shaped like canoes and have a large groove along their underside; this groove enables attachment to vegetation. C. fontinella larvae transition from golden brown to black during development. The larvae are oval in shape. Grown larvae are typically 22 mm (0.87 in) long, 13.9 mm (0.55 in) wide, and 12.5 mm (0.49 in) thick. The larva is segmented into 12 sections, with backwards facing conical spines on almost every segment. The head segment is shield shaped, colored white or tan, contains antennal pits and retractable mandibles. The 12th segment bears two spiracles and is also lightly colored. However, the spines on this segment are outward facing. Adult C. fontinella have black hair on their scutum and a black spot on their anipisterum. Adults are typically 30 mm (1.2 in) and have a close resemblance to bees.

== Home range and territoriality ==
C. fontinella flies are territorial insects. Males chase away intruding males while patrolling their territory by flying in figure-eight and oval patterns. Since females only fly when looking for a mate, the male tries to control as much high-quality territory as he can. They congregate above heat-reflecting surfaces on roadsides and near streams. These flies are very dependent on temperature; though they can live in a vast array of latitudes, the climate they live in influences their prevalence throughout the year.

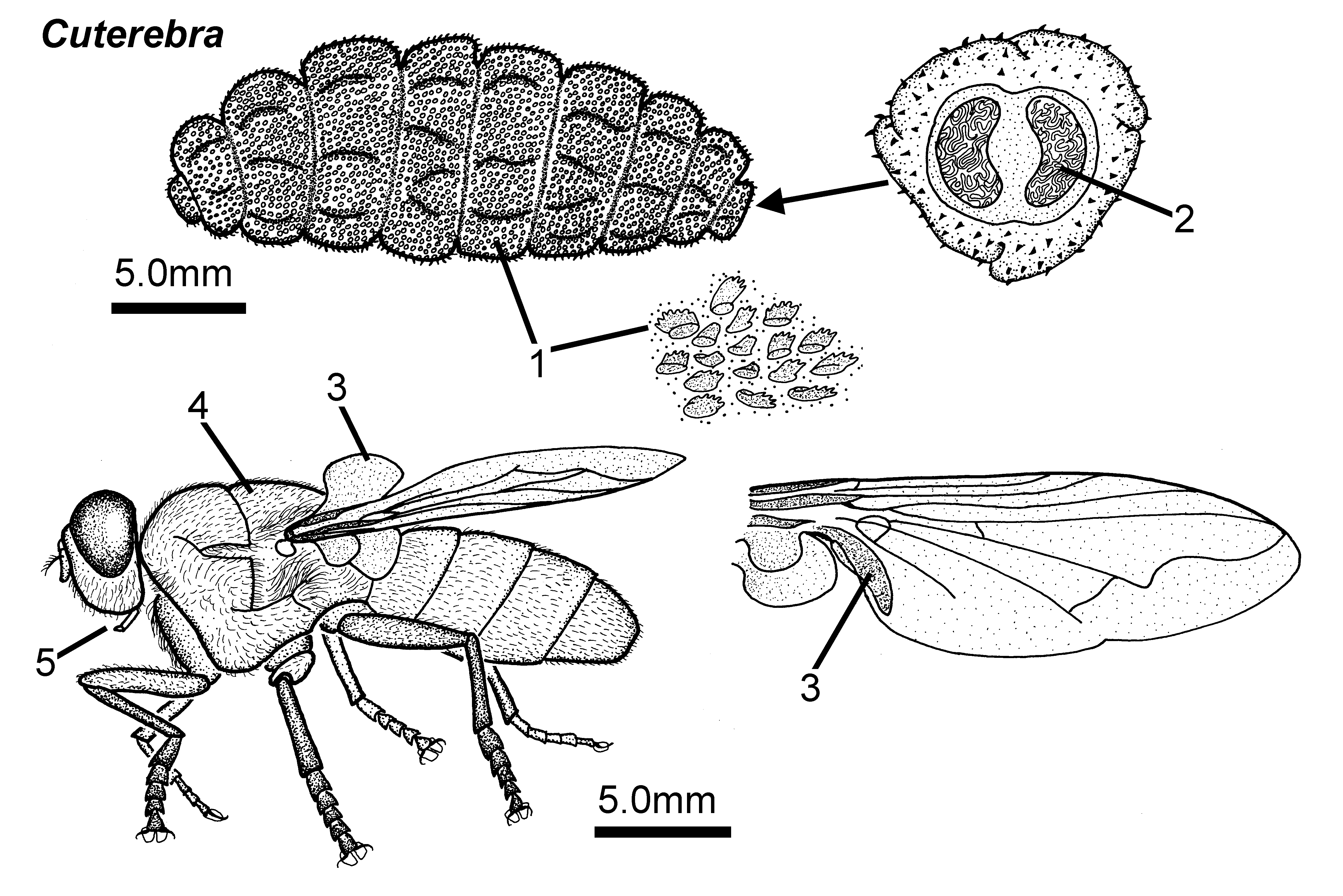
Various life stages of Cuterebra flies

== Life history ==
=== Eggs ===
Egg development is slowed by temperatures below 15 °C (59 °F) and under arid atmosphere conditions. The ideal conditions for development are warm and humid, characteristic of southern climates. Stimulation from moisture and heat (often from the host passing by the egg) will cause the egg to hatch and the larva to be rubbed onto the host.

=== Larval instars ===
Once on the host, the larva enters through the nose, mouth, eyes, anus, or any open wound. Inside the body, the larva migrates and settles near the groin, then creates a “warble” with a small hole at the top layer of skin for breathing. The backward-facing spikes on the segments of the larva help to stabilize it by preventing the larva from being pulled out of the host by gripping to the flesh surrounding it. The larvae typically emerge after the host dies (typically 3.5–4 weeks), and then burrow into the ground.

=== Pupae ===
C. fontinella pupates in the ground and emerges as an adult. Diapause can occur during winter or other general unfavorable conditions. Pupae can remain in diapause for as long as 12 months if need be. In simulated standard settings (27 °C and an alternating day and night light schedule), pupal development typically occurs in 50 days.

=== Adults ===
Adults of C. fontinella live a short life without feeding. Oocyte development begins as soon as females leave the pupal stage of development. Oocyte development finishes in about 5 days. Mating can occur before oocyte development is finished. No secondary egg development occurs, likely due to the short adult lifespan of C. fontinella. Female C. fontinella females typically lay their eggs in vegetation, especially that located near the homes/burrows of their intended hosts. Adult females can lay up to 2000 eggs.

== Parasitism ==
=== Migration within the host ===
After entering the body, the larvae follow a distinct path within the host. If entering either through the nose, mouth, or eyes, the larvae first orient themselves using the host's nasal passageway. Then they travel through the upper respiratory system, making their way to the thoracic cavity. They then proceed to the abdominal cavity and eventually to the inguinal region of the host. If the larvae enter the host through an open wound or the anus, they find the closest portion of the standard tract, then continue their journey as they normally would.

==== Warbles ====
Once settled, the larva creates areas of swelling in the subcutaneous skin layer of their host. These swellings, known as warbles, are located between the anus and genital organs of the host. They last the same amount of time that the larva spends in its larval stage (3.5-4.0 weeks). The warble consists of a pore, a cavity, and a capsule. The pore serves as a breathing hole for the larva. As the larva grows, the size of the warble grows with it. Translucent yellow liquids are secreted from the larva. The cavity is the area of the warble where the larva lives. It expands gradually as the larva grows in size. The capsule is the tissue that surrounds the cavity. The capsule starts off as thin tissue, and thickens as larval development continues due to natural bodily healing of the host.

=== Effect on host ===
==== Effect on individual ====
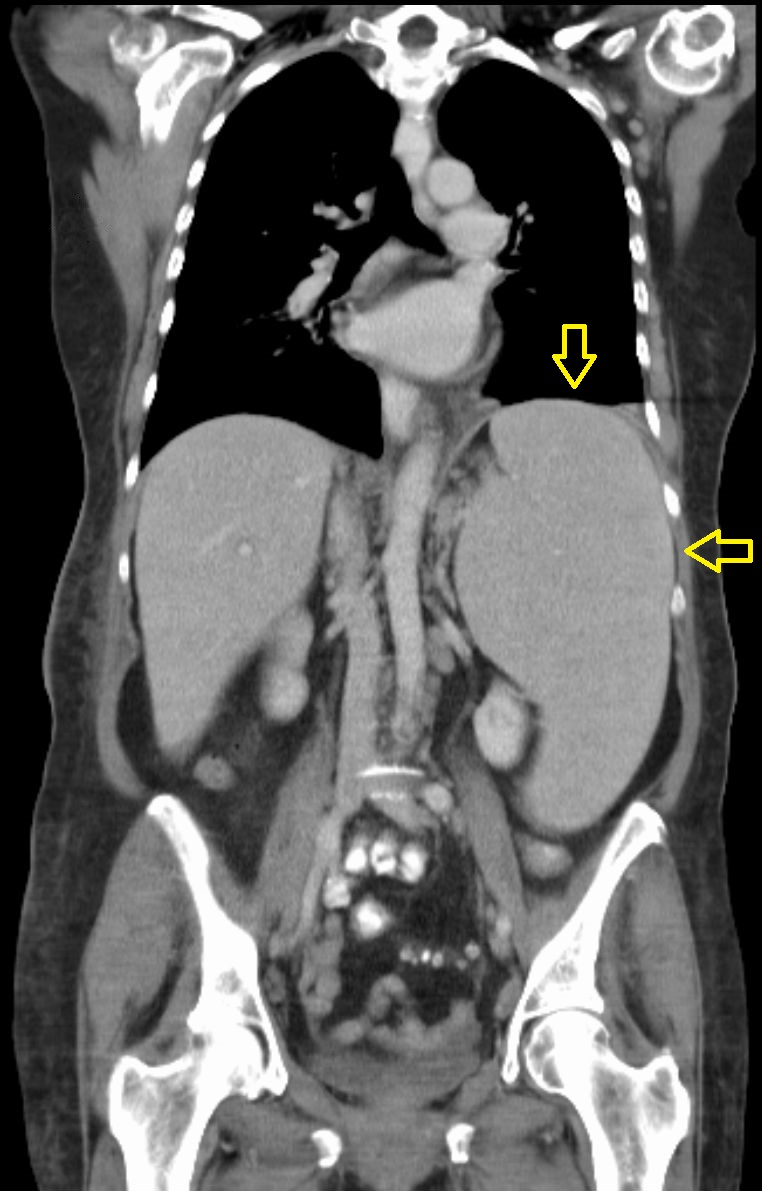
Splenomegaly, which can be caused by the cuterebra fly

Individuals infested with C. fontinella can experience anemia, leukocytosis, plasma protein imbalances, local tissue damage, and splenomegaly. Infested female hosts produce fewer and smaller litters than those that are parasite-free. Counterintuitively, infestation actually leads to an increase in survival time for the host, not a decrease in survival as one would expect. This could be caused by the change in resource allocation from reproduction to body preservation, a change that is favorable for both the host's and the C. fontinella's survival. Interestingly, if multiple C. fontinella larvae infest a host simultaneously, the host instead experiences a decrease in survival time.

==== Host resistance ====
Resistance to infestation has been documented in hosts that have been previously infested. The resistance occurs at the entry points that have been used previously by larvae, as well as the genital region of the host where the larva typically creates the warble. Nasal, oral, and anal resistance cause a decrease in infestation rate when exposed to larvae of 15-30%. No resistance from repeated ocular entry occurs. Maximum antibody production from the host occurs 28 days after infestation. The resistance causes the larvae to take abnormal alternate paths within the host. These abnormal paths caused the larvae to develop in atypical regions in the host. The insecticide Ronnel can be used to effectively stop development of larvae by preventing the larvae from boring breathing holes in the skin of the host.

=== Effect on population ===
Infestation has varying effects on the host population's reproductive fitness, depending on the size of the habitat and the infestation rate of C. fontinella. If the host population lives in a vast habitat with scattered areas of infestation, the reproductive rate of the host is essentially unaffected. However, in smaller habitats with higher and more uniform rates of infestation, reproductive rates can be noticeably decreased.

== Food resources ==
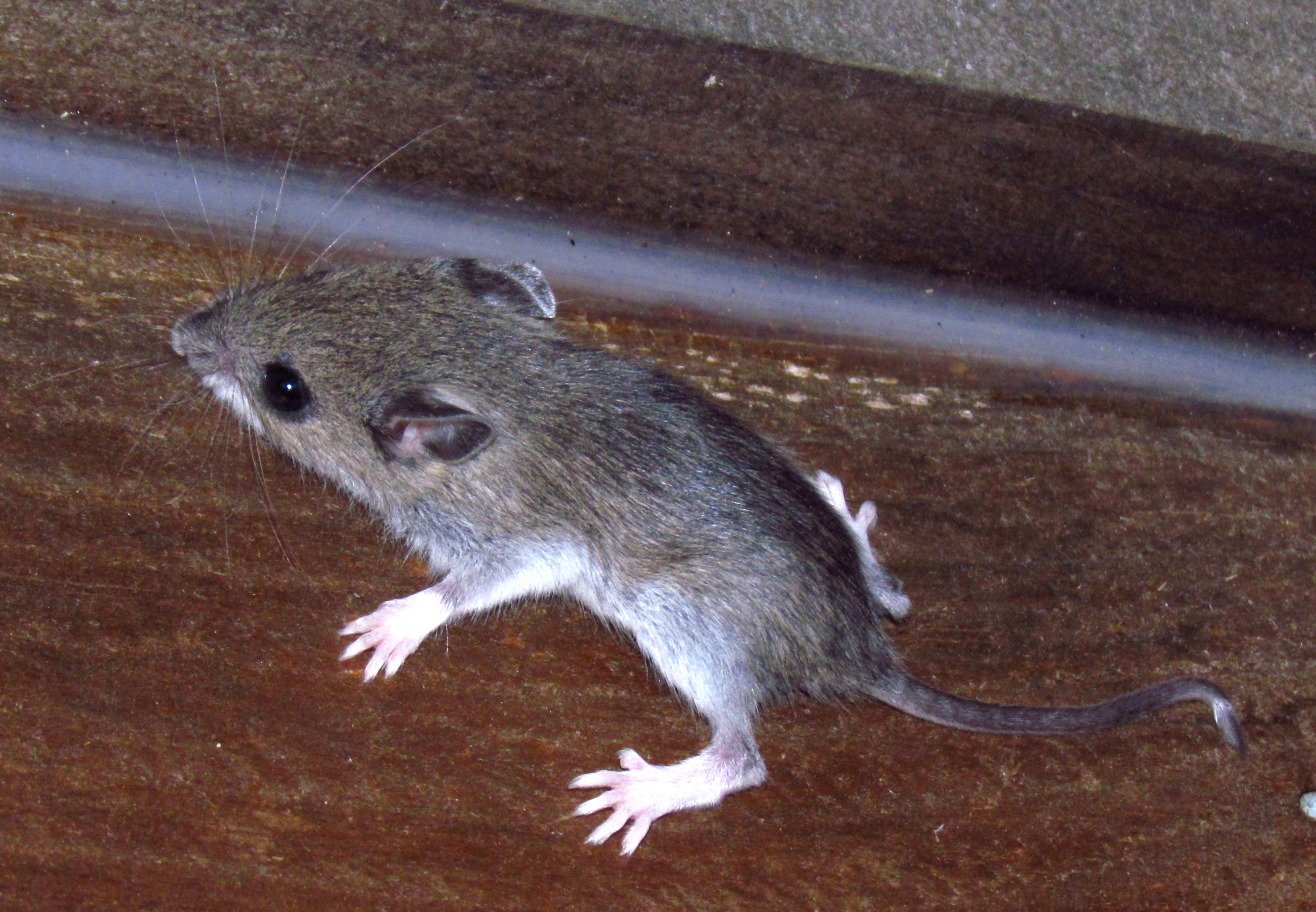
White-footed mouse is a common host of C. fontinella.

The host serves as the primary food source. Different species of Cuterebra prey on various species of rodents. However, C. fontinella has been documented as preying on several different species of rodents. Peromyscus leucopus (white-footed mouse) is the favored host for C. fontinella. Typically, 19%-33% of all P. leucopus are infested within a year. Other hosts for C. fontinella include Lepus artemisia (cottontail rabbit), Ochrotomys nuttalli (golden mouse), P. gossypinus (cotton mouse), P. maniculatus (eastern deer mouse), Heteromys irroratus (mexican spiny pocket mouse), and even very rarely humans. The highest infestation rates occur in late summer and early fall.

== Mating ==
Adults aggregate in open, sunny areas to find their mates. However, C. fontinella does not mate at temperatures below 20 °C. Adult males fly 1–2 m above the ground for up to 4 hours a day in the presence of sunlight to attract a mate. Once a female demonstrates her interest, the pair finds a nearby branch or leaf for stability. The female grabs the branch or leaf and the male mounts her. The pair copulates for about 3 minutes.

Ovipositor

The ovipositor of C. fontinella is unusually short relative those of the other members of the family Oestridae. Covered by dense hairs, the ovipositor resembles a horseshoe, with two sclerite ends and a chitinous plate between them.

== Social behavior ==
Males of C. fontinella fly around their territories from the time at which the temperature exceeds 20 °C to the early afternoon. Flight is initiated only during sunlight, but can continue during brief cloud coverage not exceeding 15 minutes. Since their flight is limited by temperature, the amount of time spent flying is dependent on the weather and temperature of the day. Females of C. fontinella are only seen flying when searching for a mate. Males are extremely territorial, and usually occupy a stretch of territory 17 m long, along the bank of a stream. They chase most airborne intruders that travel through their territory, regardless of their species. If two males intersect in the air, they grab onto each other and tumble to the ground. Chases persist for 10–15 minutes. C. fontinella tolerates a population density of up to 250 flies/km^{2}. Fly density varies depending on weather conditions and the time of the year.

== Genetic identification ==
Genetic analysis can also be used to discriminate between species. COI and COII genes are reliable markers to differentiate between species. Using species specific markers, scientists can accurately identify the species of a botfly at any stage of life. In many cases larvae look ambiguous enough to be confused for another species, so genetic identification is very important. Hybridization between species within the genus Cuterebra has been known to occur, and can cause ambiguity within testing.

=== Subspecies ===
The two subspecies of C. fontinella are C. f. fontinella and C. f. grisea (deer mouse bot fly).

== Interactions with humans ==
Rare cases of C. fontinella host infestations have been reported, but are not the norm. In most cases, the larvae remain in relatively benign locations such as in the eye or in the subcutaneous regions within the eyelid. Occasionally, however, the larvae gain access to the tracheal-pulmonary system. Consequent symptoms in the human host include cold-like symptoms and flares of coughing. The larvae are expelled from the human host when the host coughs out a bloody secretion containing the larva.

Another species of bot fly called Dermatobia hominis (human botfly) commonly infests humans in Central and South America. Most cases of human infestation within North America are caused by the victim traveling into regions where D. hominis is present. As of 1989, 55 cases of myiasis caused by species within the Cuterebra genus have been documented. Treatment typically consists of removal of the larva and then prevention of secondary bacterial infections. If the warble is accessible, one can remove the larva by depositing petroleum jelly over the breathing hole of the parasite; this causes the larva to emerge for air and enable easier removal. Larvae within or near the eye sometimes require surgery for removal. Larvae that die within the vitreous humor of the eye do not need to be removed, they are broken down and absorbed by natural chemical processes within the host.

== Conservation ==
A major threat to infestation rates of C. fontinella is pasture burning. When soil reaches high temperatures, pupating larvae die, and ash produced during burning causes microclimate changes. These changes contribute significantly to increasing greater congregation of C. fontinella.
