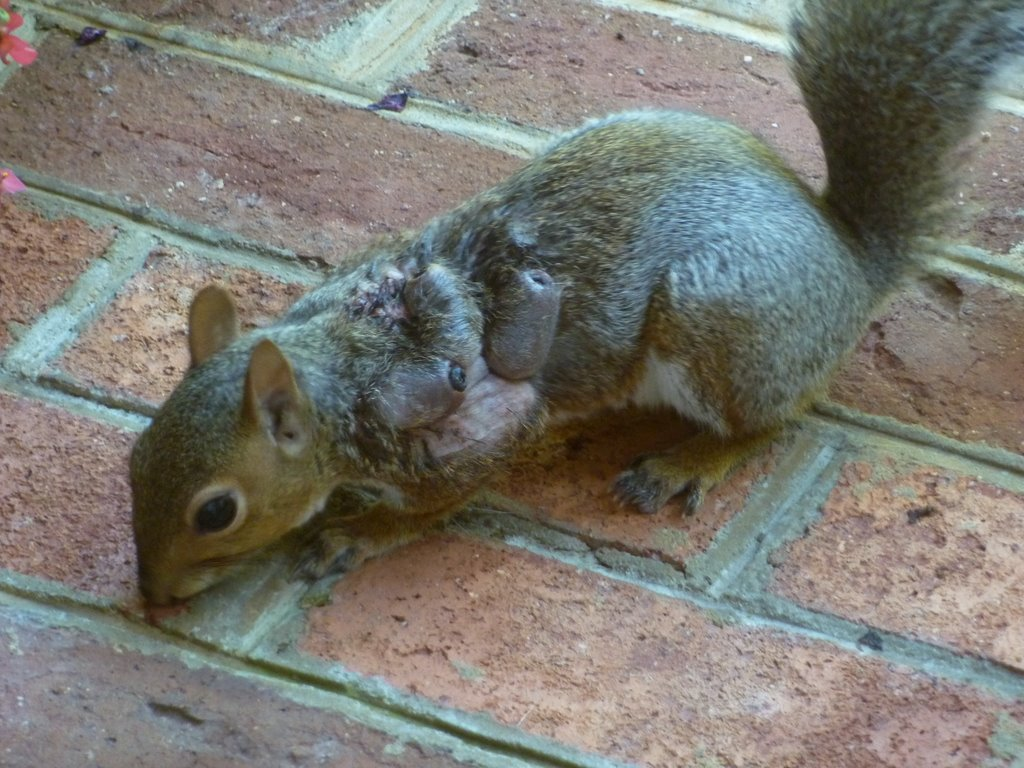
- Squirrel infested with Cuterebra

Scientific classification
- Domain: Eukaryota
- Kingdom: Animalia
- Phylum: Arthropoda
- Class: Insecta
- Order: Diptera
- Family: Oestridae
- Subfamily: Cuterebrinae

Genera
- Cuterebra Clark 1815; Dermatobia

= Cuterebrinae =

Subfamily of flies

The Cuterebrinae, the robust bot flies, are a subfamily of Oestridae which includes large, parasitic flies; this group has historically been treated as a family, but all recent classifications place them firmly within the Oestridae. Both genera spend their larval stages in the skin of mammals. The genus Cuterebra, or rodent bots, attack rodents and similar animals. The other genus, Dermatobia, attacks primates, including humans.

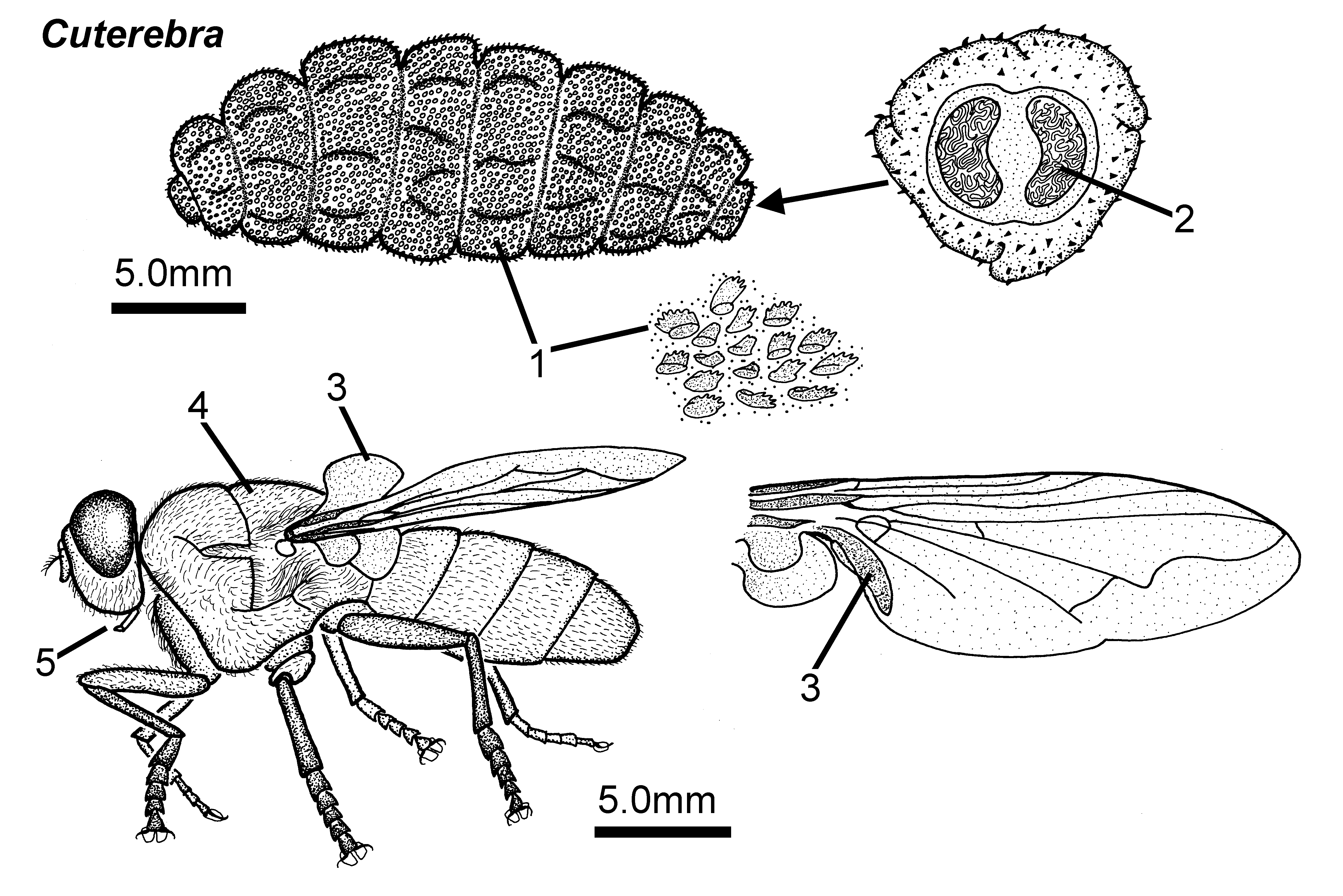
Cuterebra larva and adult

== See also ==
- Cuterebriasis
