= Cuterebra cochisei =

Scientific classification
- Kingdom: Animalia
- Phylum: Arthropoda
- Class: Insecta
- Order: Diptera
- Family: Oestridae
- Genus: Cuterebra
- Species: C. cochisei

Binomial name
- Cuterebra cochisei Sabrosky, 1986

Species of fly

Cuterebra cochisei is a species of new world skin bot fly in the family Oestridae.
