= Cuterebra lepivora =

Scientific classification
- Kingdom: Animalia
- Phylum: Arthropoda
- Class: Insecta
- Order: Diptera
- Family: Oestridae
- Genus: Cuterebra
- Species: C. lepivora

Binomial name
- Cuterebra lepivora Coquillett, 1898

Synonyms
- Cuterebra aldrichi Austen, 1933

Species of fly

Cuterebra lepivora is a species of new world skin bot fly in the family Oestridae. Its larvae are usually parasites of cottontail rabbits. Adult males can be territorial.
