= Cuterebra buccata =

Scientific classification
- Kingdom: Animalia
- Phylum: Arthropoda
- Class: Insecta
- Order: Diptera
- Family: Oestridae
- Genus: Cuterebra
- Species: C. buccata

Binomial name
- Cuterebra buccata (Fabricius, 1776)

Synonyms
- Bogeria scudderi Townsend, 1917; Cuterebra purivora Clark, 1815; Oestrus buccata Fabricius, 1776

Species of fly

Cuterebra buccata, the rabbit bot fly, is a species of new world skin bot fly in the family Oestridae.
