= Cuterebriasis =

Parasitic disease

Cuterebriasis is a parasitic disease affecting rodents, lagomorphs (hares, rabbits, pikas), felines, and canines. The etiologic agent is the larval development of botflies within the Cuterebra or Trypoderma genera, which occurs obligatorily in rodents and lagomorphs, respectively. Felines and canines serve as accidental hosts, but research suggests only by Trypoderma spp. Entrance into the body by first-instar larvae occurs via mucous membranes of natural orifices or open wounds as opposed to direct dermic penetration.

== Clinical signs ==
In rabbits, hares, and lagomorphs, clinical signs usually do not appear. Subcutaneous cysts, warbles, may present upon larval deposition out of the body at maturation. Three forms in which cuterebriasis may present in canines and felines:

- Myasis involves subcutaneous cyst formation due to third larval-instar maturation, occurring about 30 days after entry into the body. Cysts are often found on the face, neck, and trunk, but location varies with larval migration within the host. Serous discharge may be observed from these cysts, which are typically 3-5 mm in diameter and include a central pore through which the larvae respire. This pore also serves as a means of exit for the larvae, which occurs between 3 and 8 weeks after entry.
- Cerebrospinal cuterebriasis results from larval migration to the brain. This is seen in cats, and is the proposed cause for feline ischemic encephalopathy and a suggestive causative agent of feline idiopathic vestibular disease. Symptoms of this type of presentation include lethargy, seizures, blindness, abnormal vocalization or gait, circling, and abnormal or no reflex responses. When affecting the central nervous system, cats are known to exhibit violent sneezing attacks that can begin weeks prior to manifestation of other clinical signs.
- Respiratory disease results when larval migration occurs through the trachea, pharynx, diaphragm, or lungs. Cuterebriasis has been increasingly noted as a cause for dyspnea in felines.

== Diagnosis ==
Definitive diagnosis can only occur with positive identification of the larvae. This involves radiologic imaging (preferably MRI, which can reveal larval migration tracks and in some cases the larvae themselves), as well as surgical exploration during which larvae can be removed and examined for identification. Identification of exact species is often impossible, as the instars of the various Cuterebra and Trychoderma spp. exhibit significant resemblance, but identification as a Cuterebra botfly is sufficient for diagnosis as cuterebriasis. Typically, a third larval-instar is found and identifiable by its dark, thick, heavily spined body.

== Treatment ==
Subcutaneous cysts may be surgically opened to remove less-mature bots. If matured, cysts may be opened and Cuterebra may be removed using mosquito forceps. Covering the pore in petroleum jelly may aid in removal. If larvae are discovered within body tissues, rather than subcutaneously, surgical removal is the only means of treatment. Ivermectin may be administered with corticosteroids to halt larval migration in cats presenting with respiratory cuterebriasis, but this is not approved for use in cats. A cure for cerebrospinal cuterebriasis has not been reported.
