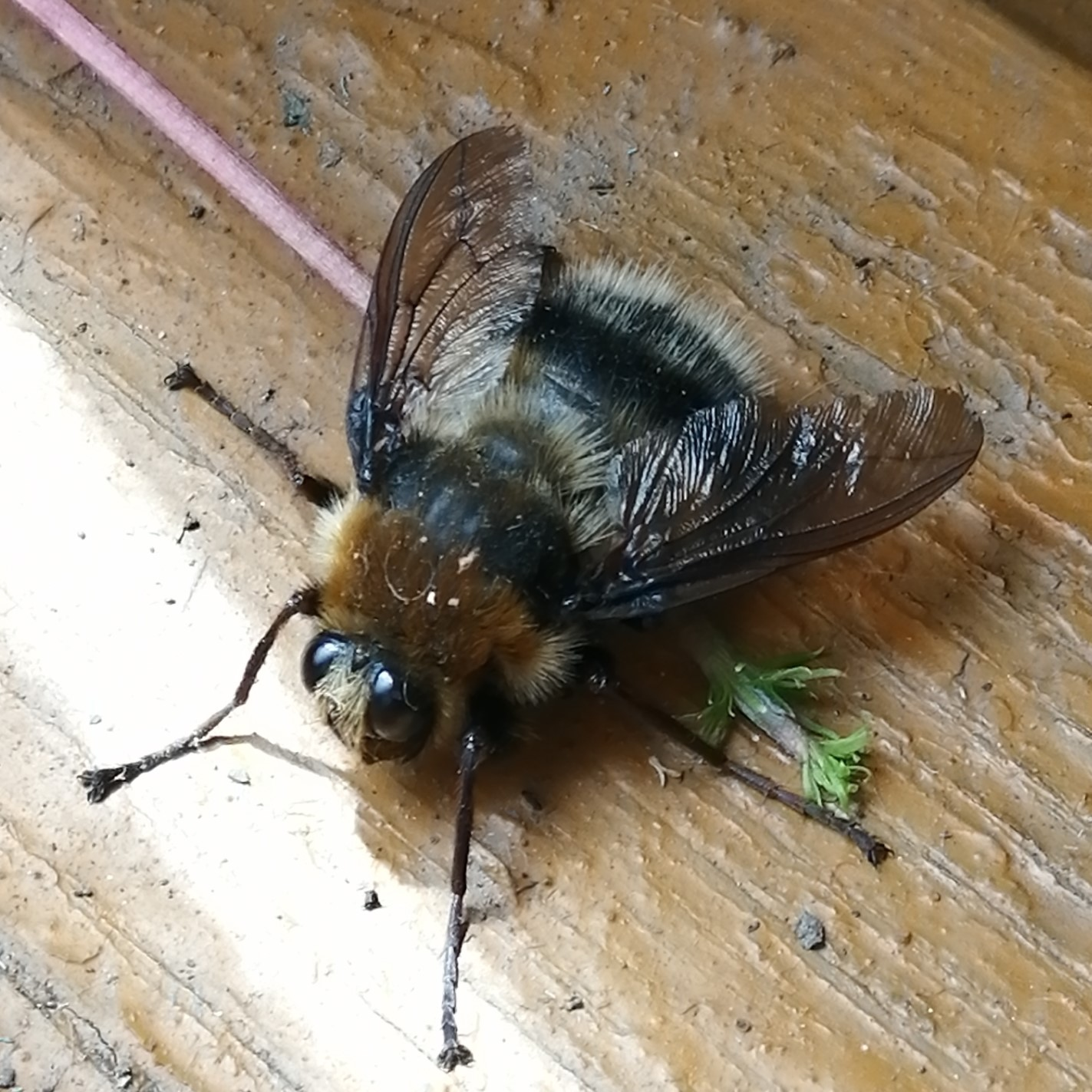

Scientific classification
- Kingdom: Animalia
- Phylum: Arthropoda
- Clade: Pancrustacea
- Class: Insecta
- Order: Diptera
- Family: Oestridae
- Genus: Portschinskia; Semenov, 1902

Synonyms
- Schnablia Bezzi, 1906

= Portschinskia =

Genus of flies

Portschinskia is a genus of flies. They are also known as bumblebee bot flies due to their striking resemblance to bumblebees both in habit and colour patterns. Like all bot flies they are obligate parasites whose larvae develop in mammals.

== Taxonomy ==
The first phylogenetic study of Portschinskia of all 11 species, including four new species, was published in 2020.

- Portschinskia bombiformis Portschinsky, 1901
- Portschinskia burmensis Xin-Yu Li, Thomas Pape, Dong Zhang, 2020
- Portschinskia gigas Portschinsky, 1901
- Portschinskia himalayana Grunin, 1962
- Portschinskia loewii Schnabl, 1877
- Portschinskia magnifica Pleske, 1926
- Portschinskia neugebaueri Portschinsky, 1881
- Portschinskia przewalskyi Portschinsky, 1887
- Portschinskia sichuanensis Xin-Yu Li, Thomas Pape, Dong Zhang, 2020
- Portschinskia xizangensis Xin-Yu Li, Thomas Pape, Dong Zhang, 2020
- Portschinskia yunnanensis Xin-Yu Li, Thomas Pape, Dong Zhang, 2020

== See also ==
- Botfly
