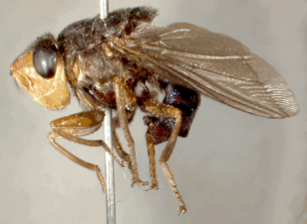
- Adult female human botfly

Scientific classification
- Kingdom: Animalia
- Phylum: Arthropoda
- Clade: Pancrustacea
- Class: Insecta
- Order: Diptera
- Family: Oestridae
- Subfamily: Cuterebrinae
- Genus: Dermatobia
- Species: D. hominis

Binomial name
- Dermatobia hominis (Linnaeus Jr. in Pallas, 1781)

Synonyms
- Oestrus hominis (Linnaeus Jr. in Pallas, 1781)

= Dermatobia hominis =

Species of fly

The human botfly, Dermatobia hominis (Greek δέρμα, skin + βίος, life, and Latin hominis, of a human), is a species of botfly whose larvae parasitise humans (in addition to a wide range of other animals, including other primates). It is also known as the torsalo or American warble fly, though the warble fly is in the genus Hypoderma and not Dermatobia, and is a parasite on cattle and deer instead of humans.

Dermatobia fly eggs have been shown to be vectored by over 40 species of mosquitoes and muscoid flies, as well as one species of tick (however, the source for this is somewhat old — 2007 — and slightly more recent literature seems to indicate they don't need a particular species of tick, or at least makes no mention of them only being able to use one as a vector). The female captures the mosquito and attaches its eggs to its body, then releases it. Either the eggs hatch while the mosquito is feeding and the larvae use the mosquito bite area as the entry point, or the eggs simply drop off the muscoid fly when it lands on the skin. The larvae develop inside the subcutaneous layers, and after about eight weeks, they drop out to pupate for at least a week, typically in the soil. The adults are large flies lacking mouthparts (as is true of other oestrid flies).

This species is native to the Americas from southeastern Mexico (beginning in central Veracruz) to northern Argentina, and Uruguay, though it is not abundant enough (nor harmful enough) to ever attain true pest status. Normally the greatest risk they pose to humans is increasing the chances of infection. Since the fly larvae can survive the entire eight-week development only if the wound does not become infected, patients rarely experience infections unless they kill the larva without removing it completely.

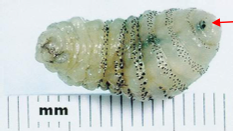
Extracted human botfly larva: The arrow points to the larva's mouthparts.

== Remedies ==
The easiest and most effective way to remove botfly larvae is to apply petroleum jelly over the location, which prevents air from reaching the larva, suffocating it. It can then be removed with tweezers safely after a day.

Venom extractor syringes can remove larvae with ease at any stage of growth. A larva has also been successfully removed by first applying several coats of nail polish to the area of the larva's entrance, weakening it by partial asphyxiation. Covering the location with adhesive tape would also result in partial asphyxiation and weakening of the larva, but is not recommended because the larva's breathing tube is fragile and would be broken during the removal of the tape, leaving most of the larva behind.

Oral use of ivermectin, an antiparasitic avermectin medicine, has proven to be an effective and noninvasive treatment that leads to the spontaneous emigration of the larva. This is especially important for cases where the larva is located in inaccessible places such as inside the inner canthus of the eye.

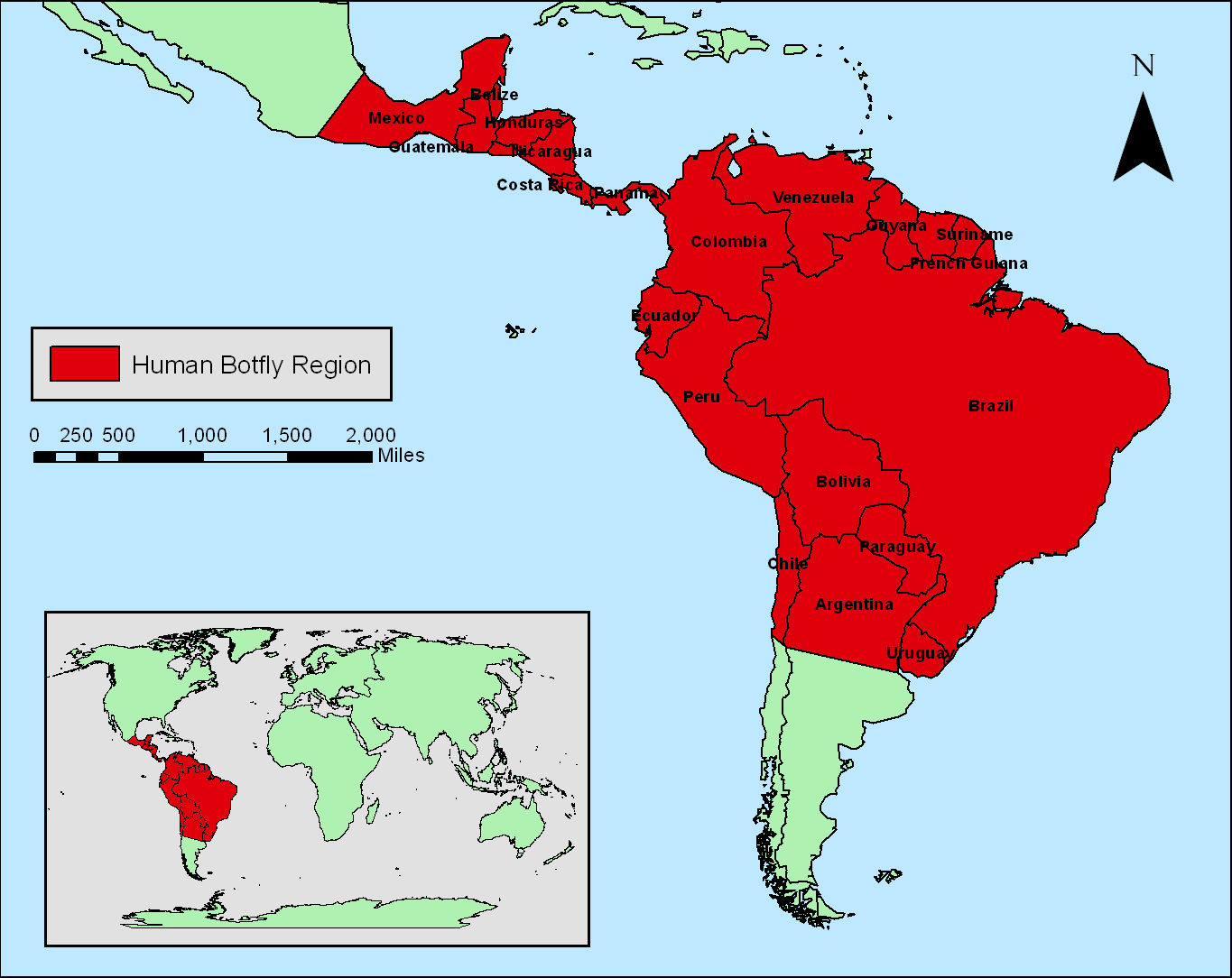
Map of human botfly region

== See also ==
- Botfly
- Cochliomyia hominivorax
- Cordylobia anthropophaga
- Human parasite
- List of parasites of humans
- Myiasis
