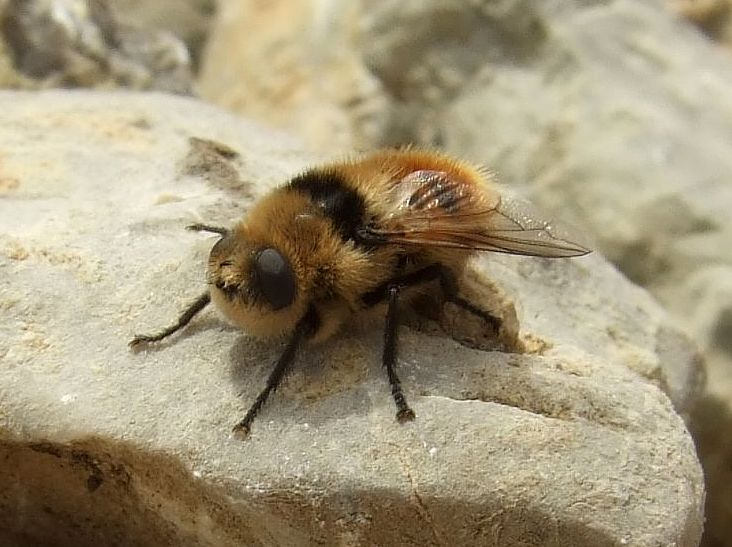
- Deer botfly (Cephenemyia stimulator)

Scientific classification
- Kingdom: Animalia
- Phylum: Arthropoda
- Clade: Pancrustacea
- Class: Insecta
- Order: Diptera
- Clade: Eremoneura
- Clade: Cyclorrhapha
- Section: Schizophora
- Subsection: Calyptratae
- Superfamily: Oestroidea
- Family: Oestridae; Leach, 1815

Subfamilies
- Cuterebrinae; Gasterophilinae; Hypodermatinae; Oestrinae

= Botfly =

Parasitic insect

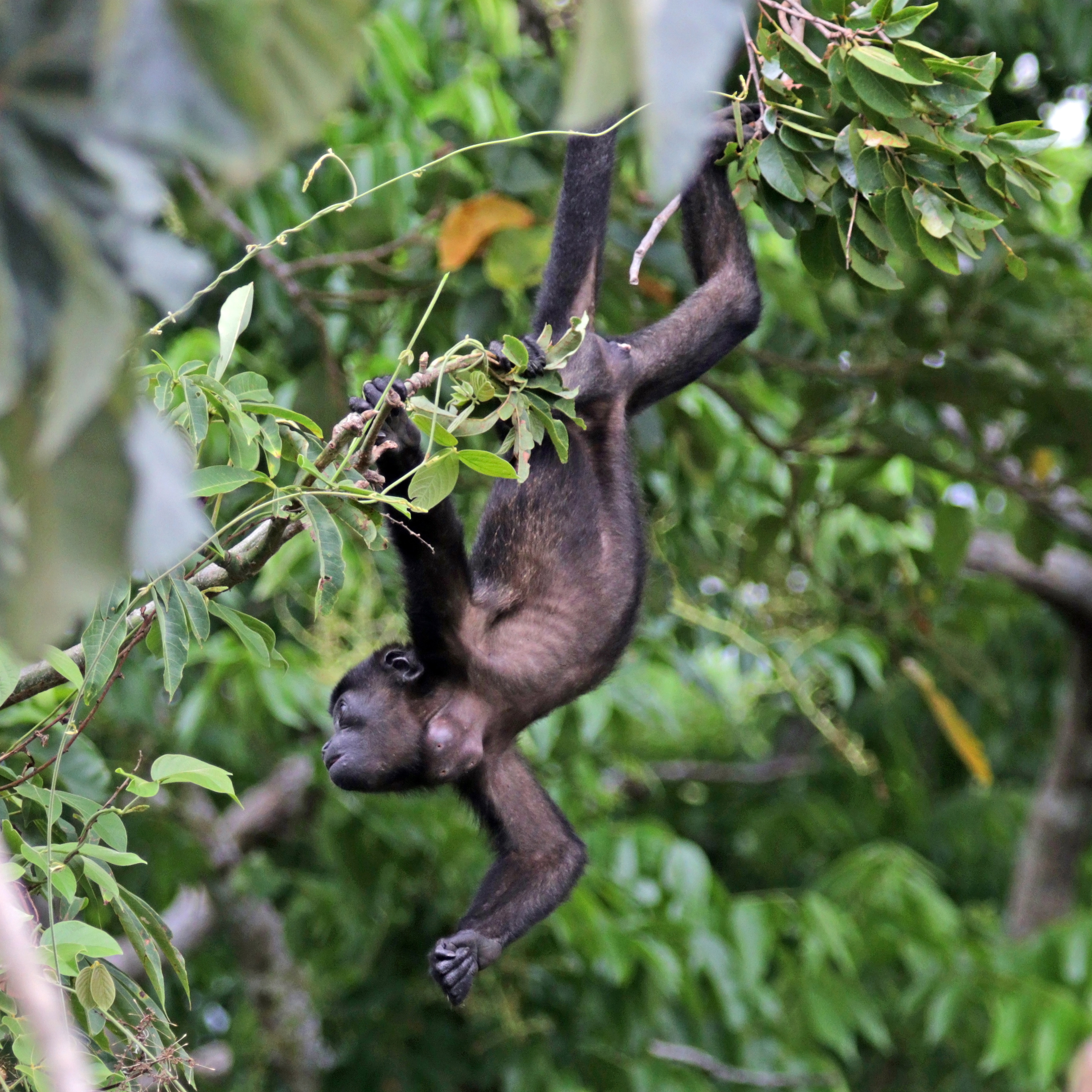
Juvenile male Ecuadorian mantled howler (Alouatta palliata aequatorialis) with botfly parasites

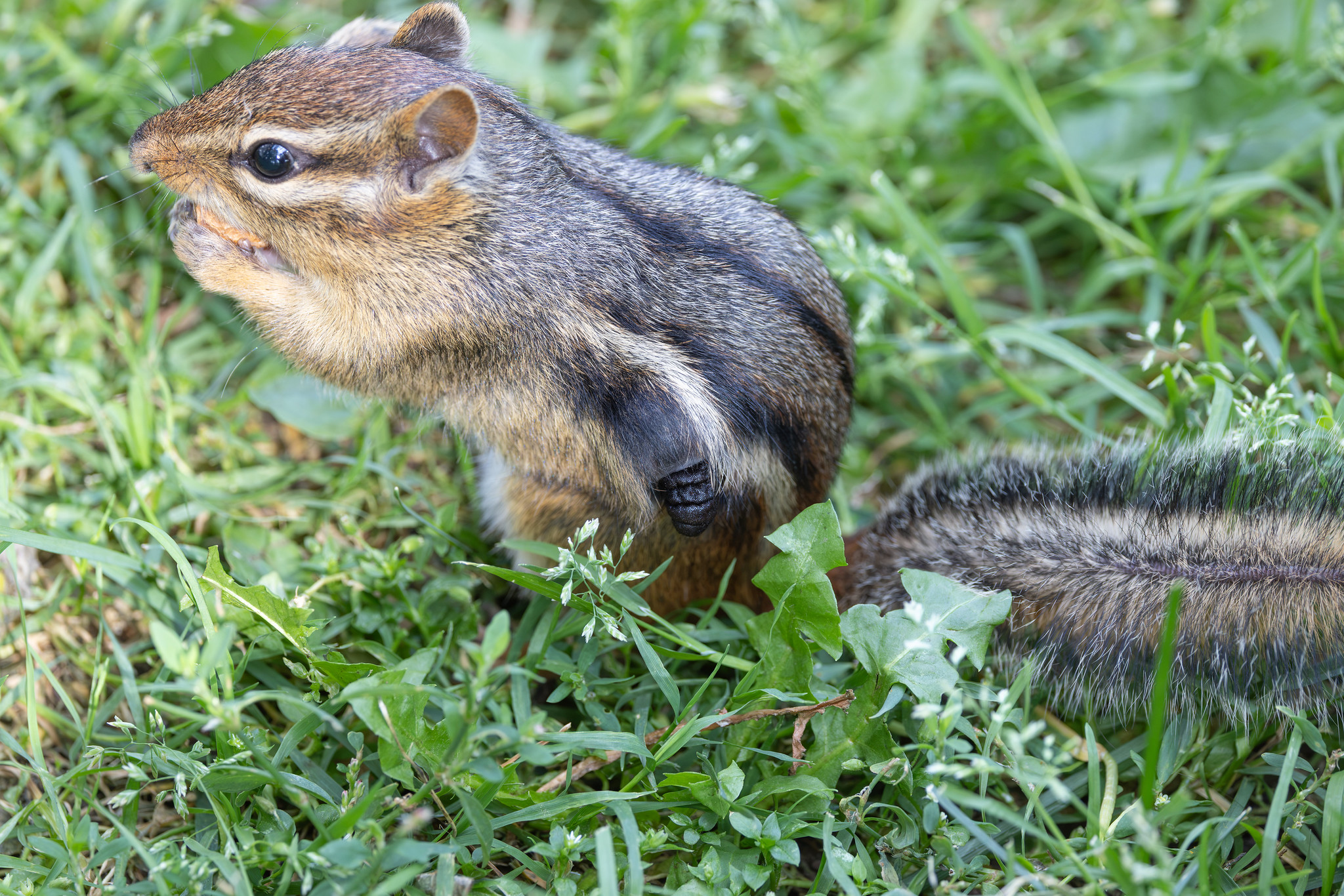
Squirrel botfly (Cuterebra emasculator) emerging from an eastern chipmunk.

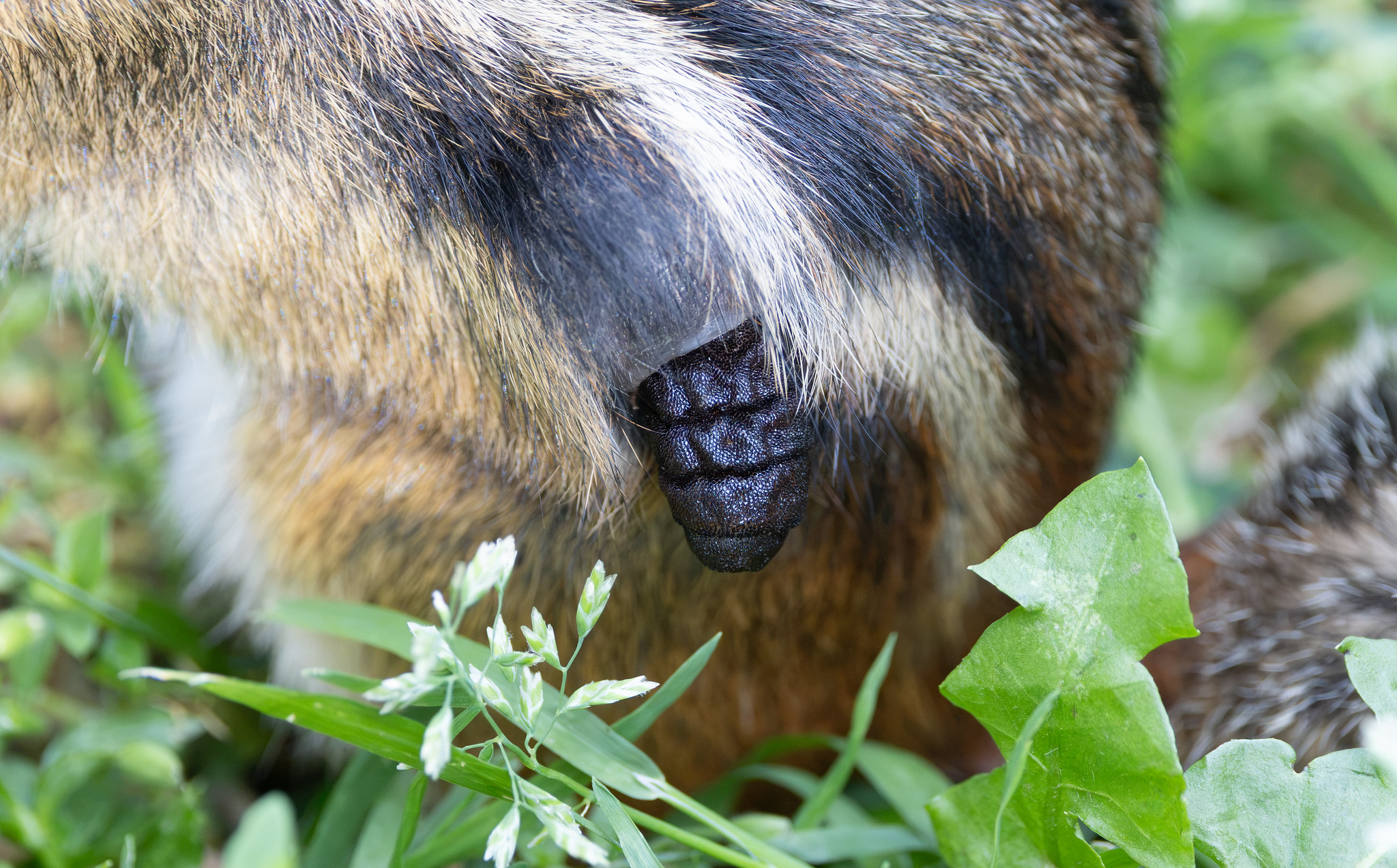
Squirrel botfly (Cuterebra emasculator) emerging from an eastern chipmunk. (Closeup)

Botflies, also known as warble flies, heel flies, and gadflies, are flies of the family Oestridae. Their larvae are internal parasites of mammals, some species growing in the host's flesh and others within the gut. Dermatobia hominis is the only species of botfly known to parasitize humans routinely, though other species of flies cause myiasis in humans.

== General ==
A botfly, also written bot fly, bott fly or bot-fly in various combinations, is any fly in the family Oestridae. Their life cycles vary greatly according to species, but the larvae of all species are internal parasites of mammals. Largely according to species, they also are known variously as warble flies, heel flies, and gadflies. The larvae of some species grow in the flesh of their hosts, while others grow within the hosts' alimentary tracts.

The word "bot" in this sense means a maggot. A warble is a skin lump or callus such as might be caused by an ill-fitting harness, or by the presence of a warble fly maggot under the skin. The human botfly, Dermatobia hominis, is the only species of botfly whose larvae ordinarily parasitise humans, though flies in some other families episodically cause human myiasis and are sometimes more harmful.

== Family Oestridae ==
The Oestridae now are generally defined as including the former families Oestridae, Cuterebridae, Gasterophilidae, and Hypodermatidae as subfamilies.

The Oestridae, in turn, are a family within the superfamily Oestroidea, together with the families Calliphoridae, Mesembrinellidae, Mystacinobiidae, Polleniidae, Rhiniidae, Rhinophoridae, Sarcophagidae, Tachinidae, and Ulurumyiidae.

Of families of flies causing myiasis, the Oestridae include the highest proportion of species whose larvae live as obligate parasites within the bodies of mammals. Roughly 150 species are known worldwide. Most other species of flies implicated in myiasis are members of related families, such as blow-flies.

== Infestation ==
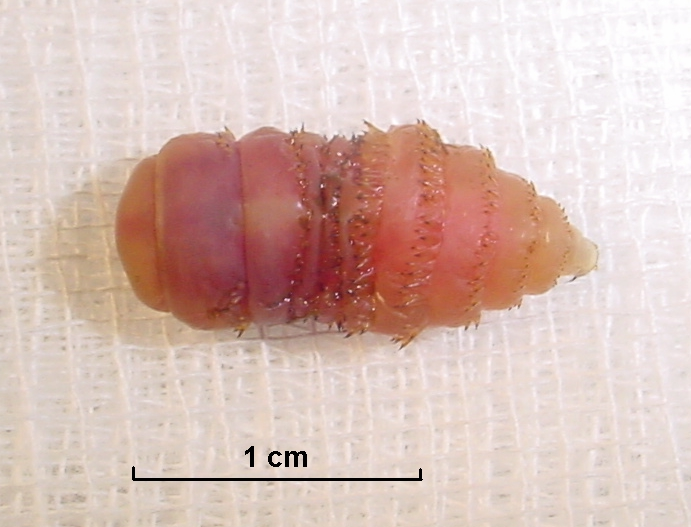
Larval stage of Gasterophilus intestinalis

Botflies deposit eggs on a host, or sometimes use an intermediate vector such as the common housefly, mosquitoes, and, in the case of D. hominis, a species of tick. After mating, the female botfly captures the phoretic insect by holding onto its wings with her legs. She then makes the slip—attaching 15 to 30 eggs onto the insect or arachnid's abdomen, where they incubate. The fertilized female does this over and over again to distribute the 100 to 400 eggs she produces in her short adult stage of life of only 8–9 days. Larvae from these eggs, stimulated by the warmth and proximity of a large mammal host, drop onto its skin and burrow underneath. Intermediate vectors are often used since many animal hosts recognize the approach of a botfly and flee.

Eggs are deposited on larger animals' skin directly, or the larvae hatch and drop from the eggs attached to the intermediate vector; the body heat of the host animal induces hatching upon contact or immediate proximity. Some forms of botfly also occur in the digestive tract after ingestion by licking.

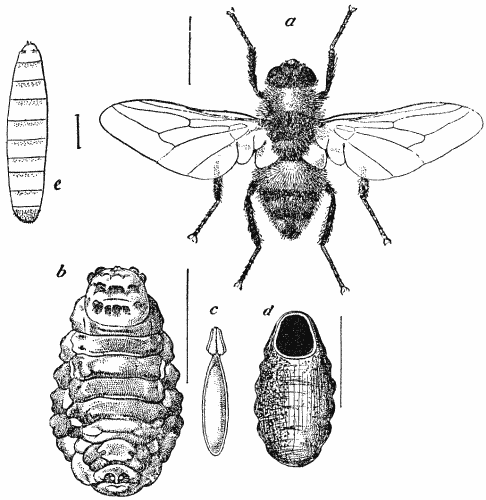
Ox warble fly (Hypoderma bovis)

Myiasis can be caused by larvae burrowing into the skin (or tissue lining) of the host animal. Mature larvae drop from the host and complete the pupal stage in the soil. They do not kill the host animal, thus they are true parasites.

The equine botflies present seasonal difficulties to equestrian caretakers, as they lay eggs on the insides of horses' front legs on the cannon or metacarpal bone (below the knee) and knees, and sometimes on the throat or nose depending on the species. These eggs, which look like small, yellow drops of paint, must be carefully removed during the laying season (late summer and early fall) to prevent infestation in the horse. When a horse rubs its nose on its legs, the eggs are transferred to the mouth and from there to the intestines, where the larvae grow and attach themselves to the stomach lining or the small intestine. The attachment of the larvae to the tissue produces a mild irritation, which results in erosions and ulcerations at the site. Removal of the eggs (which adhere to the host's hair) is difficult since the bone and tendons are directly under the skin on the cannon bones; eggs must be removed with a sharp knife (often a razor blade) or rough sandpaper and caught before they reach the ground. The larvae remain attached and develop for 10–12 months before they are passed out in the feces. Occasionally, horse owners report seeing botfly larvae in horse manure. These larvae are cylindrical and are reddish-orange. In one to two months, adult botflies emerge from the developing larvae and the cycle repeats itself. Botflies can be controlled with several types of dewormers, including dichlorvos, ivermectin, and trichlorfon.

In cattle, the lesions caused by these flies can become infected by Mannheimia granulomatis, a bacterium that causes lechiguana, characterized by rapid-growing, hard lumps beneath the skin of the animal. Without antibiotics, an affected animal will die within 3–11 months.

Cuterebra fontinella, the mouse botfly, parasitizes small mammals all around North America.

Dermatobia hominis, the human botfly, occasionally uses humans to host its larvae.

== As human food ==
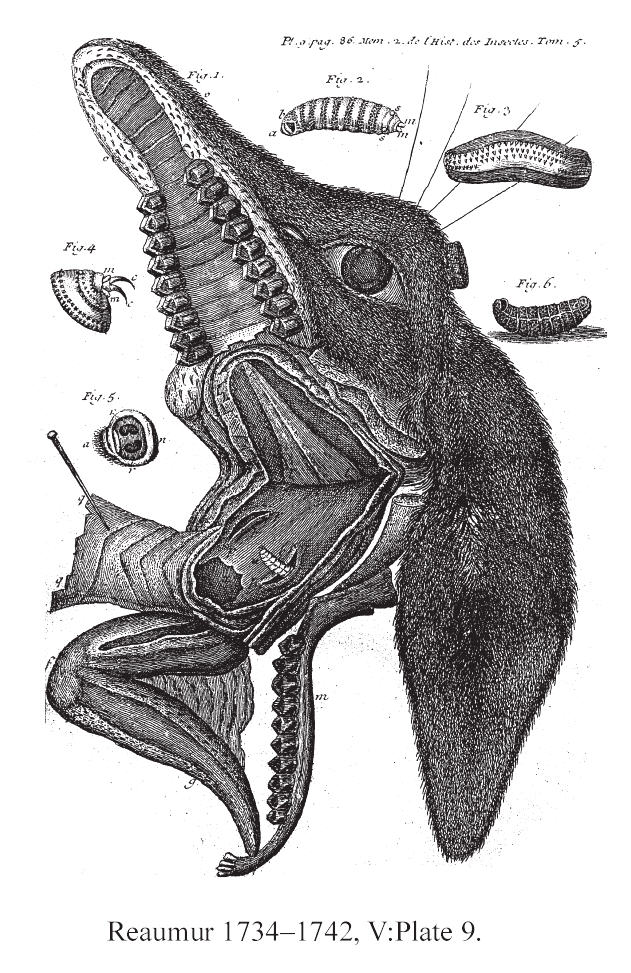
Dissected head of a deer showing botfly larvae

In cold climates supporting reindeer or caribou-reliant populations, large quantities of Hypoderma tarandi (caribou warble fly) maggots are available to human populations during the butchery of animals.

The sixth episode of season one of the television series Beyond Survival, titled "The Inuit – Survivors of the Future", features survival expert Les Stroud and two Inuit guides hunting caribou on the northern coast of Baffin Island near Pond Inlet, Nunavut, Canada. Upon skinning and butchering of one of the animals, numerous larvae (presumably H. tarandi, although not explicitly stated) are apparent on the inside of the caribou pelt. Stroud and his two Inuit guides eat (albeit somewhat reluctantly) one larva each, with Stroud commenting that the larva "tastes like milk" and was historically commonly consumed by the Inuit.

Copious art dating back to the Pleistocene in Europe confirms their consumption in premodern times, as well.

The Babylonian Talmud Hullin 67b discusses whether the warble fly is kosher.

== See also ==
- Cochliomyia hominivorax, the screwworm
- Cordylobia anthropophaga, the tumbu fly
- Philornis, a genus of flies that are subcutaneous parasites of birds, sometimes referred to as "bot flies"
