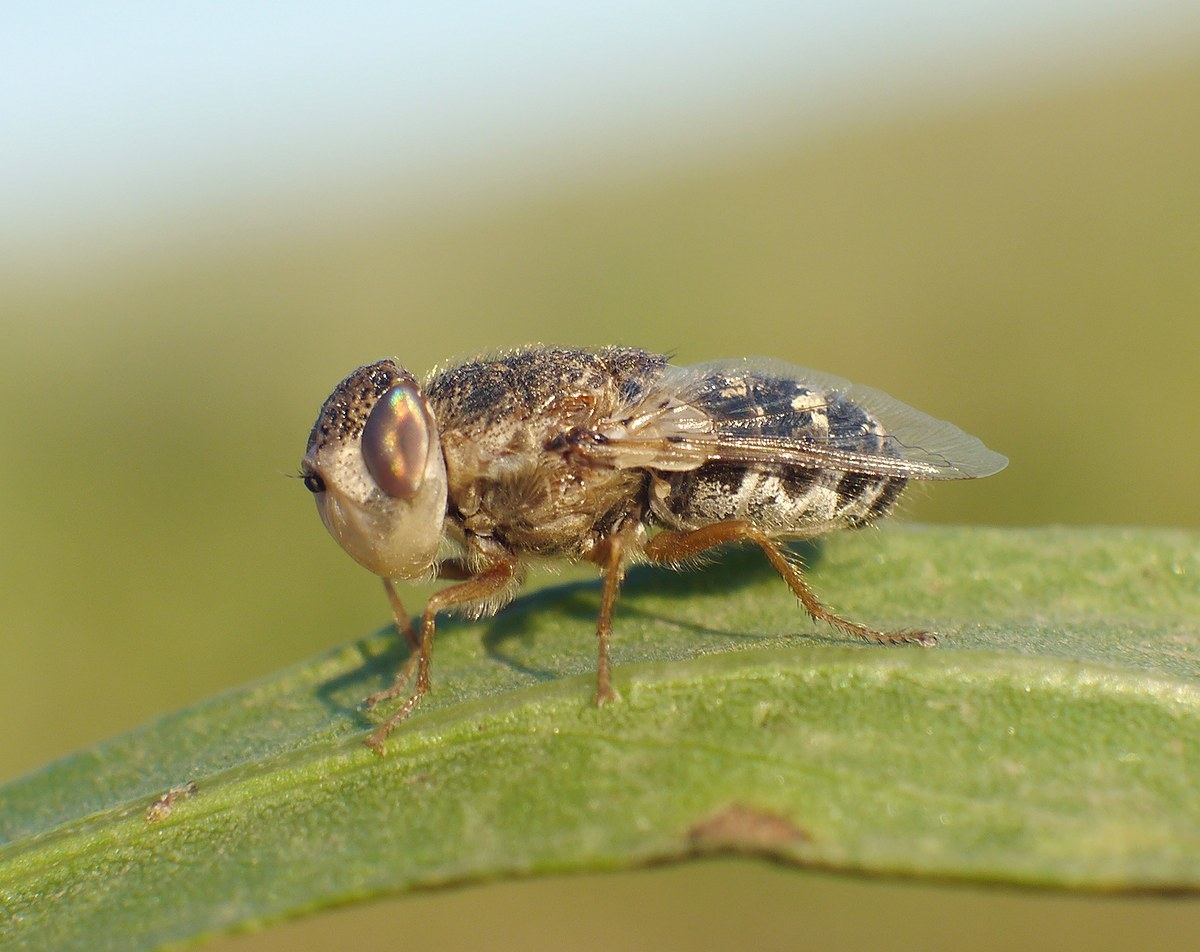
- Oestrus ovis, Ukraine

Scientific classification
- Kingdom: Animalia
- Phylum: Arthropoda
- Clade: Pancrustacea
- Class: Insecta
- Order: Diptera
- Family: Oestridae
- Subfamily: Oestrinae
- Genus: Oestrus; Linnaeus, 1758

Type species
- Oestrus ovis Linnaeus, 1758

Synonyms
- Aestrus Lioy, 1865; Cephalemya Rondani, 1856; Cephalomyia Agassiz, 1846; Coephalomyia Rondani, 1868; Estrus Lioy, 1865; Gastromysa Rondani, 1857; Oestreus Radermacher, 1779

= Oestrus (fly) =

Genus of flies

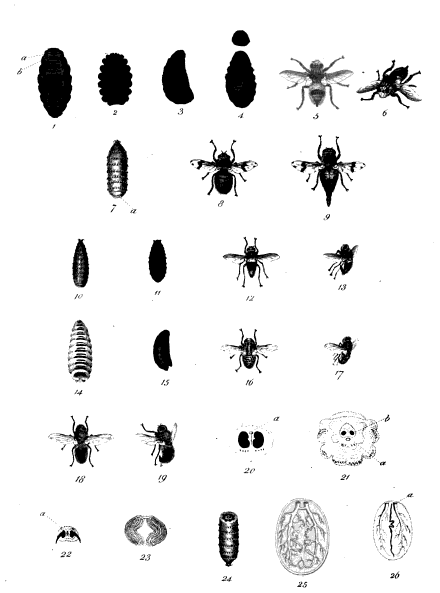
image_caption = Illustrations in a 1797 paper by Bracy Clark

Oestrus is a genus of bot flies, from the family Oestridae

The genus includes the sheep bot fly (O. ovis Linnaeus, 1758) that is a major pest of the sheep industry worldwide.

== Species ==
These 12 species belong to the genus Oestrus:

- Oestrus aureoargentatus Rodhain & Bequaert, 1912
- Oestrus caucasicus Grunin, 1948
- Oestrus cervi Schrank, 1803
- Oestrus colombaschensis Scopoli, 1780
- Oestrus curvicauda White, 1789
- Oestrus dubitatus Basson & Zumpt, 1969
- Oestrus fasciculosus Gmelin, 1790
- Oestrus gvozdevi Grunin, 1950
- Oestrus macdonaldi Gedoelst, 1912
- Oestrus ovis Linnaeus, 1758 (sheep bot fly)
- Oestrus spec Linnaeus, 1758
- Oestrus variolosus Loew, 1863
