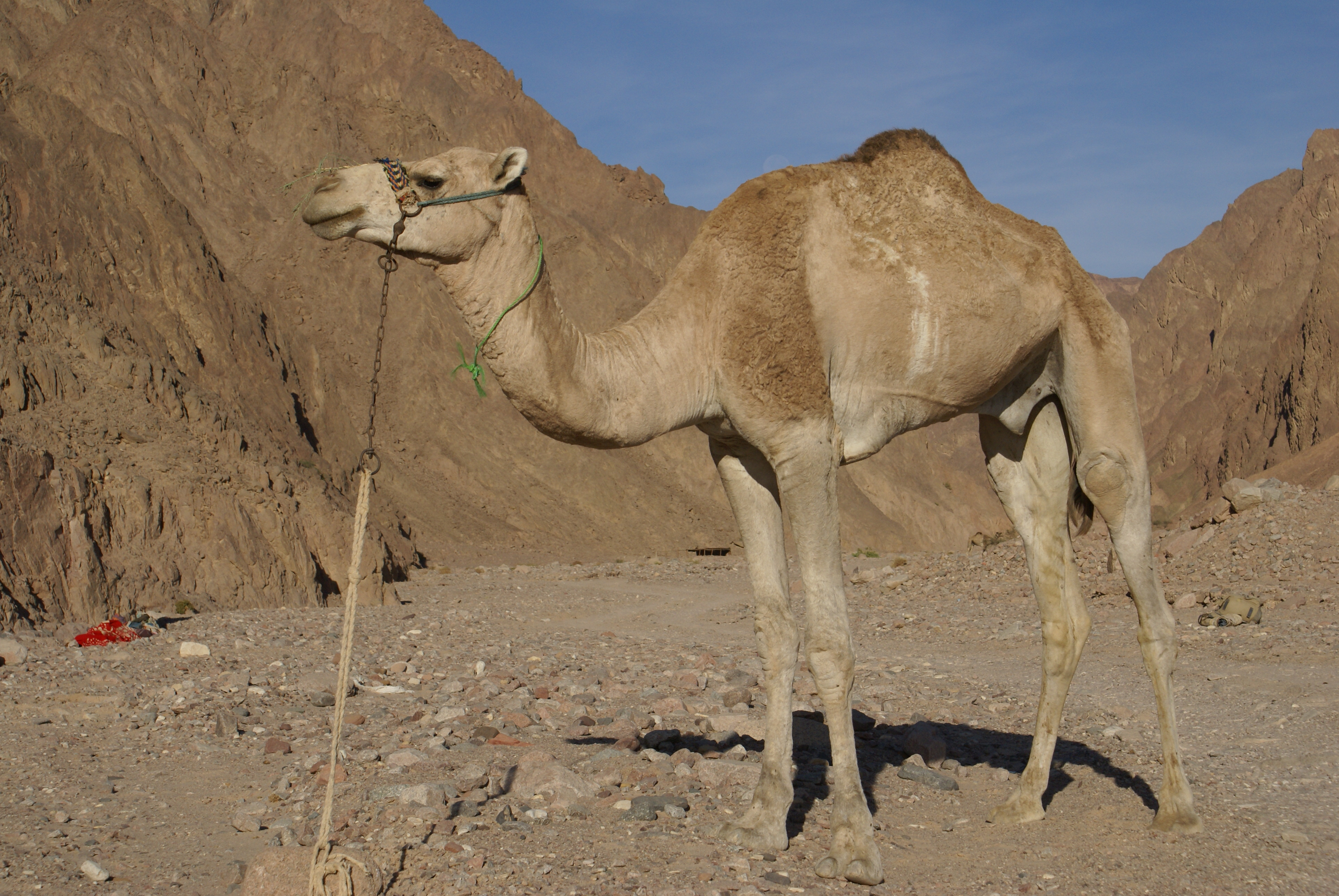
- Dromedary in a wadi on the Sinai Peninsula, Egypt

Conservation status
- Domesticated

Scientific classification
- Kingdom: Animalia
- Phylum: Chordata
- Class: Mammalia
- Order: Artiodactyla
- Family: Camelidae
- Genus: Camelus
- Species: C. dromedarius

Binomial name
- Camelus dromedarius Linnaeus, 1758

Synonyms
- List: C. aegyptiacus Kolenati, 1847; C. africanus (Gloger, 1841); C. arabicus Desmoulins, 1823; C. dromas Pallas, 1811; C. dromos Kerr, 1792; C. ferus Falk,1786; C. lukius Kolenati, 1847; C. polytrichus Kolenati, 1847; C. turcomanichus J. Fischer, 1829; C. vulgaris Kolenati, 1847

Audio

= Dromedary =

One-humped camel

The dromedary (Camelus dromedarius), also known as the dromedary camel, Arabian camel and one-humped camel, is a large camel of the genus Camelus with one hump on its back. It is the tallest of the three camel species; adult males stand 1.8–2.4 m (5.9–7.9 ft) at the shoulder, while females are 1.7–1.9 m (5.6–6.2 ft) tall. Males typically weigh between 400 and 690 kg (880 and 1,520 lb), and females weigh between 300 and 540 kg (660 and 1,190 lb). The dromedary's distinctive features include its long, curved neck, narrow chest, a single hump, and long hairs on the throat, shoulders, and hump. The coat is generally a shade of brown. The hump is 20 cm (7.9 in) tall or more, and is made of fat bound together by fibrous tissue.

The dromedary feeds on foliage and desert vegetation; several adaptations, such as the ability to tolerate losing more than 30% of its total water content, allow it to thrive in its desert habitat. Mating occurs annually and peaks in the rainy season; females bear a single calf after a gestation of 15 months. It is mainly active during daylight hours and forms herds of about 20 individuals, which are led by a dominant male.

The dromedary has not occurred naturally in the wild for nearly 2,000 years. It was probably first domesticated in the Arabian Peninsula about 4,000 years ago. In the wild, the dromedary inhabited arid regions, including the Sahara. The domesticated dromedary is kept in the semiarid to arid regions of the Old World, mainly in Africa, the Arabian Peninsula and the Thar Desert in Pakistan and India. A feral population occurs in Australia. Products of the dromedary, including its meat and milk, support several North African tribes; it is also commonly used for riding and as a pack animal.

== Etymology ==
The common name "dromedary" comes from the Old French dromedaire or the Late Latin dromedarius. These originated from the Greek word dromas, δρομάς (ο, η) (GEN (γενική) dromados, δρομάδος), meaning "running" or "runner", used in Greek in the combination δρομάς κάμηλος (dromas kamelos), literally "running camel", to refer to the dromedary. The first recorded use in English of the name "dromedary" occurred in the 14th century. The dromedary possibly originated in Arabia or Somalia, so is sometimes referred to as the Arabian or East African camel. The word "camel" generally refers either to the dromedary or the congeneric Bactrian; the word came into English via Old Norman, from the Latin word camēlus, from Ancient Greek κάμηλος (kámēlos), ultimately from a Semitic source akin to Hebrew גמל (gamál) and Arabic جمل (jamal).

== Taxonomy and classification ==
Phylogenetic relationships of the dromedary compared to living and recently extinct camels

- Camelidae
  - Lamini (llamas)
  - Camelini
    - †Camelops
    - Camelus
      - Camelus dromedarius (dromedary)
      - - †Camelus knoblochi
        - Camelus ferus (wild Bactrian camel)
        - Camelus bactrianus (domestic Bactrian camel)

The dromedary shares the genus Camelus with the Bactrian camel (C. bactrianus) and the wild Bactrian camel (C. ferus). The dromedary belongs to the family Camelidae. Ancient Greek philosopher Aristotle (fourth century BC) was the first to describe the species of Camelus. He named two species in his History of Animals; the one-humped Arabian camel and the two-humped Bactrian camel. The dromedary was given its current binomial name Camelus dromedarius by Swedish zoologist Carl Linnaeus in his 1758 publication Systema Naturae. In 1927, British veterinarian Arnold Leese classified dromedaries by their basic habitats; the hill camels are small, muscular animals and efficient beasts of burden; the larger plains camels could be further divided into the desert type that can bear light burdens and are apt for riding, and the riverine type – slow animals that can bear heavy burdens; and those intermediate between these two types.

In 2007, Peng Cui of the Chinese Academy of Sciences and colleagues carried out a phylogenetic study of the evolutionary relationships between the two tribes of Camelidae; Camelini – consisting of the three Camelus species (the study considered the wild Bactrian camel as a subspecies of the Bactrian camel) – and Lamini, which consists of the alpaca (Vicugna pacos), the guanaco (Lama guanicoe), the llama (L. glama), and the vicuña (V. vicugna). The study showed the two tribes had diverged 25 million years ago (early Miocene), earlier than previously estimated from North American fossils.

The dromedary and the Bactrian camels often interbreed to produce fertile offspring. Where the ranges of the species overlap, such as in northern Punjab, Persia, and Afghanistan, the phenotypic differences between them tend to decrease as a result of extensive crossbreeding. The fertility of their hybrid has given rise to speculation that the dromedary and the Bactrian camel should be merged into a single species with two varieties. However, a 1994 analysis of the mitochondrial cytochrome b gene showed the species display 10.3% divergence in their sequences.

== Genetics and hybrids ==
The dromedary has 74 diploid chromosomes, the same as other camelids. The autosomes consist of five pairs of small to medium-sized metacentrics and submetacentrics. The X chromosome is the largest in the metacentric and submetacentric group. There are 31 pairs of acrocentrics. The dromedary's karyotype is similar to that of the Bactrian camel.

Camel hybridization began in the first millennium BC. For about a thousand years, Bactrian camels and dromedaries have been successfully bred in regions where they are sympatric to form hybrids with either a long, slightly lopsided hump or two humps – one small and one large. These hybrids are larger and stronger than their parents – they can bear greater loads. A cross between a first-generation female hybrid and a male Bactrian camel can also produce a hybrid. Hybrids from other combinations tend to be bad-tempered or runts.

== Evolution ==
The extinct Protylopus, which occurred in North America during the upper Eocene, is the oldest and the smallest-known camel. During the transition from Pliocene to Pleistocene, several mammals faced extinction. This period marked the successful radiation of the Camelus species, which migrated over the Bering Strait and dispersed widely into Asia, eastern Europe, and Africa. By the Pleistocene, ancestors of the dromedary occurred in the Middle East and northern Africa.

The modern dromedary probably evolved in the hotter, arid regions of western Asia from the Bactrian camel, which in turn was closely related to the earliest Old World camels. This hypothesis was once thought to be supported by the dromedary foetus having two humps, but modern studies have shown this to be false. A jawbone of a dromedary that dated from 8,200 BC was found in Saudi Arabia on the southern coast of the Red Sea.

In 1975, Richard Bulliet of Columbia University wrote that the dromedary exists in large numbers in areas from which the Bactrian camel has disappeared; the converse is also true to a great extent. He said this substitution could have taken place because of the heavy dependence on the milk, meat, and wool of the dromedary by Syrian and Arabian nomads, while the Asian people domesticated the Bactrian camel, but did not have to depend upon its products.

== Characteristics ==
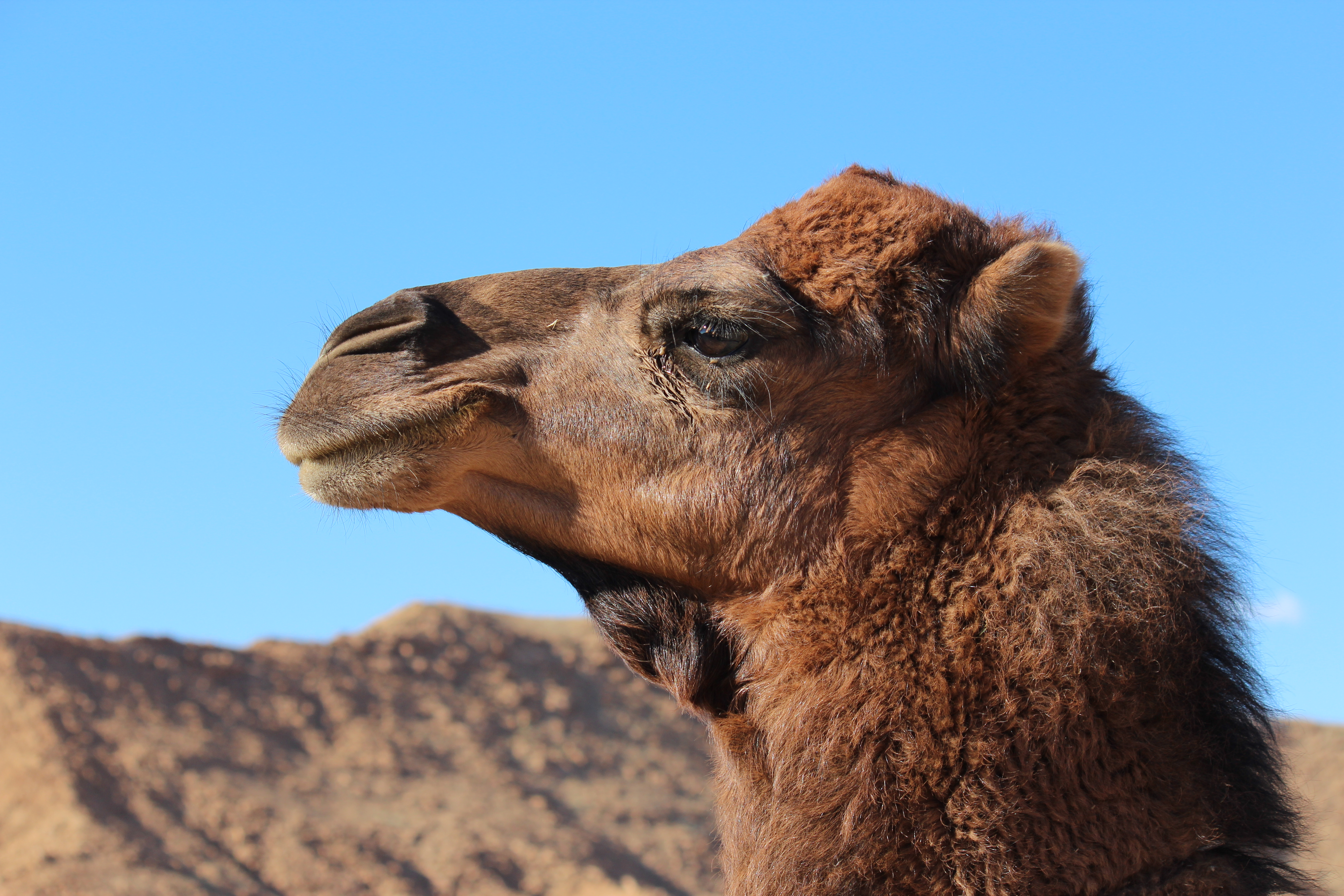
The dromedary has thick, double-layered eyelashes and bushy eyebrows

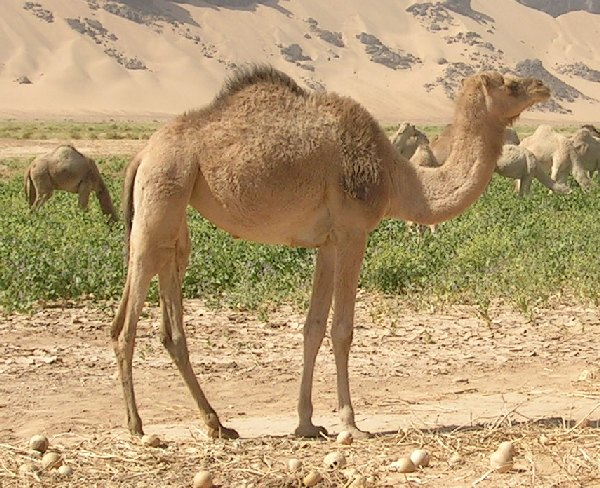
The dromedary has a long curved neck, single hump, and long hair on the throat, shoulders, and hump.

The dromedary is the tallest of the three camel species. Adult males range in height between 1.8 and 2.4 m (5.9 and 7.9 ft) at the shoulder; females range between 1.7 and 1.9 m (5 ft 7 in and 6 ft 3 in). Males typically weigh between 400 and 690 kg (880 and 1,520 lb); females range between 300 and 540 kg (660 and 1,190 lb). The distinctive features are its long, curved neck, narrow chest, and single hump (the Bactrian camel has two), thick, double-layered eyelashes, and bushy eyebrows. They have sharp vision and a good sense of smell. The male has a soft palate (dulaa in Arabic) nearly 18 cm (7.1 in) long, which he inflates to produce a deep pink sac. The palate, which is often mistaken for the tongue, dangles from one side of the mouth and is used to attract females during the mating season.

The coat is generally brown, but can range from black to nearly white. Leese reported piebald dromedaries in Kordofan and Darfur in Sudan. Piebald coloration in some camels is thought to be caused by the KIT^{W1} allele of the KIT gene, though at least one other mutation likely also causes white spotting. The hair is long and concentrated on the throat, shoulders, and hump. The large eyes are protected by prominent supraorbital ridges; the ears are small and rounded. The hump is at least 20 cm (7.9 in) high. The dromedary has long, powerful legs with two toes on each foot. The feet resemble flat, leathery pads. Like the giraffe, dromedaries move both legs on one side of the body at the same time.

Compared with the Bactrian camel, the dromedary has a lighter build, longer limbs, shorter hairs, a harder palate, and an insignificant or absent ethmoidal fissure. Unlike the camelids of the genus Lama, the dromedary has a hump, and in comparison has a longer tail, smaller ears, squarer feet, and a greater height at the shoulder. The dromedary has four teats instead of the two in the Lama species.

=== Anatomy ===
Skeleton

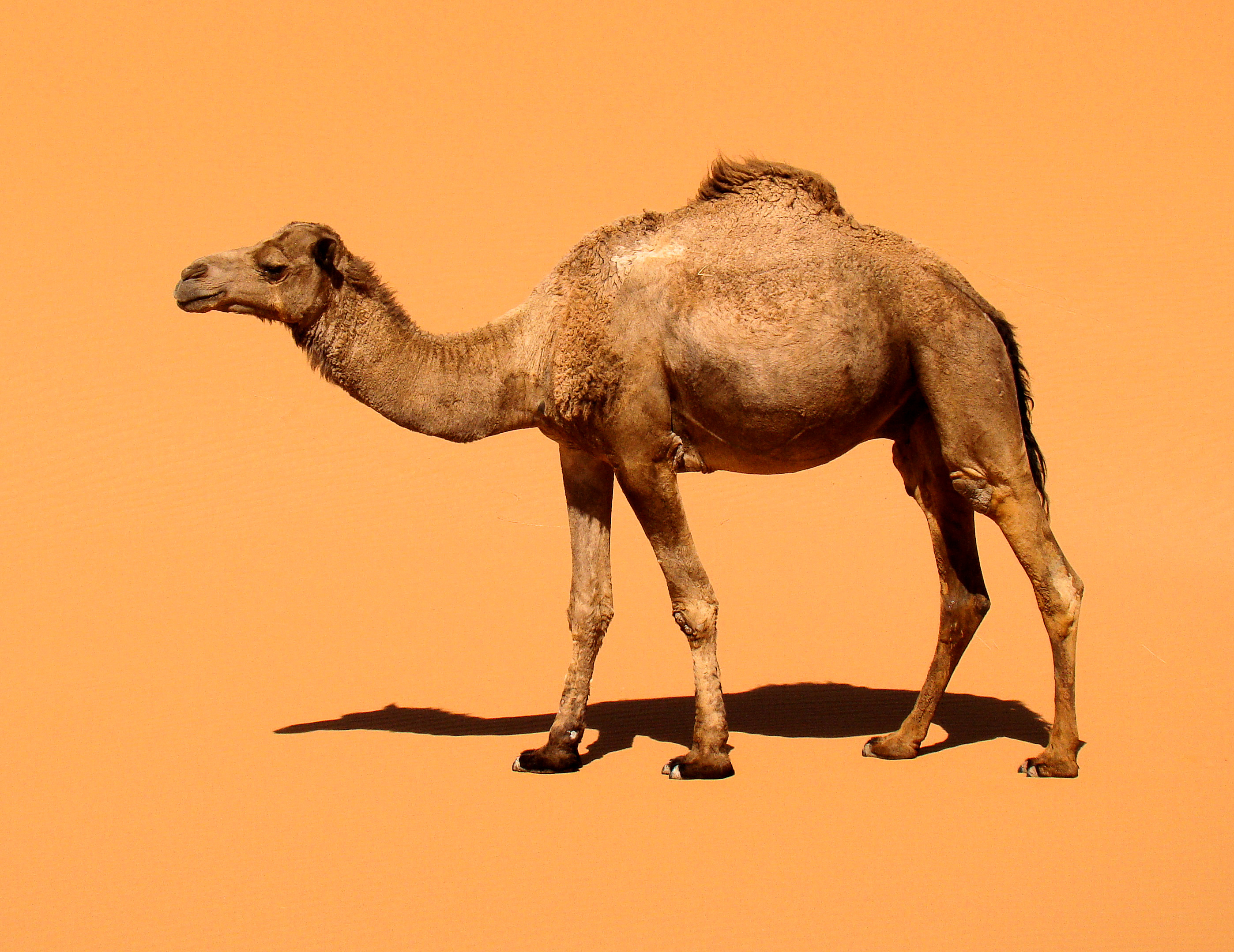
Body for comparison with skeleton

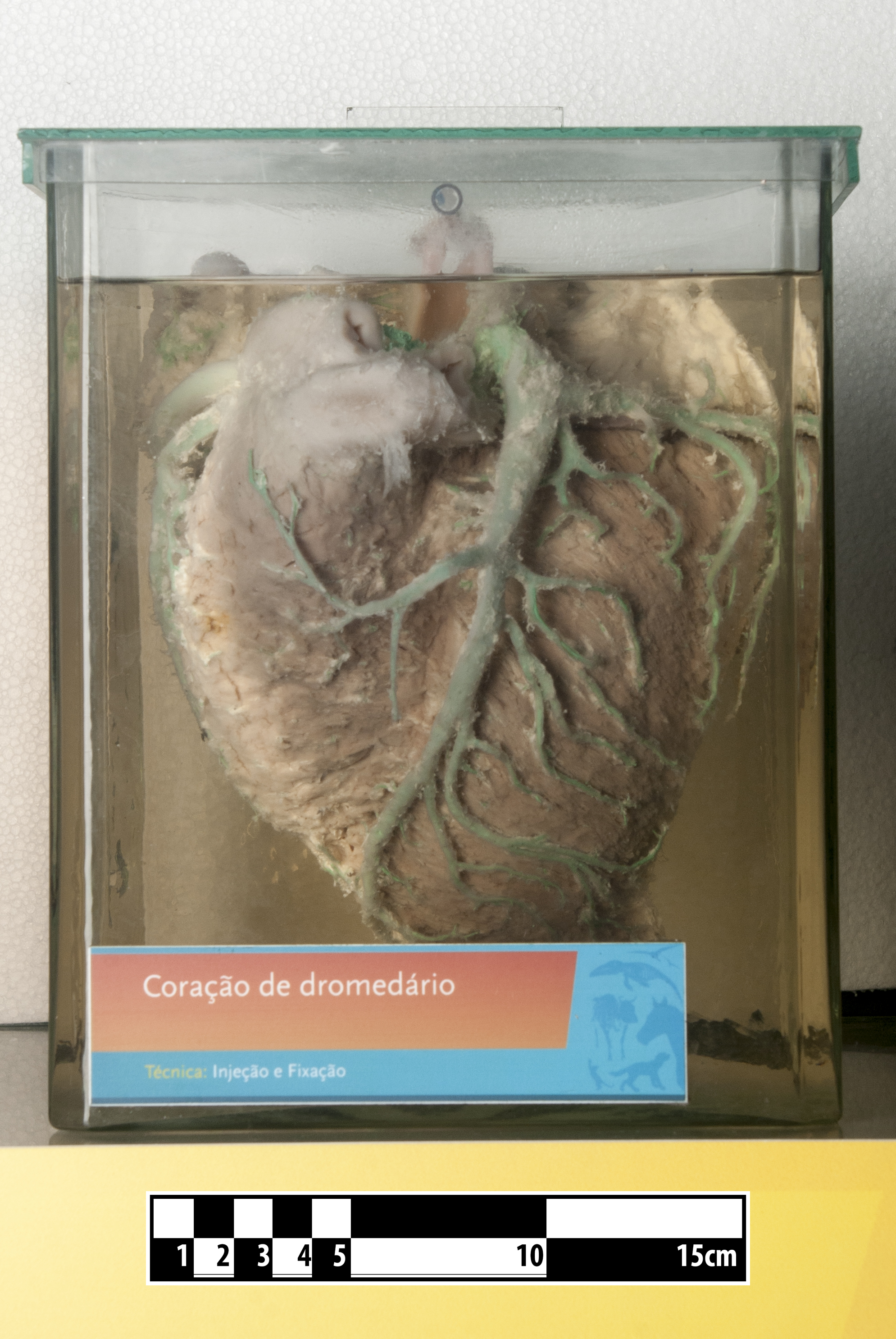
Dromedary heart

The cranium of the dromedary consists of a postorbital bar, a tympanic bulla filled with spongiosa, a well-defined sagittal crest, a long facial part and an indented nasal bone. Typically, there are eight sternal and four non-sternal pairs of ribs. The spinal cord is nearly 214 cm (84 in) long; it terminates in the second and third sacral vertebra. The fibula is reduced to a malleolar bone. The dromedary is a digitigrade animal; it walks on its toes, which are known as digits. It lacks the second and fifth digits. The front feet are 19 cm (7.5 in) wide and 18 cm (7.1 in) long; they are larger than the hind feet, which measure 17 cm (6.7 in) wide and 16 cm (6.3 in) long.

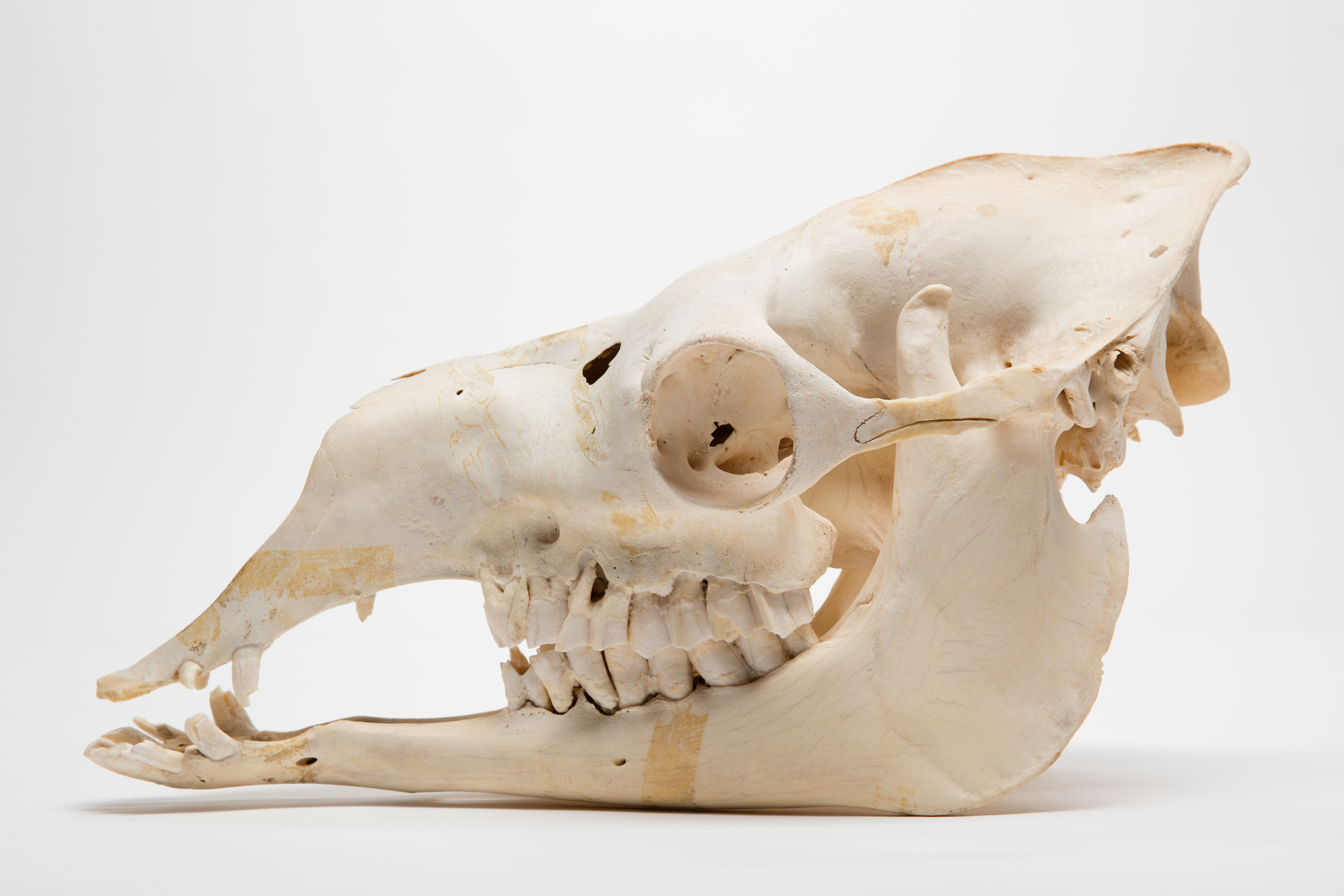
A dromedary skull

The dromedary has 22 milk teeth, which are eventually replaced by 34 permanent teeth. The dental formula for permanent dentition is 1.1.3.33.1.2.3, and 1.1.33.1.2 for milk dentition. In the juvenile, the lower first molars develop by 12 to 15 months and the permanent lower incisors appear at 4.5 to 6.5 years of age. All teeth are in use by 8 years. The lenses of the eyes contain crystallin, which constitutes 8 to 13% of the protein present there.

The skin is black; the epidermis is 0.038–0.064 mm (0.0015–0.0025 in) thick and the dermis is 2.2–4.7 mm (0.087–0.185 in) thick. The hump is composed of fat bound together by fibrous tissue. There are no glands on the face; males have glands that appear to be modified apocrine sweat glands that secrete pungent, coffee-coloured fluid during the rut, located on either side of the neck midline. The glands generally grow heavier during the rut, and range from 20 to 115 g (0.71 to 4.06 oz). Each cover hair is associated with an arrector pilli muscle, a hair follicle, a ring of sebaceous glands and a sweat gland. Females have cone-shaped, four-chambered mammary glands that are 2.4 cm (0.94 in) long with a base diameter of 1.5 cm (0.59 in). These glands can produce milk with up to 90% water content even if the mother is at risk of dehydration.

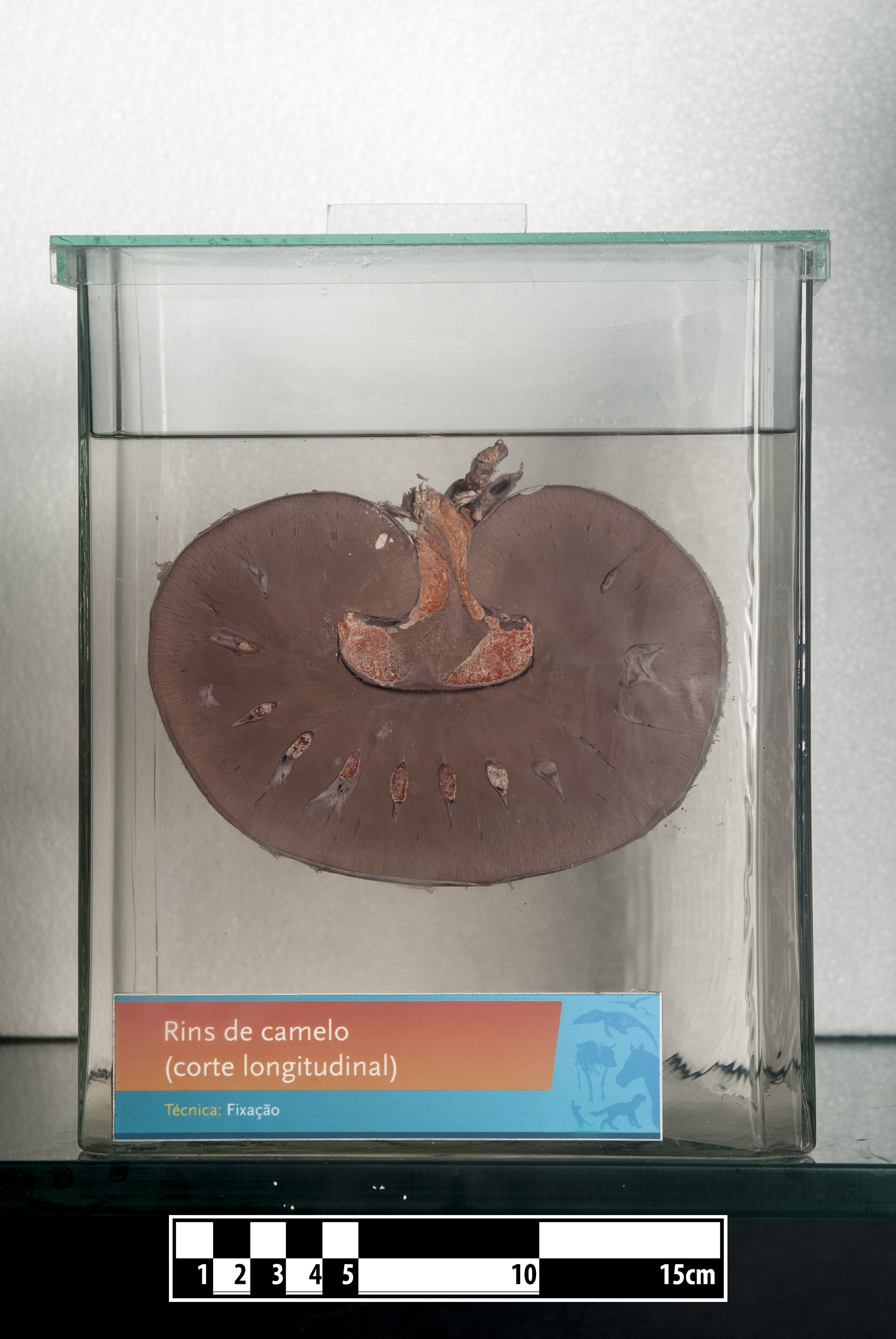
Camel kidney (longitudinal cut)

The heart weighs around 5 kg (11 lb); it has two ventricles with the tip curving to the left. The pulse rate is 50 beats per minute. The dromedary is the only mammal with oval red blood corpuscles, which facilitates blood flow during dehydration. The pH of the blood varies from 7.1 to 7.6 (slightly alkaline). The individual's state of hydration and sex and the time of year can influence blood values. The lungs lack lobes. A dehydrated camel has a lower breathing rate. Each kidney has a capacity of 858 cm^{3} (52.4 cu in), and can produce urine with high chloride concentrations. Like the horse, the dromedary has no gall bladder. The grayish violet, crescent-like spleen weighs less than 500 g (18 oz). The triangular, four-chambered liver weighs 6.5 kg (14 lb); its dimensions are 60 cm × 42 cm × 18 cm (23.6 in × 16.5 in × 7.1 in).

==== Reproductive system ====
The ovaries are reddish, circular and flattened. They are enclosed in a conical bursa and have the dimensions 4 cm × 2.5 cm × 0.5 cm (1.6 in × 0.98 in × 0.20 in) during anestrus. The oviducts are 25–28 cm (9.8–11.0 in) long. The uterus is bicornuate. The vagina is 3–3.5 cm (1.2–1.4 in) long and has well-developed Bartholin's glands. The vulva is 3–5 cm (1.2–2.0 in) deep and has a small clitoris. The placenta is diffuse and epitheliochorial, with a crescent-like chorion.

The penis is covered by a triangular penile sheath that opens backwards; it is about 60 cm (24 in) long. The scrotum is located high in the perineum with the testicles in separate sacs. Testicles are 7–10 cm (2.8–3.9 in) long, 4.5 cm (1.8 in) deep and 5 cm (2.0 in) wide. The right testicle is often smaller than the left. The typical mass of either testicle is less than 140 g (4.9 oz); during the rut the mass increases from 165 to 253 g (5.8 to 8.9 oz). The Cowper's gland is white, almond-shaped and lacks seminal vesicles; the prostate gland is dark yellow, disc-shaped and divided into two lobes. The camel epididymis interstitium revealed several blood vessels harboring special regulatory devices such as the spiral arteries, spiral veins, and throttle arterioles.

=== Health and diseases ===
The dromedary generally suffers from fewer diseases than other domestic livestock such as goats and cattle. Temperature fluctuations occur throughout the day in a healthy dromedary – the temperature falls to its minimum at dawn, rises until sunset and falls during the night. Nervous camels may vomit if they are carelessly handled; this does not always indicate a disorder. Rutting males may develop nausea.

The dromedary is prone to trypanosomiasis, a disease caused by a parasite transmitted by the tsetse fly. The main symptoms are recurring fever, anaemia and weakness; the disease is typically fatal for the camel. Brucellosis is another prominent malady. In an observational study, the seroprevalence of this disease was generally low (2 to 5%) in nomadic or moderately free dromedaries, but it was higher (8 to 15%) in denser populations. Brucellosis is caused by different biotypes of Brucella abortus and B. melitensis. Other internal parasites include Fasciola gigantica (trematode), two types of cestode (tapeworm) and various nematodes (roundworms). Among external parasites, Sarcoptes species cause sarcoptic mange. In a 2000 study in Jordan, 83% of the 32 camels studied tested positive for sarcoptic mange. In another study, dromedaries were found to have natural antibodies against the rinderpest and ovine rinderpest viruses.

In 2013, a seroepidemiological study (a study investigating the patterns, causes and effects of a disease on a specific population on the basis of serologic tests) in Egypt was the first to show the dromedary might be a host for the Middle East respiratory syndrome coronavirus (MERS-CoV). A 2013–14 study of dromedaries in Saudi Arabia concluded the unusual genetic stability of MERS-CoV coupled with its high seroprevalence in the dromedary makes this camel a highly probable host for the virus. The full genome sequence of MERS-CoV from dromedaries in this study showed a 99.9% match to the genomes of human clade B MERS-CoV. Another study in Saudi Arabia showed the presence of MERS-CoV in 90% of the evaluated dromedaries and suggested that camels could be the animal source of MERS-CoV.

Fleas and ticks are common causes of physical irritation. Hyalomma dromedarii is especially adapted to arid conditions, changing its moulting process to complete more or all of its life cycle on a single host if stressed, and having an unusually wide host range. The larvae are not well understood but their larval questing phase is assumed to occur during the winter, which is also when rain arrives. The nymphs infest the host mostly in January, then the adults May to September. In a study in Egypt, H. dromedarii was dominant in dromedaries, comprising 95.6% of the adult ticks isolated from the camels. Larvae of the camel nasal fly Cephalopina titillator can cause possibly fatal brain compression and nervous disorders. Illnesses that can affect dromedary productivity are pyogenic diseases and wound infections caused by Corynebacterium and Streptococcus, pulmonary disorders caused by Pasteurella such as hemorrhagic septicemia and Rickettsia species, camelpox, anthrax, and cutaneous necrosis caused by Streptothrix and deficiency of salt in the diet.

== Ecology ==
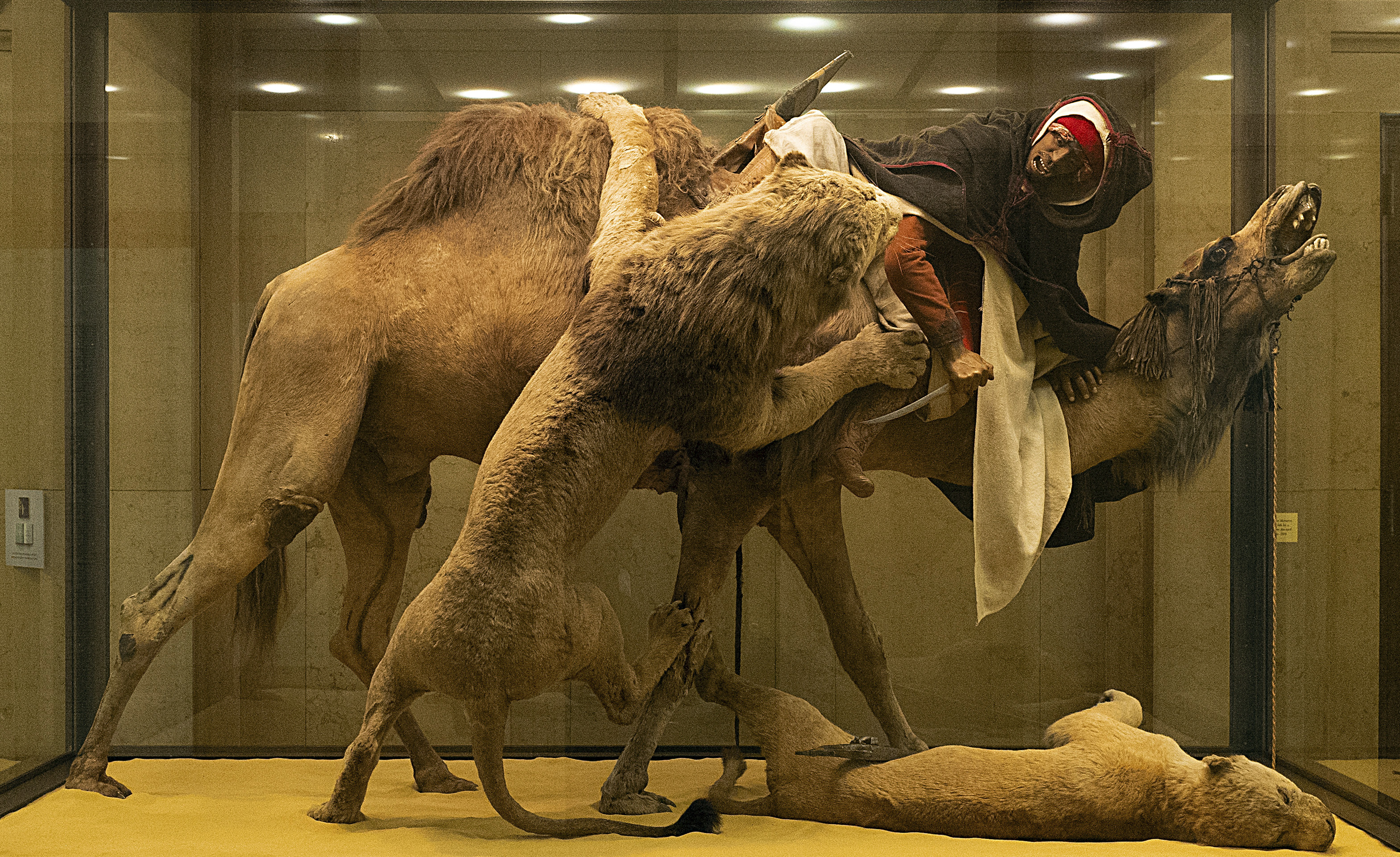
"Lion Attacking a Dromedary," a 19th-century taxidermy diorama by Jules and Édouard Verreaux

The dromedary is diurnal (active mainly during daylight); free-ranging herds feed and roam throughout the day, though they rest during the hottest hours around noon. The night is mainly spent resting. Dromedaries form cohesive groups of about 20 individuals, which consist of several females led by a dominant male. Females may also lead in turns. Some males either form bachelor groups or roam alone. Herds may congregate to form associations of hundreds of camels during migrations at the time of natural disasters. The males of the herd prevent female members from interacting with bachelor males by standing or walking between them and sometimes driving the bachelor males away. In Australia, short-term home ranges of feral dromedaries cover 50 to 150 km^{2} (19 to 58 sq mi); annual home ranges can spread over several thousand square kilometres.

Special behavioral features of the dromedary include snapping at others without biting them and showing displeasure by stamping their feet. They are generally non-aggressive, with the exception of rutting males. They appear to remember their homes; females, in particular, remember the places they first gave birth or suckled their offspring. Males become aggressive in the mating season, and sometimes wrestle. A 1980 study showed androgen levels in males influences their behavior. Between January and April when these levels are high during the rut, they become difficult to manage, blow out the palate from the mouth, vocalize and throw urine over their backs. Camels scratch parts of their bodies with their legs or with their lower incisors. They may also rub against tree bark and roll in the sand.

Free-ranging dromedaries face large predators typical of their regional distribution, which includes wolves, lions and tigers.

=== Diet ===
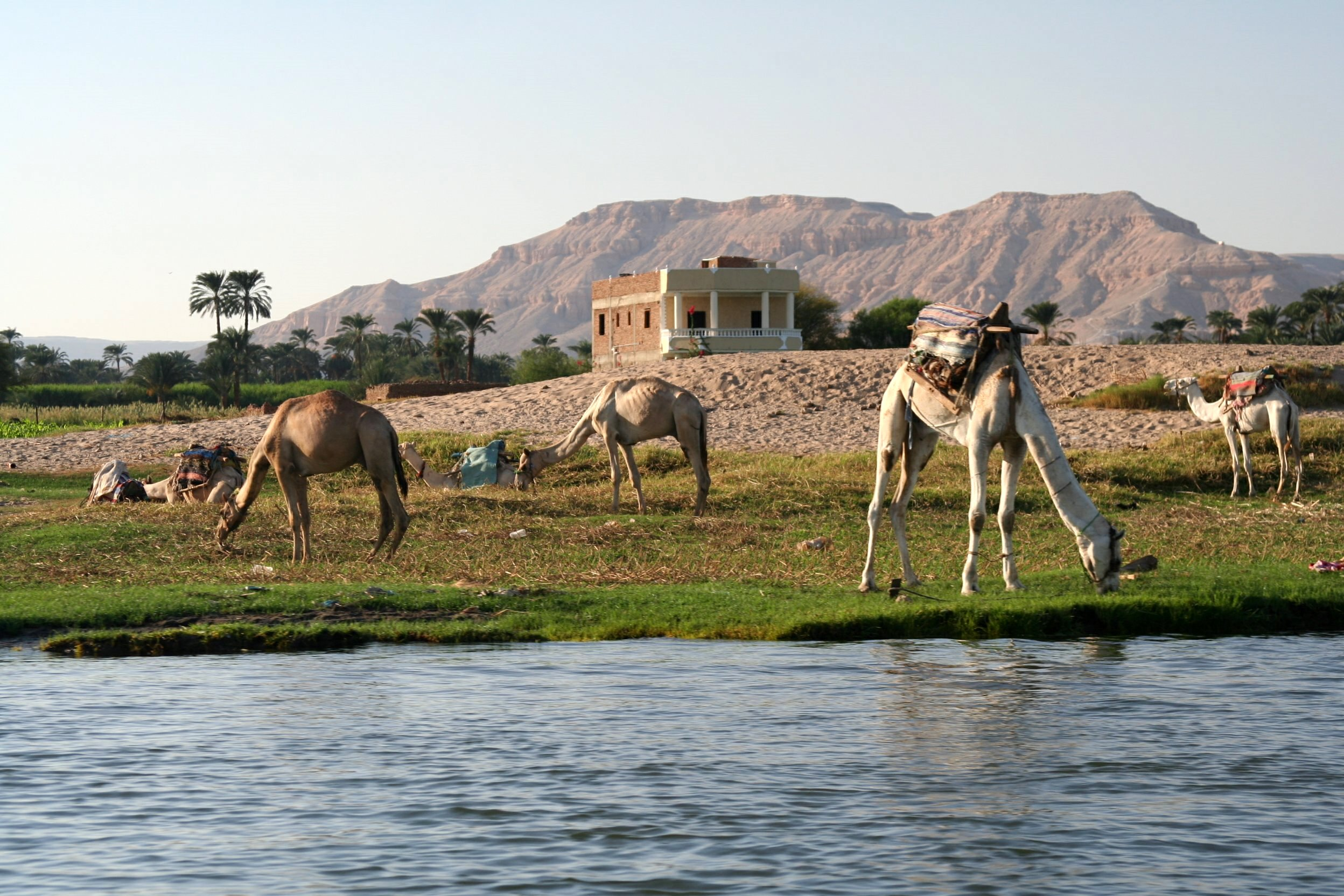
Dromedaries are primarily browsers

The dromedary's diet consists mostly of foliage, dry grasses and desert vegetation – mostly thorny plants. A study said the typical diet of the dromedary is dwarf shrubs (47.5%), trees (29.9%), grasses (11.2%), other herbs (0.2%) and vines (11%). The dromedary is primarily a browser; forbs and shrubs comprise 70% of its diet in summer and 90% of its diet in winter. The dromedary may also graze on tall, young, succulent grasses.

In the Sahara, 332 plant species have been recorded as food plants of the dromedary. These include Aristida pungens, Acacia tortilis, Panicum turgidum, Launaea arborescens and Balanites aegyptiaca. The dromedary eats Acacia, Atriplex and Salsola when they are available. Feral dromedaries in Australia prefer Trichodesma zeylanicum and Euphorbia tannensis. In India, dromedaries are fed with forage plants such as Vigna aconitifolia, V. mungo, Cyamopsis tetragonolaba, Melilotus parviflora, Eruca sativa, Trifolium species and Brassica campestris. Dromedaries keep their mouths open while chewing thorny food. They use their lips to grasp the food and chew each bite 40 to 50 times. Its long eyelashes, eyebrows, lockable nostrils, caudal opening of the prepuce and a relatively small vulva help the camel avoid injuries, especially while feeding. They graze for 8–12 hours per day and ruminate for an equal amount of time.

== Biology ==
=== Adaptations ===
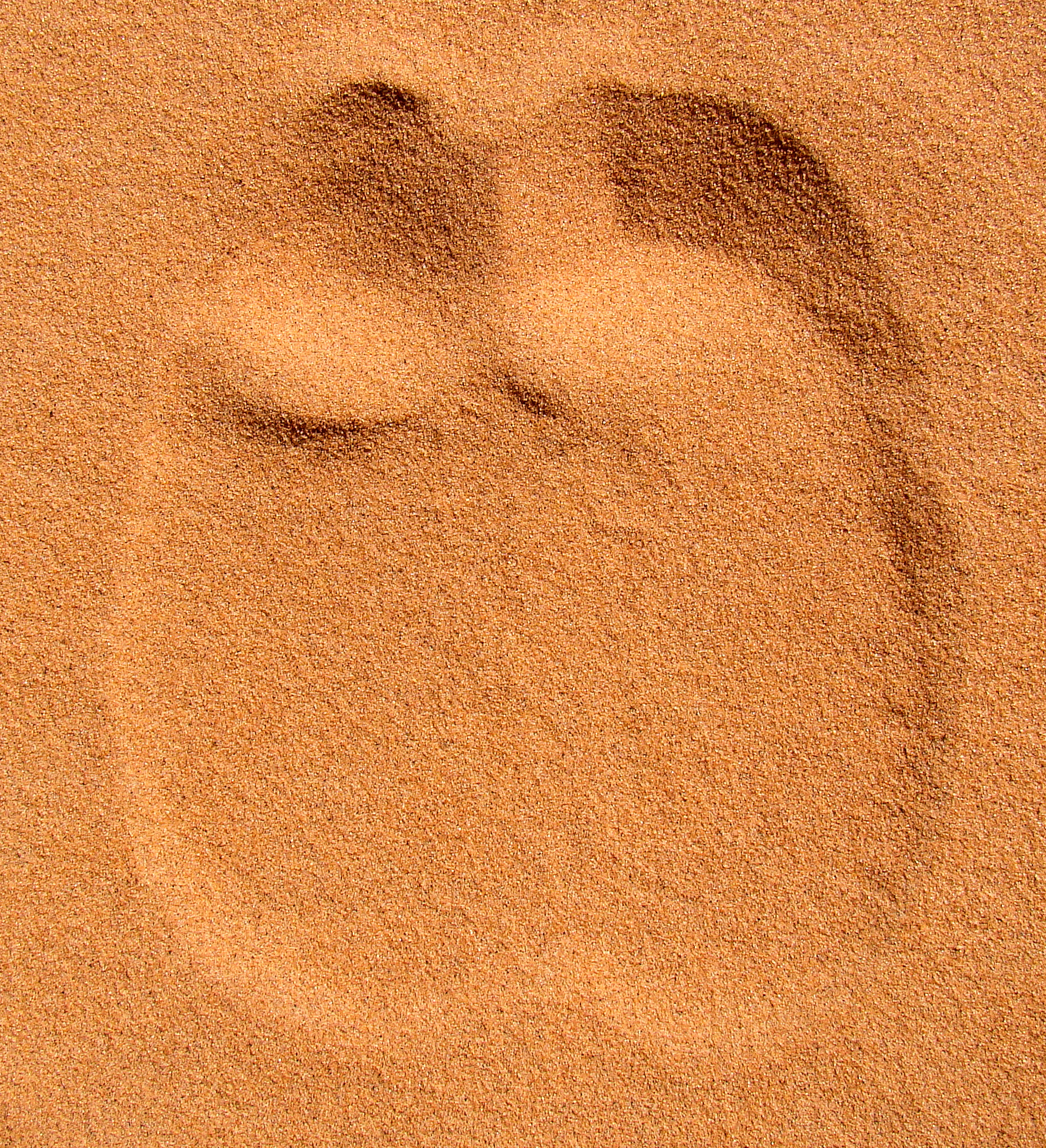
Footprint in dry sand

The dromedary is specially adapted to its desert habitat; these adaptations are aimed at conserving water and regulating body temperature. The bushy eyebrows and the double row of eyelashes prevent sand and dust from entering the eyes during strong windstorms, and shield them from the sun's glare. The dromedary is able to close its nostrils voluntarily; this assists in water conservation. The dromedary can conserve water by reducing perspiration by fluctuating the body temperature throughout the day from 31 to 41.7 °C (87.8 to 107.1 °F). The kidneys are specialized to minimize water loss through excretion. Groups of camels avoid excess heat from the environment by pressing against each other. The dromedary can tolerate greater than 30% water loss, which is generally impossible for other mammals. In temperatures between 30 and 40 °C (86 and 104 °F), it needs water every 10 to 15 days. In the hottest temperatures, the dromedary takes water every four to seven days. Dromedaries have a quick rate of rehydration, drinking up to 114 L (25 imp gal) in a single sitting, at a rate of 10–20 L (2.2–4.4 imp gal) per minute. The dromedary has a rete mirabile, a complex of arteries and veins lying very close to each other which uses countercurrent blood flow to cool blood flowing to the brain. This effectively controls the temperature of the brain.

The hump stores up to 80 lb (36 kg) of fat, which the camel can break down into energy to meet its needs when resources are scarce; the hump also helps dissipate body heat. When this tissue is metabolized, through fat metabolization, it releases energy while causing water to evaporate from the lungs during respiration (as oxygen is required for the metabolic process): overall, there is a net decrease in water. If the hump is small, the animal can show signs of starvation. In a 2005 study, the mean volume of adipose tissues (in the external part of the hump that have cells to store lipids) is related to the dromedary's unique mechanism of food and water storage. In case of starvation, they can even eat fish and bones, and drink brackish and salty water. The hair is longer on the throat, hump and shoulders. Though the padded hooves effectively support the camel's weight on the ground, they are not suitable for walking on slippery and muddy surfaces.

=== Reproduction ===
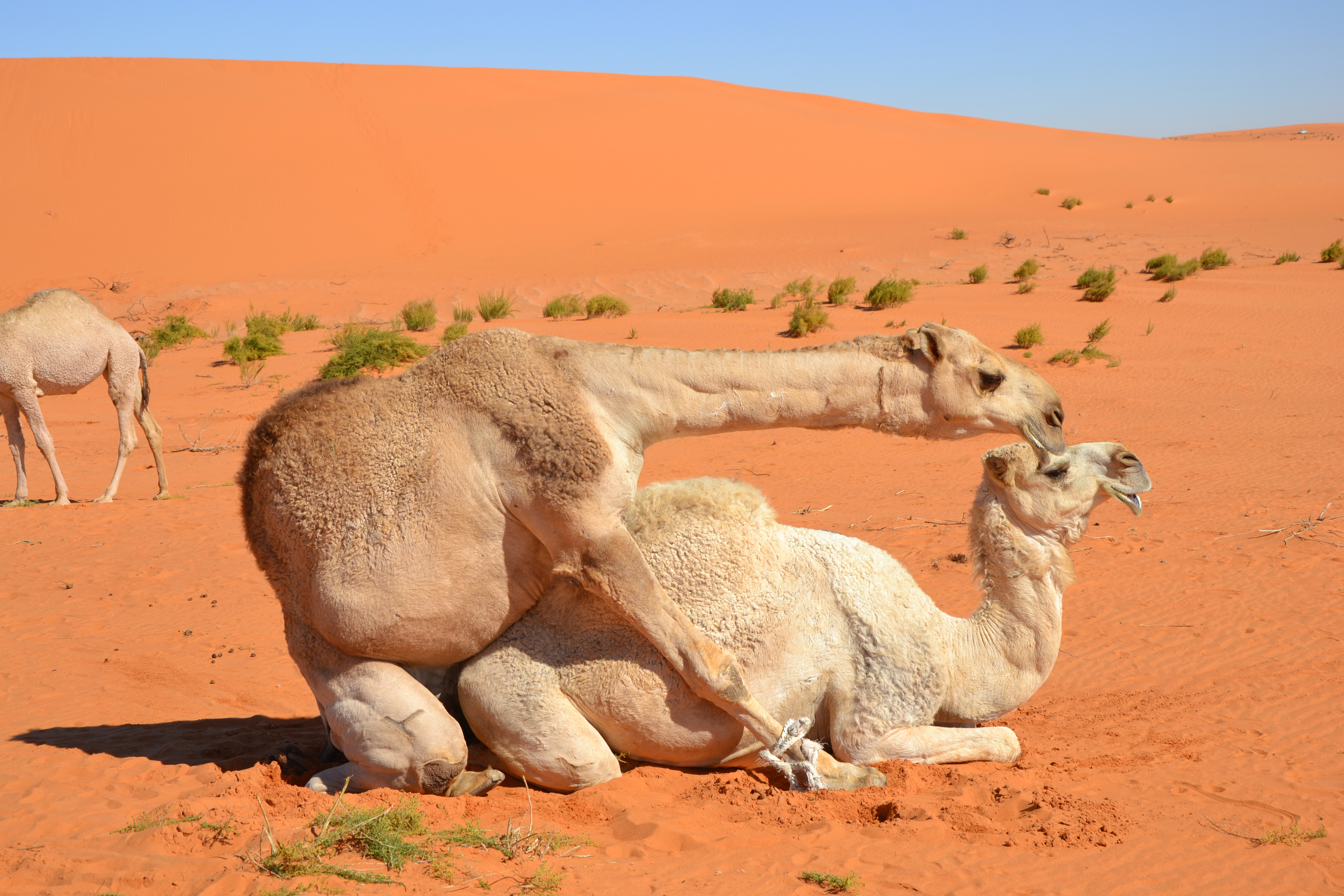
Mating

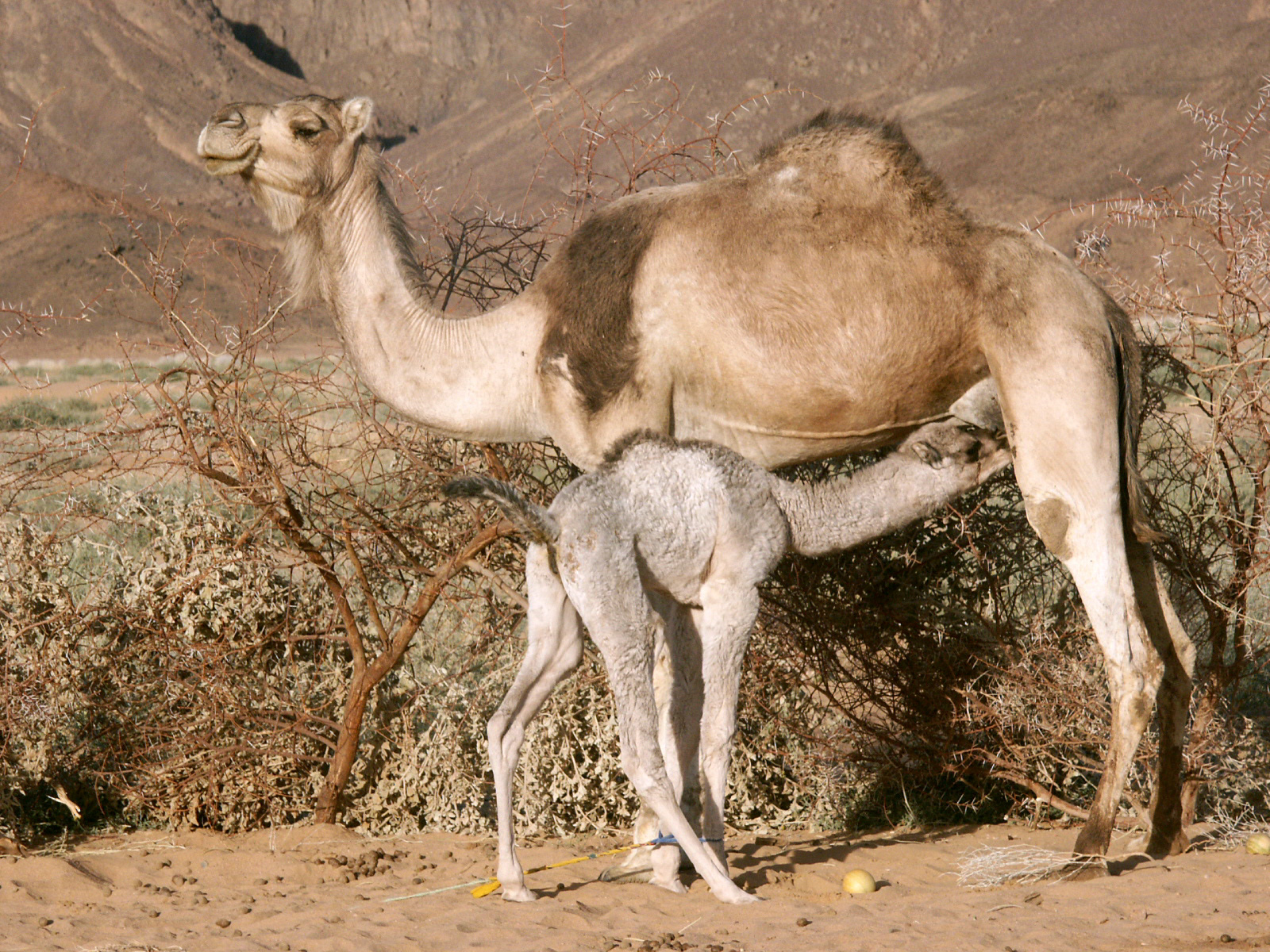
Calf suckling

Camels have a slow growth rate and reach sexual maturity slower than sheep or goat. The age of sexual maturity varies geographically and depends on the individual, as does the reproductive period. Both sexes might mature by three to five years of age, though successful breeding could take longer. Camels are described as atypical seasonal breeders; they exhibit spermatogenesis throughout the whole year with a reduction in spermatogenesis during the nonbreeding season compared to that in the breeding season (Zayed et al., 1995). The breeding season in Egypt is during spring; the spring months. Mating occurs once a year, and peaks in the rainy season. The mating season lasts three to five months, but may last a year for older animals.

During the reproductive season, males splash their urine on their tails and nether regions. To attract females they extrude their soft palate – a trait unique to the dromedary. As the male gurgles, copious quantities of saliva turns to foam and covers the mouth. Males threaten each other for dominance over the female by trying to stand taller than the other, making low noises and a series of head movements including lowering, lifting and bending their necks backward. Males try to defeat other males by biting the opponent's legs and taking the head between his jaws. Copulation begins with foreplay; the male smells the female's genitalia and often bites her there or around her hump. The male forces the female to sit, then grasps her with his forelegs. Camelmen often aid the male insert his penis into the female's vulva. The male dromedary's ability to penetrate the female on his own is disputed, though feral populations in Australia reproduce naturally. Copulation takes from 7 to 35 minutes, averaging 11 to 15 minutes. Normally, three to four ejaculations occur. The semen of a Bikaneri dromedary is white and viscous, with a pH of around 7.8.

A single calf is born after a gestation period of 15 months. Calves move freely by the end of their first day. Nursing and maternal care continue for one to two years. In a study to find whether young could exist on milk substitutes, two male, month-old camels were separated from their mothers and were fed on milk substitutes prepared commercially for lambs, and they grew to normal weights for male calves after 30 days. Lactational yield can vary with species, breed, individual, region, diet, management conditions and lactating stage. The largest quantity of milk is produced during the early period of lactation. The lactation period can vary between nine and eighteen months.

Dromedaries are induced ovulators. Oestrus may be cued by the nutritional status of the camel and the length of day. If mating does not occur, the follicle, which grows during oestrus, usually regresses within a few days. In one study, 35 complete oestrous cycles were observed in five nonpregnant females over 15 months. The cycles were about 28 days long; follicles matured in six days, maintained their size for 13 days, and returned to their original size in eight days. In another study, ovulation could be best induced when the follicle reaches a size of 0.9–1.9 cm (0.35–0.75 in). In another study, pregnancy in females could be recognized as early as 40 to 45 days of gestation by the swelling of the left uterine horn, where 99.5% of pregnancies were located.

== History ==
The dromedary was first domesticated in the southern Arabian Peninsula around 4000–3000 BC. Archaeological and rock art evidence puts the earliest dromedary in North Africa by 1500BC at the latest, but they were not extensively used as livestock and beasts of burden until later, as the environment of the Sahara became more arid. They may have been separately domesticated in Africa c. 1000 BC. Dromedaries were likely present in Egypt by the time of the Biblical patriarchs, and may have been introduced by the Assyrians from Arabia or Mesopotamia.

The first written record of the dromedary in North Africa dates to Julius Caesar's campaigns in 46 BC. The relative lack of texts mentioning the dromedary has led to a misconception that it was first imported into Africa by the Romans in the first few centuries AD, but this is incorrect. By the 3rd century AD, they were present south of the Sahara in the Senegal river valley.

The popularity of dromedaries increased after the Islamic conquest of North Africa. While the invasion was accomplished largely on horseback, new links to the Middle East allowed camels to be imported en masse. These camels were well-suited to long desert journeys and could carry a great deal of cargo, increasing the amount of trans-Saharan trade. In Libya, dromedaries were used for transport and their milk and meat constituted the local diet.

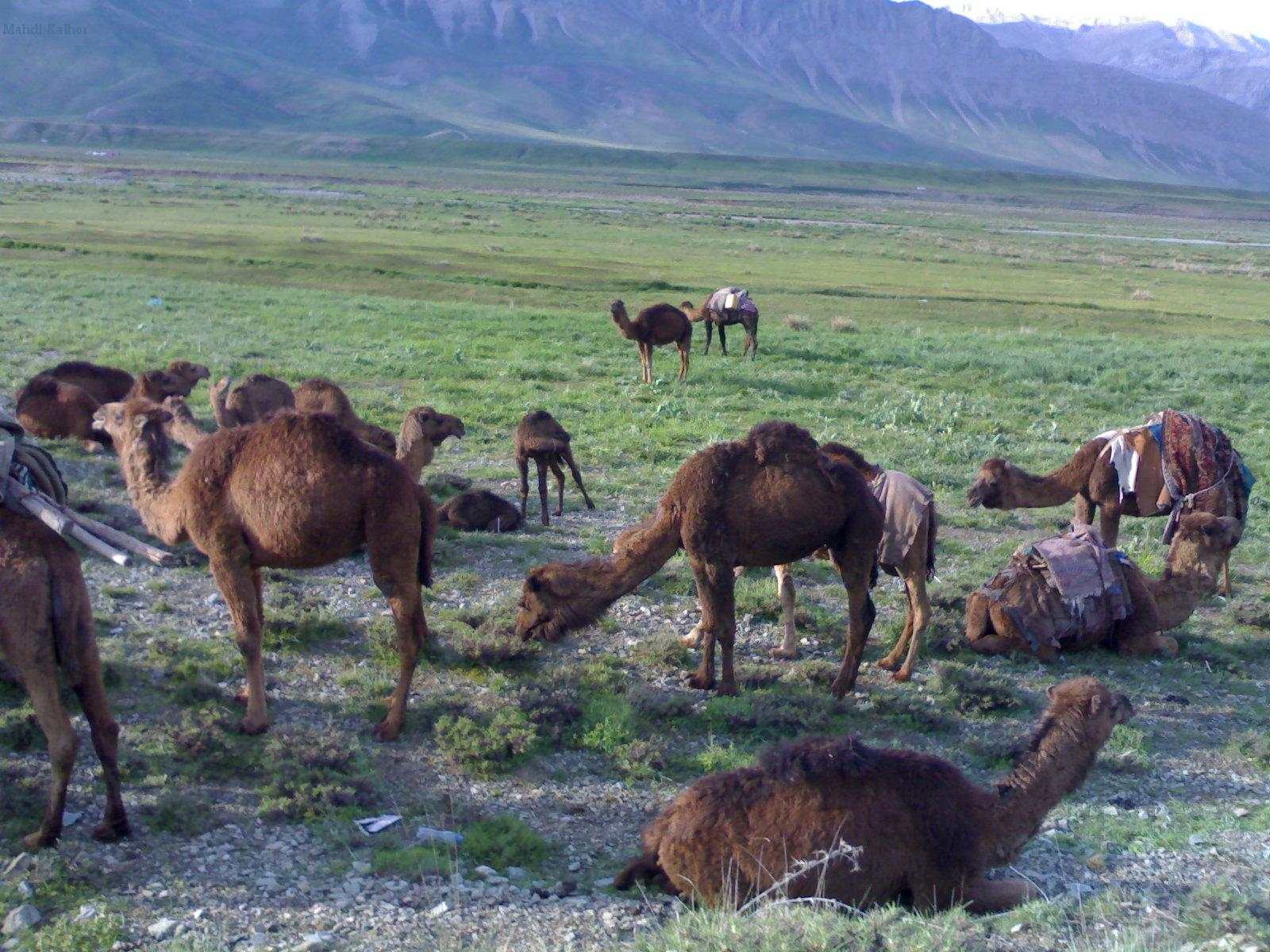
Dromedaries near the base of the Alborz mountain range in Iran

Dromedaries were also shipped from south-western Asia to Spain, Italy, Turkey, France, Canary Islands, the Americas and Australia. Dromedaries were introduced into Spain in 1020 AD and to Sicily in 1059 AD. Camels were exported to the Canary Islands in 1405 during the European colonisation of the area, and are still extant there, especially in Lanzarote and to the south of Fuerteventura. Attempts to introduce dromedaries into the Caribbean, Colombia, Peru, Bolivia and Brazil were made between the 17th and 19th centuries; some were imported to the western United States in the 1850s and some to Namibia in the early 1900s, but presently they exist in small numbers or are absent in these areas.

In 1840, about six camels were shipped from Tenerife to Adelaide, but only one survived the journey to arrive on 12 October that year. The animal, a male called Harry, was owned by the explorer John Ainsworth Horrocks. Harry was ill-tempered but was included in an expedition the following year because he could carry heavy loads. The next major group of camels were imported into Australia in 1860, and between 1860 and 1907 10 to 12 thousand were imported. These were used mainly for riding and transport.

== Range ==
Its range includes hot, arid regions of northern Africa, Ethiopia, the Near East, and western and central Asia. The dromedary typically thrives in areas with a long dry season and a short wet season. They are sensitive to cold and humidity, though some breeds can thrive in humid conditions.

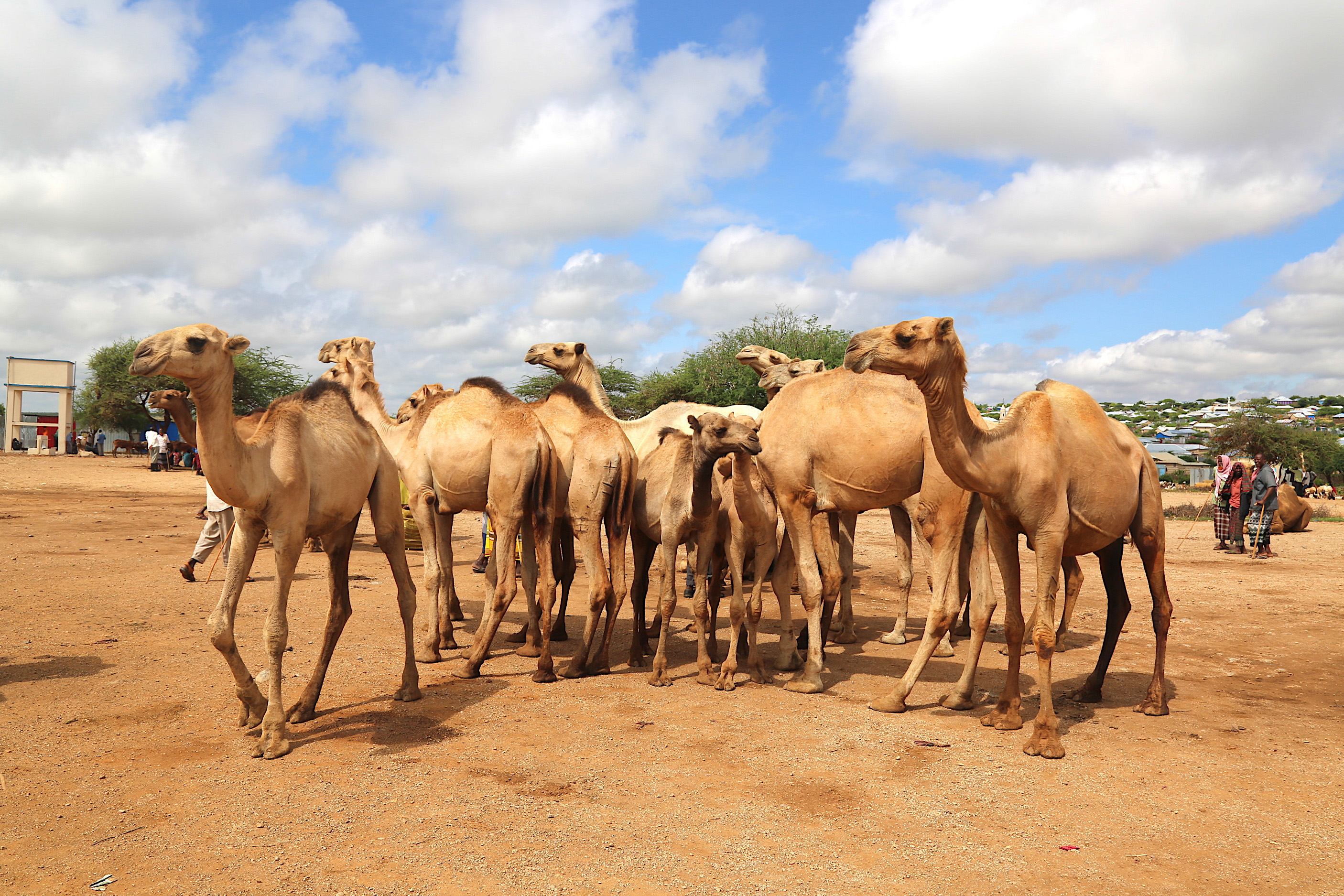
A herd of dromedaries in Baidoa, Somalia

=== Current distribution of captive animals ===
In the early 21st century, the domesticated dromedary is found in the semi-arid to arid regions of the Old World.

==== Africa ====
Africa has more than 80% of the world's total dromedary population; it occurs in almost every desert zone in the northern part of the continent. The Sahel marks the southern extreme of its range, where the annual rainfall is around 550 mm (22 in). The Horn of Africa has nearly 35% of the world's dromedaries; most of the region's stock is in Somalia, followed by Sudan, Eritrea, and Ethiopia (as of the early 2000s). According to the Yearbook of the Food and Agriculture Organization (FAO) for 1984, eastern Africa had about 10 million dromedaries, the largest population of Africa. Western Africa followed with 2.14 million, while northern Africa had nearly 0.76 million. Populations in Africa increased by 16% from 1994 to 2005.

==== Asia ====
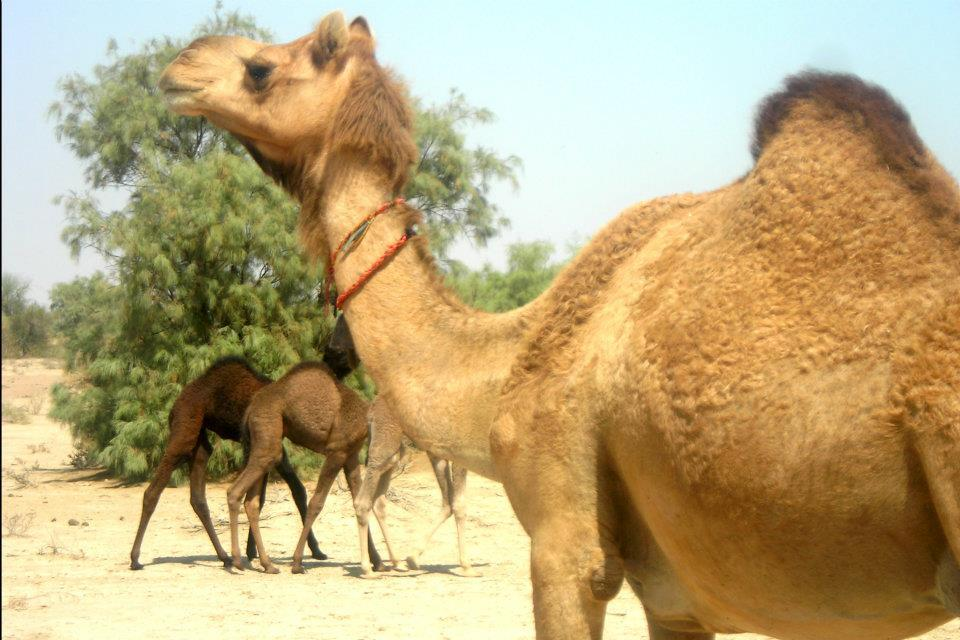
Dromedaries in Punjab, Pakistan

In Asia, nearly 70% of the population occurs in India and Pakistan. The combined population of the dromedary and the Bactrian camel decreased by around 21% between 1994 and 2004. The dromedary is sympatric with the Bactrian camel in Afghanistan, Pakistan, and central and southwestern Asia. India has a dromedary population of less than one million, with most (0.67 million) in the state of Rajasthan. Populations in Pakistan decreased from 1.1 million in 1994 to 0.8 million in 2005 – a 29% decline. According to the FAO, the dromedary population in six countries of the Persian Gulf was nearly 0.67 million in 2003. In the Persian Gulf region the dromedary is locally classified into breeds including Al-Majahem, Al-Hamrah, Al-Safrah, Al-Zarkah and Al-Shakha, based on coat colour. The UAE has three prominent breeds: Racing camel, Al-Arabiat and Al-Kazmiat.

=== Feral population ===
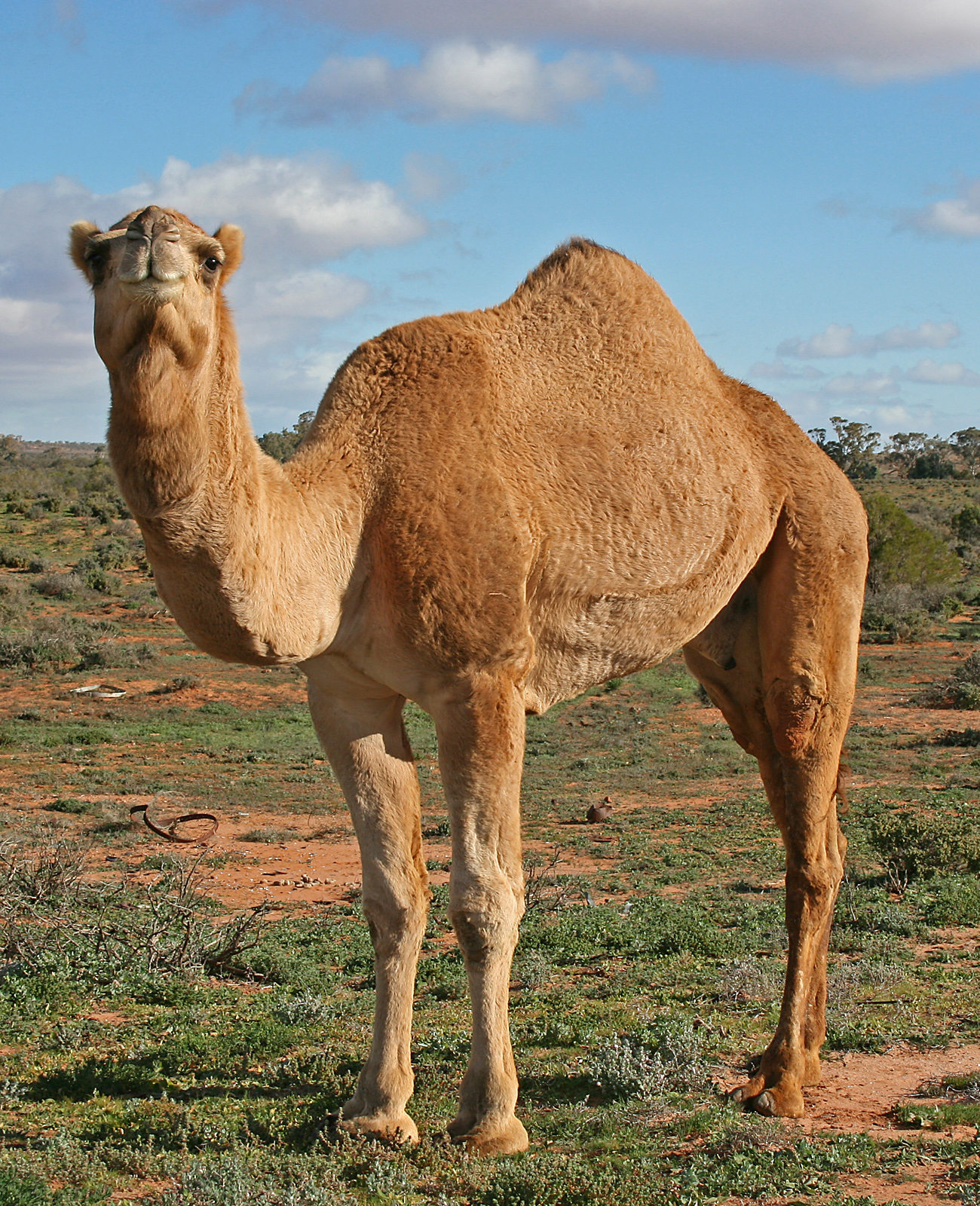
A dromedary in outback Australia, near Silverton, New South Wales, Australia. Feral dromedaries are only found in Australia.

Feral dromedary populations occur in Australia, where they were introduced in 1840. The total dromedary population in Australia was 500,000 in 2005. Nearly 99% of the populations are feral, and they have an annual growth rate of 10%. Most of the dromedaries exist in Western Australia, with smaller populations in the Northern Territory, Western Queensland and northern South Australia.

Feral populations notwithstanding, the dromedary camel has been functionally extinct from the wild for the past 2,000 years.

== Relationship with humans ==
The strength and docility of the dromedary make it popular as a domesticated animal. According to Richard Bulliet, they can be used for a wide variety of purposes: riding, transport, ploughing, and trading and as a source of milk, meat, wool and leather. The main attraction of the dromedary for nomadic desert-dwellers is the wide variety of resources they provide, which are crucial for their survival. It is important for several Bedouin pastoralist tribes of northern Arabia, such as the Ruwallah, the Rashaida, the Bani Sakhr and the Mutayr.

Camel urine and camel milk are used for medicinal purposes.

=== Riding camels ===
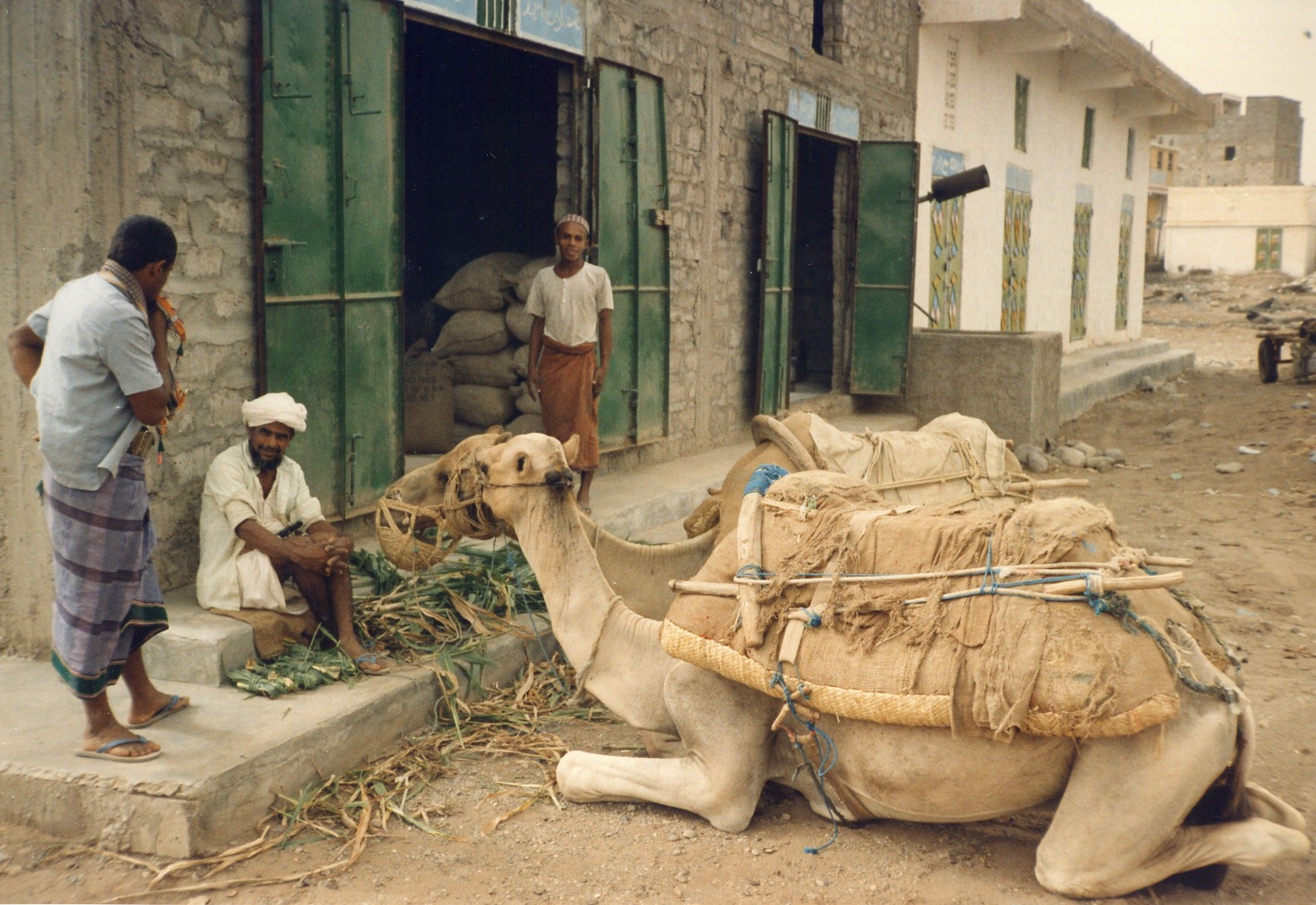
Dromedaries at Bait al-Faqih Market, Yemen

Although the role of the camel is diminishing with the advent of technology and modern means of transport, it is still an efficient mode of communication in remote and less-developed areas. The dromedary has been used in warfare since the 6th century BC. It is particularly prized for its capability to outrun horses in the deserts. Record of its use during the time of Alexander the Great indicate that dromedaries could cover up to 50 miles per day for a week and go for up to a month without water. An account by Aurelian also cited that, in his escape to Euphrates, Zenobia used a dromedary to outrun her pursuers after she was defeated at Palmyra.

The dromedary also remains popular for racing, particularly in the Arab world. Riding camels of Arabia, Egypt and the Sahara are locally known as the Dilool, the Hageen, and the Mehara respectively; several local breeds are included within these groups.

The ideal riding camel is strong, slender and long-legged with thin, supple skin. The special adaptations of the dromedary's feet allow it to walk with ease on sandy and rough terrain and on cold surfaces. The camels of the Bejas of Sudan and the Hedareb, Bilen, and the Tigre people of Eritrea and the Anafi camel bred in Sudan are common breeds used as riding camels.

According to Leese, the dromedary walks with four speeds or gaits: walk, jog, fast run and canter. The first is the typical speed of walking, around 4 km/h (2.5 mph). Jog is the most common speed, nearly 8–12 km/h (5.0–7.5 mph) on level ground. He estimated a speed of 14–19 km/h (8.7–11.8 mph) during a fast run, by observing northern African and Arabian dromedaries. He gave no speed range to describe the canter, but implied it was a type of gallop that if induced could exhaust the camel and the rider. Canter could be used only for short periods of time, for example in races.

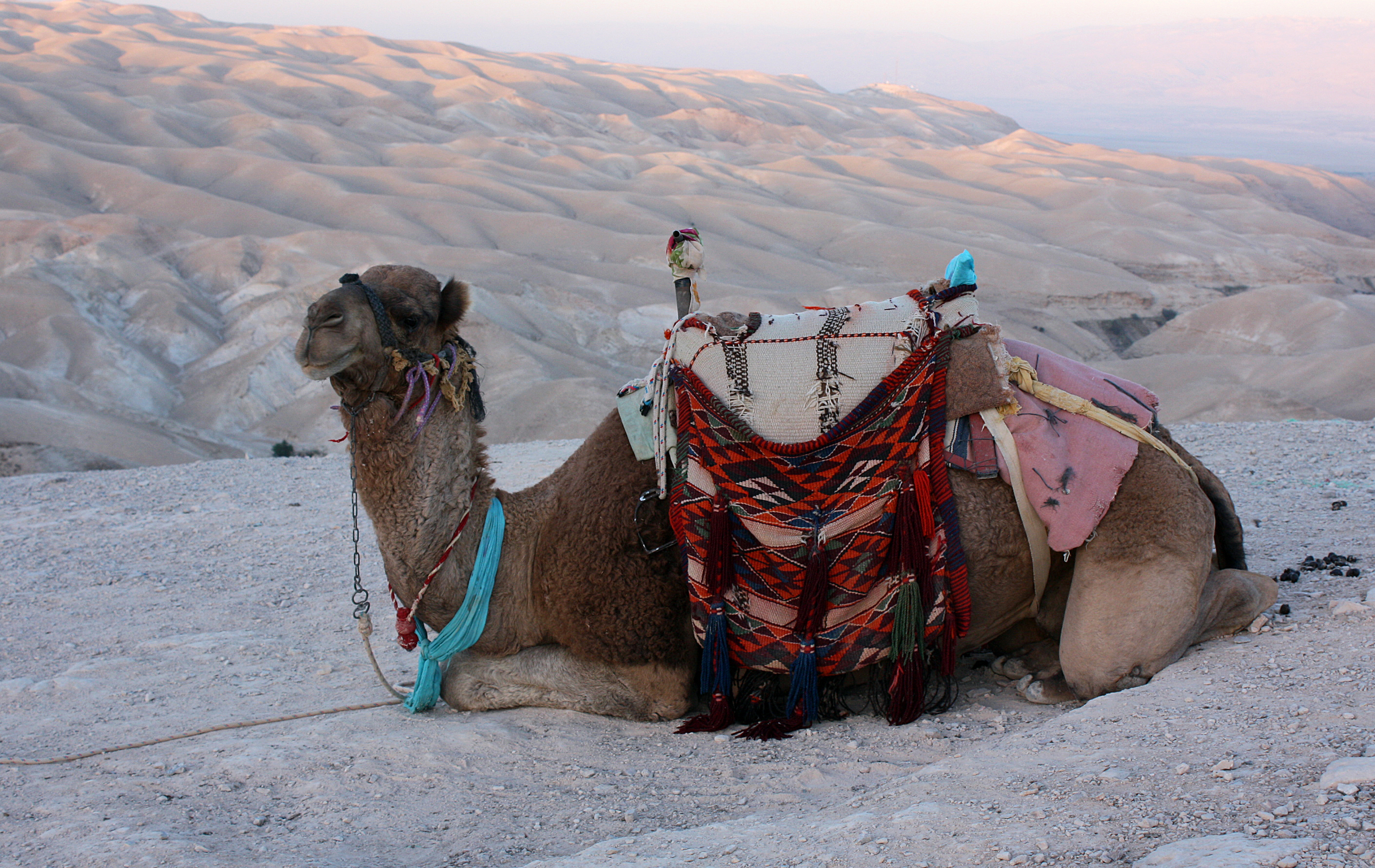
A camel decorated for a tourist camel ride in the Judean Desert

The ideal age to start training dromedaries for riding is three years, although they may be stubborn and unruly. At first the camel's head is controlled, and it is later trained to respond to sitting and standing commands, and to allow mounting. At this stage a camel will often try to escape when a trainer tries to mount it. The next stage involves training it to respond to reins. The animal must be given loads gradually and not forced to carry heavy loads before the age of six. Riding camels should not be struck on their necks, rather they should be struck behind the right leg of the rider. Leese described two types of saddles generally used in camel riding: the Arabian markloofa used by single riders and the Indian pakra used when two riders mount the same camel.

=== Baggage and draught camels ===
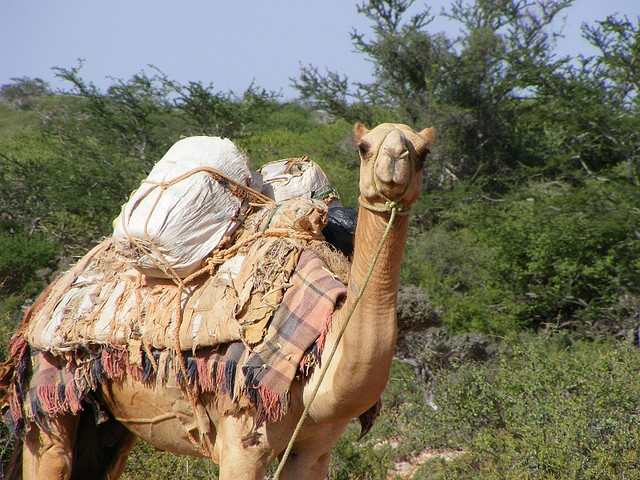
Camel carrying supplies on its back in Eyl, Puntland, Somalia

The baggage camel should be robust and heavy. Studies have recommended the camel should have either a small or a large head with a narrow aquiline nose, prominent eyes and large lips. The neck should be medium to long so the head is held high. The chest should be deep and the hump should be well-developed with sufficient space behind it to accommodate the saddle. The hindlegs should be heavy, muscular and sturdy. The dromedary can be trained to carry baggage from the age of five years, but must not be given heavy loads before the age of six. The hawia is a typical baggage saddle from Sudan. The methods of training the baggage camels are similar to those for riding camels.

Draught camels are used for several purposes including ploughing, processing in oil mills and pulling carts. There is no clear description for the ideal draught camel, though its strength, its ability to survive without water and the flatness of its feet could be indicators. It may be used for ploughing in pairs or in groups with buffaloes or bullocks. The draught camel can plough at around 2.5 km/h (1.6 mph), and should not be used for more than six hours a day – four hours in the morning and two in the afternoon. The camel is not easily exhausted unless diseased or undernourished, and has remarkable endurance and hardiness.

=== Dairy products ===
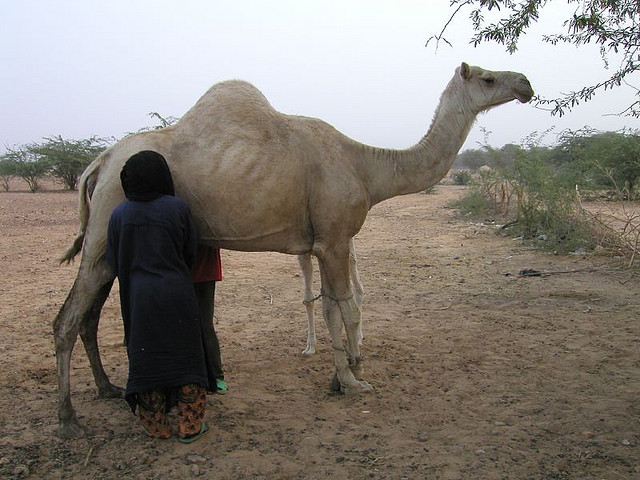
Dromedary being milked in Niger

Camel milk is a staple food of nomadic tribes living in deserts. It consists of 11.7% solids, 3% protein, 3.6% fat, 0.8% ash, 4.4% lactose and 0.13% acidity (pH 6.5). The quantities of sodium, potassium, zinc, iron, copper, manganese, niacin and vitamin C were relatively higher than the amounts in cow milk. However, the levels of thiamin, riboflavin, folacin, vitamin B_{12}, pantothenic acid, vitamin A, lysine, and tryptophan were lower than those in cow milk. The molar percentages of the fatty acids in milk fat were 26.7% for palmitic acid, 25.5% oleic acid, 11.4% myristic acid and 11% palmitoleic acid. Camel milk has higher thermal stability compared with cow milk, but it does not compare favourably with sheep milk.

Daily milk yield generally varies from 3.5 to 35 kg (7.7 to 77.2 lb) and from 1.3% to 7.8% of the body weight. Milk yield varies geographically and depends upon the animals' diet and living conditions. At the peak of lactation, a healthy female would typically provide 9 kg (20 lb) milk per day. Leese estimated a lactating female would yield 4 to 9 L (0.88 to 1.98 imp gal) besides the amount ingested by the calf. The Pakistani dromedary, which is considered a better milker and bigger, can yield 9.1–14.1 kg (20–31 lb) when well-fed. Dromedaries in Somalia may be milked between two and four times a day, while those in Afar, Ethiopia, may be milked up to seven times a day.

The acidity of dromedary milk stored at 30 °C (86 °F) increases at a slower rate than that of cow milk. Though the preparation of butter from dromedary milk is difficult, it is produced in small amounts by nomads, optimized at 22.5% fat in the cream. In 2001, the ability of dromedary milk to form curd was studied; coagulation did not show curd formation, and had a pH of 4.4. It was much different from curd produced from cow milk, and had a fragile, heterogeneous composition probably composed of casein flakes. Nevertheless, cheese and other dairy products can be made from camel milk. A study found bovine calf rennet could be used to coagulate dromedary milk. A special factory has been set up in Nouakchott to pasteurise and make cheese from camel milk. Mystical beliefs surround the use of camel milk in some places; for example, it may be used as an aphrodisiac in Ethiopia.

=== Meat ===
The meat of a five-year-old dromedary has a typical composition of 76% water, 22% protein, 1% fat, and 1% ash. The carcass, weighing 141–310 kg (311–683 lb) for a five-year-old dromedary, is composed of nearly 57% muscle, 26% bone and 17% fat. A seven-to-eight-year-old camel can produce a carcass of 125–400 kg (276–882 lb). The meat is bright red to a dark brown or maroon, while the fat is white. It has the taste and texture of beef. A study of the meat of Iranian dromedaries showed its high glycogen content, which makes it taste sweet like horse meat. The carcasses of well-fed camels were found to be covered with a thin layer of good quality fat. In a study of the fatty acid composition of raw meat taken from the hind legs of seven one-to-three years old males, 51.5% of the fatty acids were saturated, 29.9% mono-unsaturated, and 18.6% polyunsaturated. The major fatty acids in the meat were palmitic acid (26.0%), oleic acid (18.9%) and linoleic acid (12.1%). In the hump, palmitic acid was dominant (34.4%), followed by oleic acid (28.2%), myristic acid (10.3%) and stearic acid (10%).

Dromedary slaughter is more difficult than the slaughter of other domestic livestock because of its size and the significant manual work involved. More males than females are slaughtered. Though less affected by mishandling than other livestock, the pre-slaughter handling of the dromedary plays a crucial role in determining the quality of meat obtained; mishandling can often disfigure the hump. The animal is stunned, seated in a crouching position with the head in a caudal position and slaughtered. The dressing percentage of the mass of the dromedary that forms the carcass is 55–70%, more than of cattle. Camel meat is often eaten by African camel herders, who use it only during severe food scarcity or for rituals.

Camel meat is processed into food items, such as burgers, patties, sausages and shawarma. Dromedaries can be slaughtered between four and ten years of age. As the animal ages, the meat grows tougher and deteriorates in taste and quality.

A 2005 report issued jointly by the Ministry of Health (Saudi Arabia) and the United States Centers for Disease Control and Prevention details five cases of bubonic plague in humans resulting from the ingestion of raw camel liver. Four of the five patients had severe pharyngitis and submandibular lymphadenitis. Yersinia pestis was isolated from the camel's bone marrow, from the jird (Meriones libycus) and from fleas (Xenopsylla cheopis) captured at the camel's corral.

=== Camel hair, wool and hides ===
Camels in hot climates generally do not develop long coats. Camel hair is light, and has low thermal conductivity and durability, and is thus suitable for manufacturing warm clothes, blankets, tents, and rugs. Hair of highest quality is typically obtained from juvenile or feral camels. In India, camels are clipped usually in spring and around 1–1.5 kg (2.2–3.3 lb) hair is produced per clipping. In colder regions one clipping can yield as much as 5.4 kg (12 lb). A dromedary can produce 1 kg (2.2 lb) wool per year, whereas a Bactrian camel has an annual yield of nearly 5–12 kg (11–26 lb). Dromedaries under the age of two years have a fine undercoat that tends to fall off and should be cropped by hand. Little information about camel hides has been collected but they are usually of inferior quality and are less preferred for manufacturing leather.

== See also ==
- Camel urine
- List of animals with humps
- National symbols of Saudi Arabia
