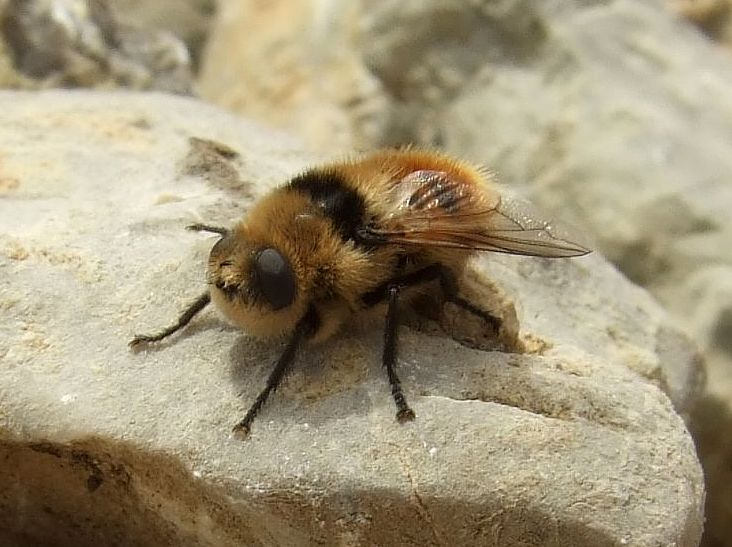
- Deer botfly (Cephenemyia stimulator)

Scientific classification
- Domain: Eukaryota
- Kingdom: Animalia
- Phylum: Arthropoda
- Class: Insecta
- Order: Diptera
- Family: Oestridae
- Subfamily: Oestrinae

Genera
- Cephenemyia; Cephalopina; Gedoelstia; Kirkioestrus; Oestrus; Pharyngobolus; Pharyngomyia; Rhinoestrus; Tracheomyia

= Oestrinae =

Subfamily of flies

Oestrinae is a subfamily of Oestridae which includes parasitic flies attacking a range of different hosts. There are 9 genera with 34 species in this subfamily, which typically spend their larval stage in the skin or soft tissues of mammals, including deer or sheep (such species are often considered pests). The adult flies give birth to living larva in the host's nostril.
