= Bracy Clark =

English veterinarian

Bracy Clark (1771 – 16 December 1860) was an English veterinary surgeon specialising in the horse.

== Biography ==
He was the youngest son of John and Hannah Clark of Chipping Norton, and was educated at the Quaker school of Thomas Huntley at Burford in Oxfordshire. He was one of the first students enrolled at the newly established Veterinary College of London, and studied under Charles Benoît Vial de Sainbel. Sainbel died of unidentified fever in 1793 (later thought to be glanders); Clark disregarded the instructions to stay clear of the body, to produce a death mask.

Clark made a continental tour around 1797, but wartime conditions meant he wasn't able to visit France. He was then in a London veterinary practice with William Moorcroft and Edmund Bond.

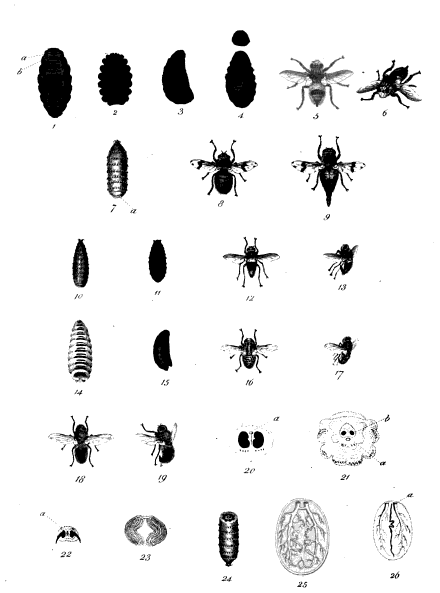
Plate of genus Oestrus, from a 1797 paper by Bracy Clark in the Transactions of the Linnean Society.

Clark specialised in conditions of horses' hooves, and in 1806 patented a new pattern horse shoe; he was then in practice at Giltspur Street, London. He wrote extensively about the hoof in a series of pamphlets and books. In his work on the hoof Clark concluded that great damage was done by the shoeing practices of the time, but his views were ridiculed by his contemporaries. In those opinions he was following, however, the teaching of Edward Coleman, Sainbel's successor. His writings on laminitis and bridles have been noted by modern writers on barefoot horses and the bitless bridle.

An advertisement for his books, published in 1835, records that he was a Fellow of the Linnean Society, Member of the Institut de France and Ecole de Médicine, and of the Royal Societies of Berlin, Frankfort, Copenhagen, and Stuttgart. He was made an Honorary Member of the Natural History Society of New York in 1817. He lived at 7, Taunton Place, Regent's Park. Carl August Dohrn, investigating the fate of part of the Linnean Collection that passed to James Edward Smith, described Clark in 1851 as the last survivor of Smith's friends.

== Works ==
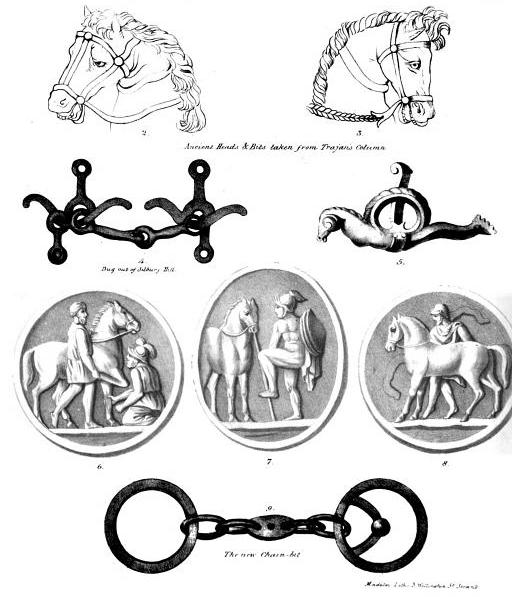
Illustrations from Bracy Clark, A Treatise on the Bits of Horses Chalinologia (1835).

- A Description of Plate the First, exhibiting a longitudinal section of the head of the horse, of its natural size [With "Description of Plate the Second, etc"], 1805
- A Section of the Horse, 1807.
- A series of original experiments on the foot of the living horse, exhibiting the changes produced by shoeing, and the causes of the apparent mystery of this art, 1809
- Index to the Sectional Figure of the Horse, with remarks on certain properties of his general framing, 1813.
- On Casting Horses; with a description of the new casting hobbles, invented by B Clark With a plate, etc., 1814.
- An Essay on the Bots of Horses, and other animals, 1815.
- An Essay on the Gripes of Horses (Directions with the Gripe Tincture), 1816
- Recherches sur la construction du sabot du cheval, et suite d'experiences sur les effets de la ferrure Ouvrage traduit de l'anglais et revu par l'auteur, etc, 1817
- A New Exposition of the Horse's Hoof [Signed: B C, i.e. Bracy Clark], 1820
- An Essay on the Cause and Cure of Running Frush in Horses' Feet (On Ossified Cartilages of the Feet, vulgo Ring-Bones), 1821
- An Essay on the Canker and Corns in Horses' Feet, 1822.
- A Short History of the Horse, and of the Progress of Horse-Knowledge, 1824.
- On the Knowledge of the Age of the Horse by his Teeth With remarks [With a table], 1826.
- A Description of a New Horse Shoe which expands to the Foot Invented by B Clark With some account of its application and advantages, being an appendix to the Stereoplea, 1827
- Description of the Distender, or Spreader, used in putting on the expansion shoes to the feet of horses, 1827
- Testimonies communicated by Various Persons in favor of the Expansion Shoe [Edited by B Clark], 1828.
- Hippodonomia, or the True structure, laws, and economy of the horse's foot: also Podophthora, or a ruinous defect in the principles of the common shoe detected; and demonstrated by experiments: with a proposition for a new principle of shoeing Second edition, enlarged and improved, 1829
- Remarks on French Shoeing, by an English Shoeing Smith [subscribed, Menalcas; being a review of a work by J Goodwin entitled: "The King's Farrier"], 1830?
- Guide to the Shoeing-Forge, or Plain directions to gentlemen going to have their horses shod, etc, 1830
- On the Usages of the Ancients respecting Shoeing the Horse Second edition,1831.
- The Cholera unmasked; or its True name, nature, and causes pointed out; also a more consistent and successful mode of treating it Corrected from a communication formerly addressed to the editors of the Medical Gazette (Part II of a Dissertation on the Epidemic Cholera), 1832
- Stereoplea, or the Artificial defence of the horse's hoof considered, 1832
- Inflammation of the lungs, Pneumonia, or Pneumonitis [in horses], 1833?
- Pharmacopoeia Equina; or, New pharmacopoeia for horses1833.
- No 5 On Founder-Pedicida, 1834?
- On Crackt-Hoof and its Cure, 1834
- A Treatise on the Bits of Horses Chalinologia Second edition [With plates], 1835.
- A short history of the celebrated race-horse Eclipse, 1835
- An Enumeration of the apparatus necessary for making the new tablet shoe of expansion, 1836
- Broken Wind Pneumarox' Broken wind is a disease frequently happening to horses, etc 1837?
- A Recommendation to Farriers and Shoeing Smiths, throughout the United Kingdom of Great Britain, in respect to the injurious practice of slicing and cutting away the horn from the frogs of horses' feet, 1837
- A Description of two ancient Horseshoes, found near Silbury Hill in Wiltshire, 1837
- On the Vices of Horses by B C [i.e. Bracy Clark], 1839.
- Disorders of the Foot of the Horse, 1839.
- On the Conditioning of Horses Hippocomia, 1840?
- Vices of Horses On the shying and startlish horse, 1840?
- An Appendix or Supplement to a Treatise on the OEstri and Cuterebrae of various Animals [i.e. to "An Essay on the Bots of Horses"] [Extracted from the "Transactions of the Linnean Society" With "Addenda 1848"] 1841
- Original Remarks on the General Framing of the Horse Illustrated by plates by B C [i.e. Bracy Clark] Second edition, 1842.
- On running Frush of horses' feet [By B Clark] Third edition, 1842
- Some Account of the Circulation of the Blood in the Foot of the Horse by B C [i.e. Bracy Clark], 1842
- Ring-Bones, or Ossified Cartilages Second edition 1842
- Remarks with illustrations of the eroded Shuttle or Nut-bone (os nuciforme) of the horse's foot, 1842?
- An Exposure of the Corruption of the Saxon Name Arm's Housen into Alms Houses; and of some other Norman corruptions By B C, Vestryman of Mary-le-Bone, 1844
- Description of an Economical and Useful Stove for Warming Rooms and other purposes, invented by B Clark, 1844?
- The Foot of the Horse: its true nature, structure, laws, & economy explained To which are added observations on the ruinous effects of the principle involved in the ordinary shoe; and a treatise on the new principle of expansion shoeing, 1870

He was listed as a contributor to Rees's Cyclopædia. Articles attributed to him include "Anatomy of the Horse", "Bits", "Bleeding", "Blindness" etc.
