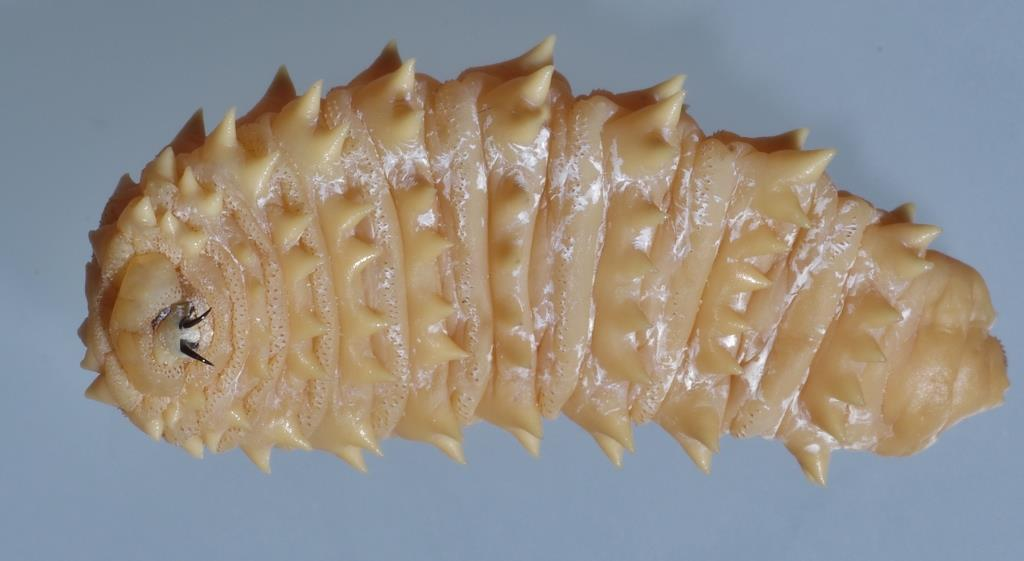
- Larva

Scientific classification
- Kingdom: Animalia
- Phylum: Arthropoda
- Clade: Pancrustacea
- Class: Insecta
- Order: Diptera
- Family: Oestridae
- Subfamily: Oestrinae
- Genus: Cephalopina; Strand, 1928
- Species: C. titillator

Binomial name
- Cephalopina titillator (Clark, 1816)

= Cephalopina =

Genus of flies

Cephalopina titillator is a species of fly in the family Oestridae. It is the only species in the genus Cephalopina. It is a nasal bot fly of dromedaries.
