= Rhinoestrus =

Scientific classification
- Domain: Eukaryota
- Kingdom: Animalia
- Phylum: Arthropoda
- Class: Insecta
- Order: Diptera
- Family: Oestridae
- Genus: Rhinoestrus; Brauer, 1886

Genus of flies

Rhinoestrus is a genus of flies belonging to the family Oestridae.

The species of this genus are found in Southern Africa.

Species:

- Rhinoestrus antidorcitis Zumpt & Bauristhene, 1962
- Rhinoestrus giraffae Zumpt, 1965
- Rhinoestrus hippopotami Grunberg, 1904
- Rhinoestrus latifrons Gan, 1947
- Rhinoestrus nivarleti Rodhain & Bequaert, 1912
- Rhinoestrus phacochoeri Rodhain & Bequaert, 1915
- Rhinoestrus purpureus (Brauer, 1858)
- Rhinoestrus steyni Zumpt, 1958
- Rhinoestrus tshernyshevi Grunin, 1951
- Rhinoestrus usbekistanicus Gan, 1947
- Rhinoestrus vanzyli Zumpt & Bauristhene, 1962
