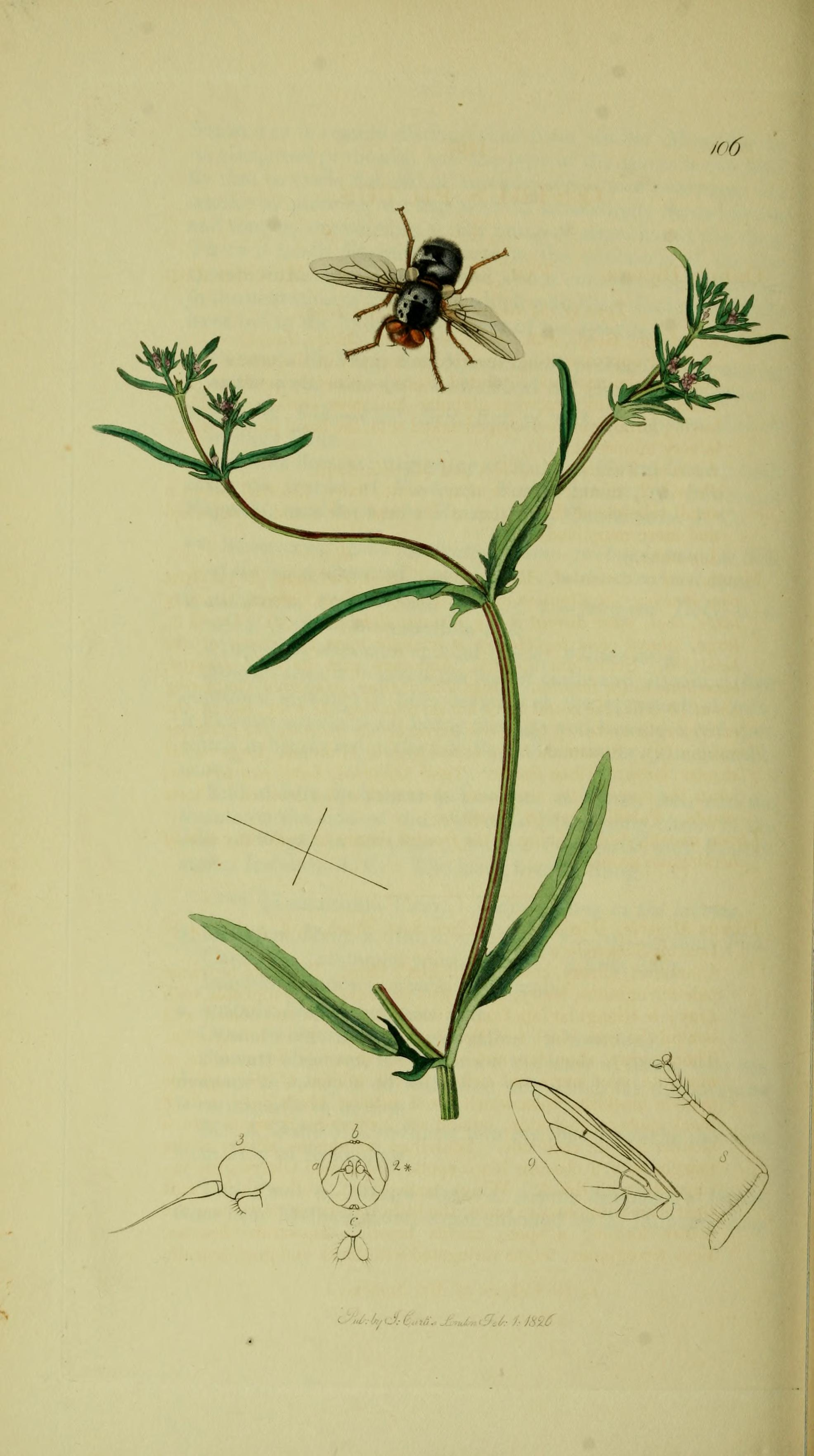
- Pharyngomyia picta

Scientific classification
- Domain: Eukaryota
- Kingdom: Animalia
- Phylum: Arthropoda
- Class: Insecta
- Order: Diptera
- Family: Oestridae
- Subfamily: Oestrinae
- Tribe: Cephenemyiini

Genera
- Cephenemyia; Pharyngomyia

= Cephenemyiini =

Tribe of insects

Cephenemyiini is a tribe within the family Oestridae which includes large flies, parasitic on deer and related ungulates.

- Tribe Cephenemyiini
  - Genus Cephenemyia Latreille, 1818

  - C. apicata Bennett and Sabrosky, 1962
  - C. auribarbis (Meigen, 1824)
  - C. grandis
  - C. jellisoni Townsend, 1941
  - C. kaplanovi
  - C. macrostis Brauer, 1863
  - C. phobifer (Clark, 1815)
  - C. pratti (Clark, 1815)
  - C. stimulator Hunter, 1916
  - C. trompe (Modeer, 1786)
  - C. ulrichii Brauer, 1863

  - Genus Pharyngomyia Schiner, 1861

  - P. picta (Meigen, 1824)
