= Jellisoni =

Jellisoni may refer to:

- Cephenemyia jellisoni, species of nose bot fly
- Cuterebra jellisoni, species of new world skin bot fly
