= Hypodermin C =

Identifiers
- EC no.: 3.4.21.49
- CAS no.: 122191-36-0

Databases
- IntEnz: IntEnz view
- BRENDA: BRENDA entry
- ExPASy: NiceZyme view
- KEGG: KEGG entry
- MetaCyc: metabolic pathway
- PRIAM: profile
- PDB structures: RCSB PDB PDBe PDBsum
Search
- PMC: articles
- PubMed: articles
- NCBI: proteins

Hypodermin C (EC 3.4.21.49, Hypoderma collagenase) is an enzyme. This enzyme catalyses the following chemical reaction

Hydrolysis of proteins including native collagen at -Ala bond leaving an N-terminal (75%) and a C-terminal (25%) fragment

This enzyme is isolated from the larva of a warble fly, Hypoderma lineatum.
