= Cordylobia rodhaini =

Scientific classification
- Kingdom: Animalia
- Phylum: Arthropoda
- Class: Insecta
- Order: Diptera
- Family: Calliphoridae
- Genus: Cordylobia
- Species: C. rodhaini

Binomial name
- Cordylobia rodhaini Gedoelst, 1910

Synonyms
- Cordylobia ebadiana Lehrer & Goergen, 2006

Species of fly

Cordylobia rodhaini, also known as the Lund's fly, derived its common name from captain Lund, who was the first European to show symptoms of the disease caused by the larvae of the same fly. Lund's fly belongs to the genus Cordylobia, flies from the family Calliphoridae. The larvae of the Lund's fly are parasites of thinned-skinned mammals, especially the Gambian rat, mona monkey and small antelopes and are only accidental parasites of humans. The adult flies feeds on rotting fruits, vegetables and animal feces, and are most abundant in the wet season. Like many tropical insects they are most active in the dark periods and have the greatest activity early in the morning and late in the evening while resting typically between 8am to 5pm. The Lund's fly are largely confined to tropical Africa, especially the rainforest areas in Sub-Saharan Africa. As a result of human migration, though, the parasitic infections they cause have been recorded in other continents, including Europe and Asia.

== Life cycle ==
The life cycle of Lund's fly typically lasts from 55 to 67 days. The female fly lays up to 500 eggs and deposits her eggs on dry sand polluted with the excrement of animals, or can also lay them on human clothing. In about three days, the larva attached to its host, is then activated by the warm body of the host. The larva then hatches and breaks through the skin. A maturing larva induces a painful swelling. In about 12 to 15 days, the larva reaches a length of about 23 mm, exits the skin of the host, and falls to the ground to pupate. The adult fly emerges in 23 to 26 days, and the life cycle continues.

=== Larval structure ===
Lund's fly is parasitic at its larval stage. Under examination with a scanning electron microscope, it appears whitish and barrel-shaped, with 11 segments. Its body is almost completely covered by large cone-shaped spines. These spines serve as a point of attachment to its host. The larvae have a brown apex, pointing towards the posterior end where fewer spines occur. Two bulges exist in the anterior end with paired mouth hooks at the anterior end of the larvae. After hatching, the larvae penetrate into the dermis and molt to second- and third-instar larvae before emerging from the skin. The third-instar larvae have an approximate length of 1.5 cm and are distinctively less elongated and conical in shape, compared to the second-instar larvae.

== Lund's fly-induced myiasis ==
Myiasis is generally defined as the infestation of animal tissue by the larvae of some flies. The larvae of myiasis-causing flies feed on animal tissue and/or bodily fluids. Myiasis caused by Lund's fly larvae have been reported in Ethiopia, Uganda, Congo, Kenya, Ghana, and Cameroon. It is very similar to the myiasis that caused by the tumbu fly, the latter co-existing in the same geographical regions as Lund's fly. Clinical symptoms start with the formation of a red papule, which is characterized by a small raised swollen area of the skin. These can form on any area of the skin, with the arms, legs, arms, and back most frequently affected. Patients typically do not report pain at this stage of infection. The papule enlarges with time, penetrates deep into the skin, and develops a central opening, now classified as a furuncle. The central opening facilitates gaseous exchange for the larva while a serous fluid also exits the same opening. The central opening also makes it possible for the larva to excrete its fecal matter. At this point, itching and burning sensation are usually described by patients in the affected areas of the skin. Patients also report symptoms such as insomnia (due to pains at night) and fatigue. The disease is usually self-limiting as the larva drops out, upon reaching the third-instar larval stage. Also, Lund's fly larvae infestation in systemic areas, such as the internal organs, or blood vessels, has not been reported. The most serious incident of Lund's fly-induced myiasis reported so far resulted in swelling of the lymph nodes due to adverse immune reactions in the patient. A major distinction between myiasis caused by Lund's fly and that caused by other flies is that lesions in Lund's fly myiasis are usually smaller and multiple. Myiasis caused by tumbu fly is, though, similar to that caused by Lund's fly; the two flies belong to the same genus and share similar characteristics.

=== Treatment ===
As the larvae fall off eventually, the disease is self-limiting and no treatment is usually needed, but to facilitate healing, the larvae can be physically removed from the infected region. This is done by applying gentle manual pressure to any two ends of the lesion until the larvae come out Occasionally, petroleum jelly or oil is applied to the opening in the lesion, to reduce oxygen supply to the larvae, thereby forcing them to move closer to the surface. Improper removal of the larvae could lead to inflammation of the lymph nodes as bursting of the fluid from the larvae could lead to allergic reactions in some people. Proper covering of the wound prevents further infection. Unsterilized objects should not be used to open lesions, as this could result in infection. Hyperpigmentation may persist on the skin of the infected area months after infection. Also, lack of experience in diagnosing Lund's fly-induced myiasis could lead to a misdiagnosis of impetigo, insect bites, folliculitis, or other skin disorders.

=== Prevention and control ===
Generally, humans are accidental hosts of myiasis as a result of Lund's fly larvae infestation, so are less likely to be infected. Infestation can pose a health problem, though, for the local population in the endemic region and tourists alike. Infestations of Lund's fly larvae are usually diagnosed in tourists and foreign workers who previously travelled to the endemic regions. Therefore, incidence rates might be under-reported in endemic regions, and might be treated by local means. Even as it can be spread by human travel, it has not reported to be contagious and is also less likely to thrive in regions other than sub-Saharan Africa, due to differences in climate. As eggs are usually laid on wet clothing in endemic regions, clothes should not be left outside for long periods, specifically at dawn or twilight, as this is when Lund's flies are most active and likely to lay eggs. Also, ironing all clothes to kill eggs or larvae can help to reduce the incidence of myiasis. Good hygiene can also play a role in preventing myiasis, as Lund's flies are known to feed in dirty surroundings and lay eggs where they breed.
