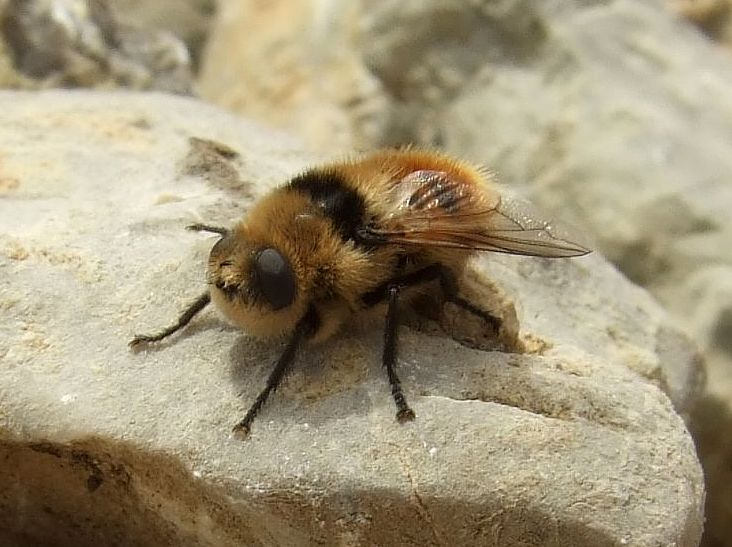
- Deer botfly (Cephenemyia stimulator)

Scientific classification
- Kingdom: Animalia
- Phylum: Arthropoda
- Clade: Pancrustacea
- Class: Insecta
- Order: Diptera
- Family: Oestridae
- Tribe: Cephenemyiini
- Genus: Cephenemyia; Latreille, 1818

Species
- C. albina (Taber & Fleenor, 2004); C. apicata (Bennett and Sabrosky, 1962); C. auribarbis (Meigen, 1824); C. jellisoni (Townsend, 1941); C. kaplanovi (Grunin, 1947); C. macrostis (Brauer, 1863); C. phobifer (Clark, 1815); C. pratti (Clark, 1815); C. stimulator (Hunter, 1916); C. trompe (Modeer, 1786); C. ulrichii (Brauer, 1863)

Synonyms
- Cephenemya(Robineau-Desvoidy, 1830); Cephenomyia (Agassiz, 1846); Endocephala (Lioy, 1864); Coephalomyia (Rondani, 1868); Cephalemya (Curran, 1934); Acrocomyia (Papavero, 1977); Procephenemyia (Papavero, 1977)

= Deer botfly =

Genus of flies

The name deer botfly (also deer nose botfly) refers to any species in the genus Cephenemyia (sometimes misspelled as Cephenomyia or Cephenemya), within the family Oestridae. They are large, gray-brown flies, often very accurate mimics of bumblebees. They attack chiefly the nostrils and pharyngeal cavity of members of the deer family. The larva of Cephenemyia auribarbis, infesting the stag, is called a stagworm. The genus name comes from the Greek kēphēn, meaning 'drone bee', and myia, meaning 'fly'.

== Description ==
The larval stages of Cephenemyia are obligate parasites of cervids. Eggs hatch in the uterus of the female fly. She then flies close to the head of her host species and while hovering ejects her larvae into its nostrils. Larvae migrate to the base of the animal's tongue, where they mature in clusters to a size of 25 to 36 mm (0.98 to 1.42 in). After being ejected by the host, they pupate in soil (2 to 3 weeks) before emerging as a sexually-mature but non-feeding adult, which must quickly find a mate, since their lifespan is short.

Aristotle (384 BC–322 BC) described deer botfly larvae as follows:

However, without any exception, stags are found to have maggots living inside the head, and the habitat of these creatures is in the hollow underneath the root of the tongue and in the neighbourhood of the vertebra to which the head is attached. These creatures are as large as the largest grubs; they grow all together in a cluster, and they are usually about twenty in number.

— Aristotle, History of Animals

== Distribution ==
Species found in the United States include C. apicata, C. jellisoni, C. phobifer, C. pratti, and C. trompe.

In Scandinavia, the only species present are C. trompe, C. ulrichii, and C. stimulator. Other European species include C. auribarbis and C. pratti.

== Flying speed ==
It was reported for many years that Cephenemyia was the fastest of all flying insects, cited by The New York Times and Guinness Book of World Records as traveling at speeds of over 800 miles per hour (1,300 km/h). (For comparison, the speed of sound in air is 768 mph (1,236 km/h).) The source of this extraordinary claim was an article by entomologist Charles Henry Tyler Townsend in the 1927 Journal of the New York Entomological Society, wherein Townsend claimed to have estimated a speed of 400 yards per second while observing Cephenemyia pratti at 12,000 feet (3,700 m) in New Mexico.

In 1938 Irving Langmuir, recipient of the 1932 Nobel Prize in Chemistry, examined the claim in detail and refuted the estimate. Among his specific criticisms were:

- To maintain a velocity of 800 miles per hour, the 0.3-gram (0.011 oz) fly would have had to consume more than 150% of its body weight in food every second;
- The fly would have produced an audible sonic boom;
- The supersonic fly would have been invisible to the naked eye; and
- The impact trauma of such a fly colliding with a human body would resemble that of a gunshot wound.

Using the original report as a basis, Langmuir estimated the deer botfly's true speed at a more plausible 25 mph (40 km/h). Time magazine published an article in 1938 debunking Townsend's calculations.
