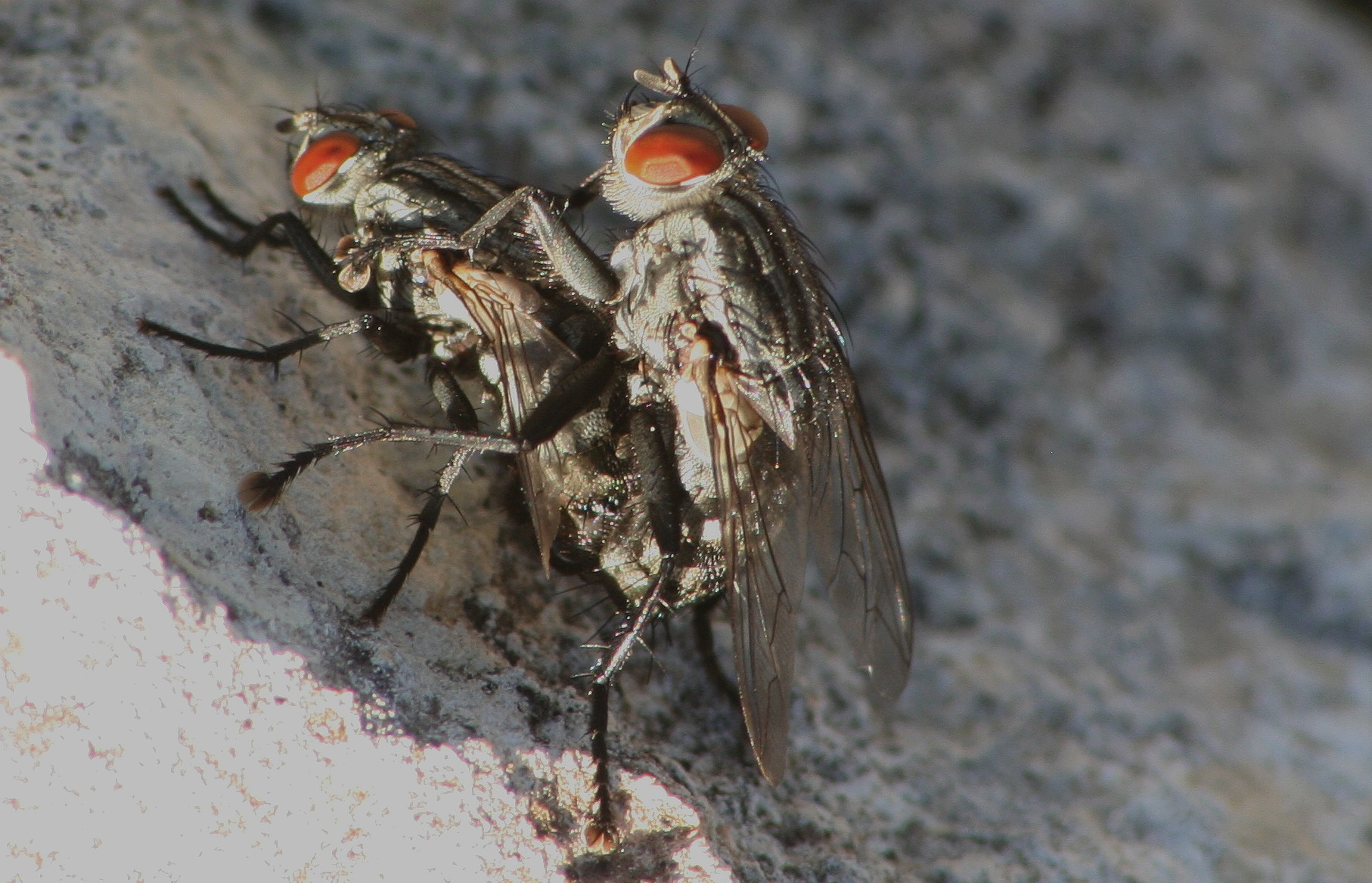

Scientific classification
- Kingdom: Animalia
- Phylum: Arthropoda
- Class: Insecta
- Order: Diptera
- Family: Sarcophagidae
- Genus: Sarcophaga
- Species: S. barbata

Binomial name
- Sarcophaga barbata Thomson, 1869

Synonyms
- Sarcophaga argyrostoma (Robineau-Desvoidy, 1830); Sarcophaga argentina (Brethes, 1916); Sarcophaga chivensis (Zimin, 1928); Sarcophaga falculata (Pandelle, 1896); Sarcophaga persicae (Senior-White, 1924); Mesothyrsia henschiana (Enderlein, 1928); Myophora argyrostoma (Robineau-Desvoidy, 1830); Ptilocnema henseliana (Enderlein, 1928)

= Sarcophaga barbata =

Fly species

Sarcophaga barbata is a species from the genus Sarcophaga and the family of flesh fly, Sarcophagidae. It is most closely related to S. plinthopyga, S. securifera, and S. bullata of the same genus. The species was first discovered by Eugene Thomson in 1868. S. barbata has also been found in the Middle East near carcasses, where the larvae can thrive. S. barbata is also a prominent organism in scientific research and has been used to study L-3-glycerophosphate oxidation and location within the mitochondria .

== Morphology ==
The body of S. barbata is grey in color, spanning from 10 to 14 mm in length. S. barbata has red compound eyes. Its thorax displays three prominent black stripes, with another less distinct stripe on each side. Its abdomen is smaller in width than the thorax and has four sections, featuring a checkerboard pattern. Two scales are found at the base of edge of the species' wings, called epaulet and subepaulet. The epaulet is situated close to the thorax and usually black, while the subepaulet is located further out and white in color. The distinction of these scales is what separates it from other members of its family.

Male S. barbata are on average smaller than the females and have stripes that are closer together. Below the section of the abdomen, males have the hypopygium, which is the genital segments. At the end of the genital segments is the anus, which is flanked by two curved forceps that lack lateral motion. The triangular accessory plate lies just outside of the forceps with the posterior and anterior claspers near the median of the plate. The two-jointed penis is located between the claspers next to the forceps. Males also possess combs on their hind legs composed of a close arrangement of short, blunt bristles. These combs are a distinctive feature of males.

== Distribution and habitat ==
Sarcophaga barbata can be found in North American and the Middle East year round. These flies prefer areas with direct sunlight and warmer climates. S. barbata are usually found in dead and rotting meat and animal excrement, which are prime environments for them. This is because their larvae are facultative parasites, as they feed on organic tissue and use the hosts' oxygen reserve. Such parasitic feeding causes dermal myiasis in humans and animals.

== Life cycle ==
The life cycle of S. barbata takes between 12 and 60 days. It involves the larva stage, the pupa stage, and the adult stage. The fly is viviparous, which means the female gives birth directly to live maggots, the larvae, as opposed to giving birth to eggs that later form into larvae.

=== Embryo ===
The embryo develops inside the female body and is deposited through the ovipositor into the food source, which is usually decaying meat or animal excrement, with a still intact egg membrane. Some of the deposits might be unfertilized eggs and thus will degrade into the food source. The larvae will remain in their egg membranes until they are totally developed, at which point they will break out and begin to feed.

=== Larva ===
Fully developed larvae tend to be about 3.6 mm in length and of normal musocid shape. The smallest width is at the anterior end and tapers out reaching a stable cylindrical shape in the middle. The anal and genital areas are still not fully developed and are less prominent, but they have developed tubercles. The larvae contains irregularly spaced spines that form rings at the posterior and the anterior ends of each segment. The spine of the larvae becomes lighter closer to the posterior region while maintaining consistent color on both sides. The average female has 60 larvae, but can have as few as 6 larvae.

=== Pupa ===
The pupa puffs up as it develops over time. All cells of one region of the body aggregate and puff up together. However, there is no synchrony between regions of the body. The thoracic region puffs up one day before the abdominal region. This puffing pattern is related to the development of the pupa and is not hormonally controlled. After the pupa is fully developed and after eclosion has occurred, the cuticle of the newly emerged fly is darkened, which requires a hormonal cue that is delivered by the emergence.

== Genetics ==
The ovaries of S. barbata experiences and under-replication of rDNA resulting in half the amount of rDNA as compared to the brain. A similar result is found in Drosophila hydei, which displayed under-replication in both nurse and follicle cells. This degree of under-replication, 47%, is still less than that in polytene chromosomes of the salivary glands of Drosophila melanogaster, which is 20%. This under-replication of rDNA is in stark contrast to the oocyte nuclei of most species of animals, which show an increase rRNA synthesis during the growth period. Under-replication is thought to be a product of asynchronous replication during mitosis. This made an important contribution to scientific research because it indicated a possible energy-saving mechanism employed by certain organisms during development, which is currently being studied.

=== Eye mutation ===
Wild type S. barbata possess a red eye color, but the recessive autosomal gene ivory causes a white eye color. The mutation blocks the formylkynurenine pathway, which produces xanthommatin. Xanthomattin is a yellow-brown pigment in its primary form, and its reduced form is red, which gives the flies their red eye color. These flies can display an intermediate eye color if they ingest xanthommatin precursors. Ivory gene mutation is homologous to the D. melanogaster mutation vermillion and the M. domestica mutation green. S. barbata with ivory are less viable than wild-type.

== Spatial perception ==
An experiment to test the spatial perception of the larvae and its effect on pupation can be performed in vitro. As the larvae are placed in the test tubes to explore the container thoroughly, they relate visual cues to tactile stimuli and distinguish between a closed and an open container. If the container is open, there is no delay in pupation and the pupa faces the open end. If the container is closed, it is delayed by four to five days only because the tactile stimuli is present. Pupation delay in response to a closed container stopped after the dimensions of the container increases beyond the limit of the larvae's spatial perception.

== Relation to humans ==
=== Forensic importance ===
Sarcophaga barbata is one of the dominant necrophagous flesh fly species. Forensic entomology provides data about the interval of time that has passed postmortem and even circumstances surrounding the death. They are specifically useful since they deposit maggots directly onto the decomposing body, their larger, visible size, and difference in activity during different stages. Their main limitation, however, is due to lack of information surrounding their geographic distribution and taxonomic features.

=== Biological research ===
Sarcophaga barbata was used to study the oxidation of L-3-glycerophosphate in mitochondria. It is found that the L-3-glycerophosphate does not enter the mitochondrial matrix, unlike pyruvate. This helps locate the L-3-glycerophosphate-flavoprotein oxidoreductase, which is on the inner membrane of the mitochondria.
