= Myiasis =

Infestation of parasitic maggots

- Other names: Flystrike, blowfly strike, fly-blown
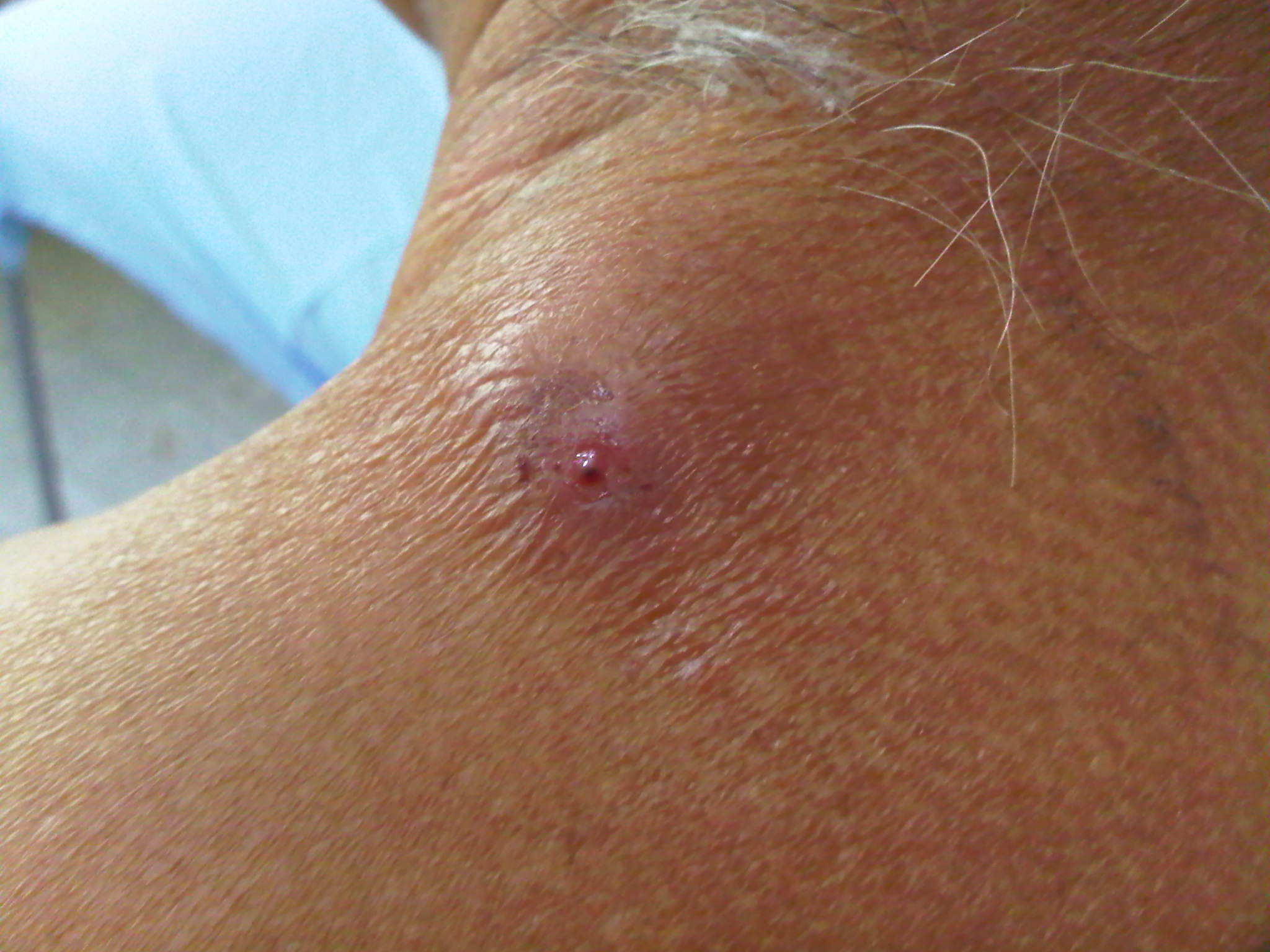
- Cutaneous myiasis in the shoulder of a human
- Pronunciation: /maɪˈaɪ.əsəs/
- Specialty: Infectious disease

Myiasis (/maɪ.ˈaɪ.ə.səs/ my-EYE-ə-səss), also known as flystrike or fly strike, is the parasitic infestation of the body of a live animal by fly larvae (maggots) that grow inside the host while feeding on its tissue. Although flies are most commonly attracted to open wounds and urine- or feces-soaked fur, some species (including the most common myiatic flies—the botfly, blowfly, and screwfly) can create an infestation even on unbroken skin. Non-myiatic flies (such as the common housefly) can be responsible for accidental myiasis.

Because some animals (particularly non-native domestic animals) cannot react as effectively as humans to the causes and effects of myiasis, such infestations present a severe and continuing problem for livestock industries worldwide, causing severe economic losses where they are not mitigated by human action. Although typically a far greater issue for animals, myiasis is also a relatively frequent disease for humans in rural tropical regions where myiatic flies thrive, and often may require medical attention to surgically remove the parasites.

Myiasis varies widely in the forms it takes and its effects on those affected. Such variations depend largely on the fly species and where the larvae are located. Some flies lay eggs in open wounds, other larvae may invade unbroken skin or enter the body through the nose or ears, and still others may be swallowed if the eggs are deposited on the lips or food. There can also be accidental myiasis that Eristalis tenax can cause in humans via water containing the larvae or in contaminated uncooked food. The name of the condition derives from ancient Greek μυῖα (myia), meaning "fly".

== Signs and symptoms ==
How myiasis affects the human body depends on where the larvae are located. Larvae may infect dead, necrotic (prematurely dying) or living tissue in various sites: the skin, eyes, ears, stomach, and intestinal tract, or in genitourinary sites. They may invade open wounds and lesions or unbroken skin. Some enter the body through the nose or ears. Larvae or eggs can reach the stomach or intestines if they are swallowed with food and cause gastric or intestinal myiasis. In extremely rare cases, maggots may occasionally infest the vulvar area.

Several different presentations of myiasis and their symptoms:

Syndrome	Symptoms
Cutaneous myiasis	Painful, slow-developing ulcers or furuncle- (boil-) like sores that can last for a prolonged period
Nasal myiasis	Obstruction of nasal passages and severe irritation. In some cases, facial edema and fever can develop. Death is not uncommon.
Aural myiasis	Crawling sensations and buzzing noises. Smelly discharge is sometimes present. If located in the middle ear, larvae may get to the brain.
Ophthalmomyiasis	Severe irritation, edema, and pain. Fairly common.

=== Wound ===
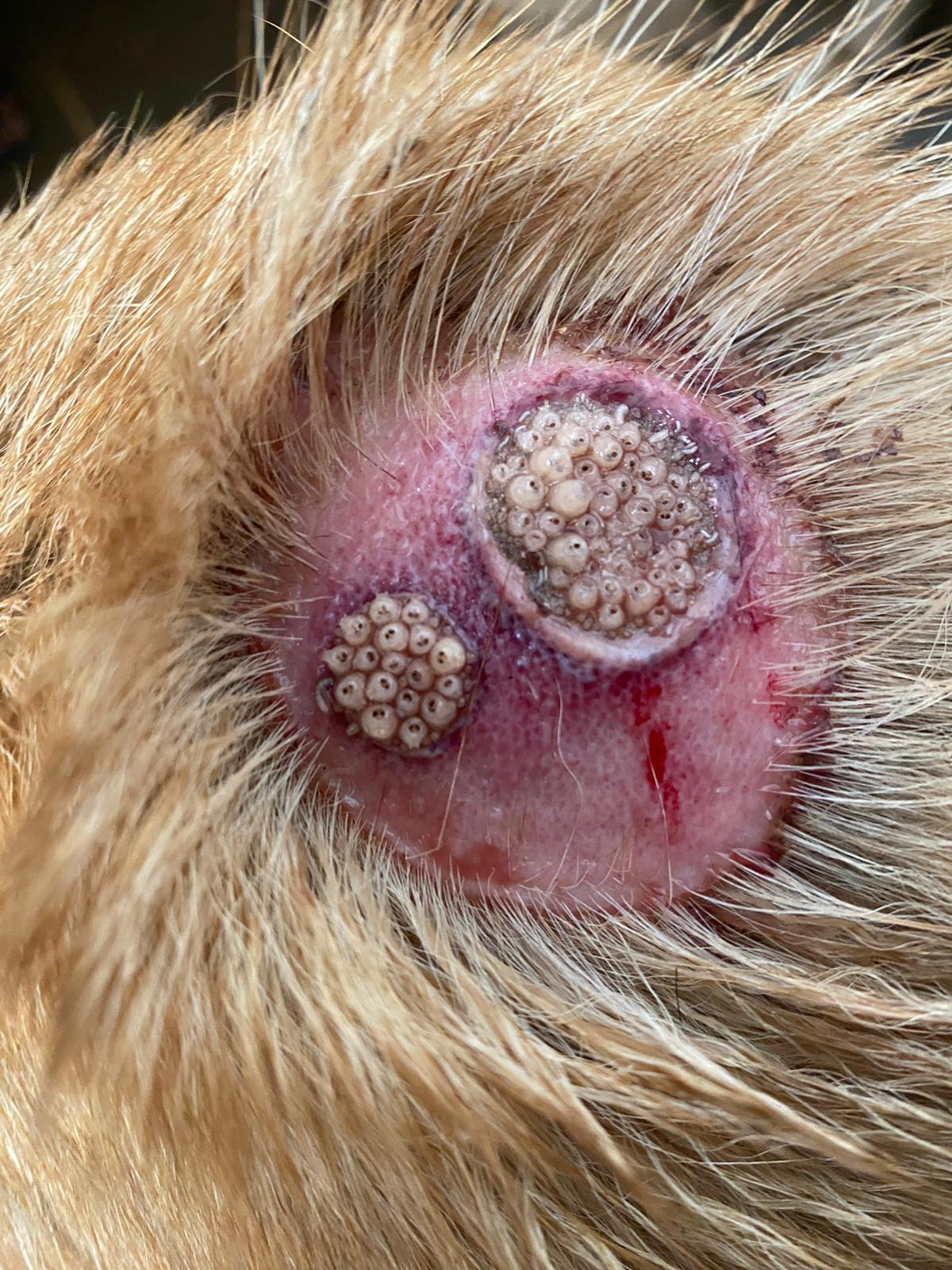
Wound myiasis in a dog, with numerous fly larvae visible within two skin lesions

Wound myiasis occurs when fly larvae infest open wounds. It has been a serious complication of war wounds in tropical areas and is sometimes seen in neglected wounds in most parts of the world. Predisposing factors include poor socioeconomic conditions, extremes of age, neglect, mental disability, psychiatric illness, alcoholism, diabetes, and vascular occlusive disease.

=== Eye ===
Myiasis of the human eye or ophthalmomyiasis can be caused by Hypoderma tarandi, a parasitic botfly of caribou. It is known to lead to uveitis, glaucoma, and retinal detachment.

== Cause ==
=== Life cycle ===
The life cycle in sheep is typical of the disease. The female flies lay their eggs on the sheep in damp, protected areas of the body that are soaked with urine and feces, mainly the sheep's breech (buttocks). It takes approximately eight hours to a day for the eggs to hatch, depending on the conditions. Once hatched, the larvae then lacerate the skin with their mouthparts, causing open sores. Once the skin has been breached, the larvae then tunnel through the sores into the host's subcutaneous tissue, causing deep and irritating lesions highly subject to infection. After about the second day, bacterial infection is likely and, if left untreated, causes bacterial bloodstream infections or sepsis. This leads to anorexia and weakness and is generally fatal if untreated.

=== Species affecting humans ===
There are three main fly families causing economically important myiasis in livestock and also, occasionally, in humans:

- Calliphoridae (blowflies)
  - Some examples include Calliphora vomitoria, Calliphora vicina, and Cordylobia
- Oestridae (botflies)
- Sarcophagidae (fleshflies) Sarcophaga barbata are usually found in dead and rotting meat and animal excrement, which are prime environments for them. This is because their larvae are facultative parasites, as they feed on organic tissue and use the hosts' oxygen reserve.

Other families occasionally involved are:

- Anisopodidae
- Piophilidae
- Stratiomyidae
- Syrphidae

==== Specific myiasis ====
Caused by flies that need a host for larval development:

- Dermatobia hominis (human botfly)
- Cordylobia anthropophaga (tumbu fly)
- Cordylobia rodhaini (Lund's fly)
- Oestrus ovis (sheep botfly)
- Hypoderma spp. (cattle botflies or ox warbles)
- Gasterophilus spp. (horse botfly)
- Cochliomyia hominivorax (new world screwworm fly)
- Chrysomya bezziana (old world screwworm fly)
- Auchmeromyia senegalensis (Congo floor maggot)
- Cuterebra spp. (rodent and rabbit botfly)

==== Semispecific myiasis ====
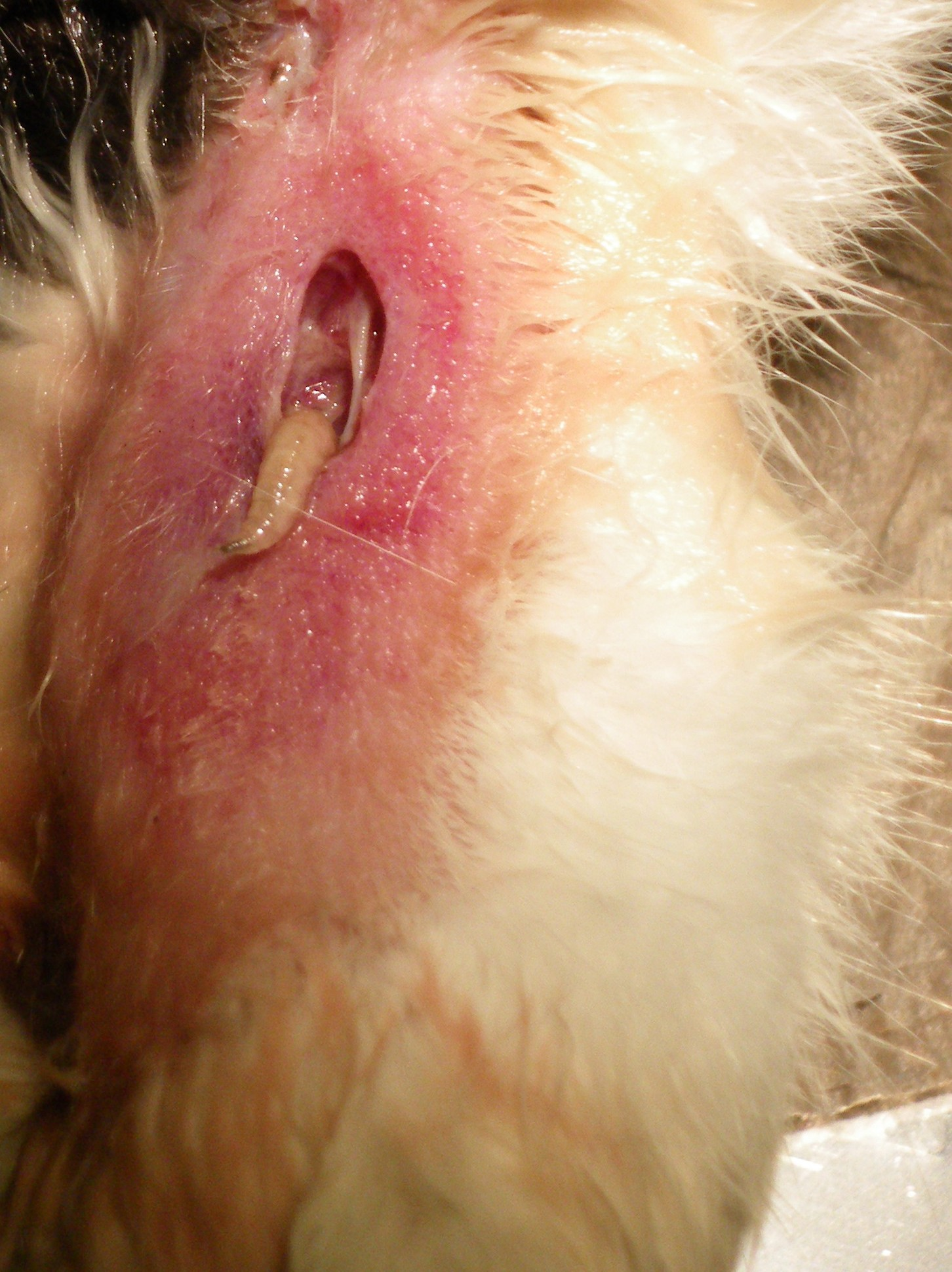
Myiasis in a cat's flesh

Caused by flies that usually lay their eggs in decaying animal or vegetable matter, but that can develop in a host if open wounds or sores are present:

- Lucilia spp. (green-bottle fly)
- Cochliomyia spp. (screw-worm fly)
- Phormia spp. (black-bottle fly)
- Calliphora spp. (blue-bottle fly)
- Sarcophaga spp. (flesh fly or sarcophagids)

Flesh flies, or sarcophagids, members of the family Sarcophagidae, can cause intestinal myiasis in humans if the females deposit larvae on meat or fruit.

==== Accidental myiasis ====
Accidental myiasis, also called pseudomyiasis, occurs when fly larvae are ingested or deposited on the body, leading to an infestation. It is caused by flies that have no preference or need to develop in a host but may do so on rare occasions. Transmission occurs through accidental deposit of eggs on oral or genitourinary openings, or by swallowing eggs or larvae that are on food. Enteric pseudomyiasis can cause nausea, vomiting and gastrointestinal upset.

The cheese fly (Piophila casei) sometimes causes myiasis through intentional consumption of its maggots (which are contained in the traditional Sardinian delicacy casu marzu). Other flies that can accidentally cause myiasis are:

- Musca domestica (housefly)
- Fannia spp. (latrine flies)
- Eristalis tenax (rat-tailed maggots)
- Muscina spp.

The adult flies are not parasitic, but when they lay their eggs in open wounds and these hatch into their larval stage (also known as maggots or grubs), the larvae feed on live or necrotic tissue, causing myiasis to develop. They may also be ingested or enter through other body apertures.

== Diagnosis ==
Myiasis is often misdiagnosed in the United States because it is rare and its symptoms are not specific. Intestinal myiasis and urinary myiasis are especially difficult to diagnose.

Clues that myiasis may be present include recent travel to an endemic area, one or more non-healing lesions on the skin, itchiness, movement under the skin or pain, discharge from a central punctum (tiny hole), or a small, white structure protruding from the lesion. Serologic testing has also been used to diagnose the presence of botfly larvae in human ophthalmomyiasis.

Ultrasound showing maggot infestation

Ultrasound showing maggot infestation

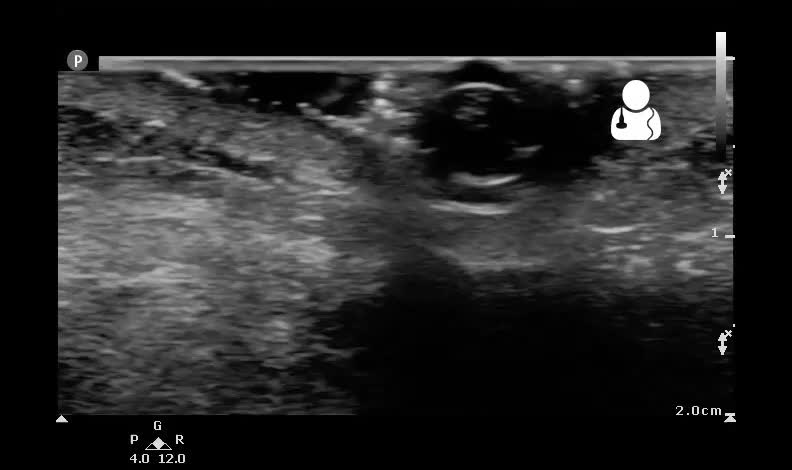
Ultrasound showing maggot infestation

=== Classifications ===
German entomologist Fritz Zumpt describes myiasis as "the infestation of live human and vertebrate animals with dipterous larvae, which at least for a period, feed on the host's dead or living tissue, liquid body substances, or ingested food". For modern purposes, however, this is too vague. For example, feeding on dead or necrotic tissue is not generally a problem except when larvae such as those of flies in the family Piophilidae attack stored food such as cheese or preserved meats; such activity suggests saprophagy rather than parasitism; it even may be medically beneficial in maggot debridement therapy (MDT).

Currently, myiasis commonly is classified according to aspects relevant to the case in question:

- The classical description of myiasis is according to the part of the host that is infected. This is the classification used by ICD-10. For example:
  - dermal
  - sub-dermal
  - cutaneous (B87.0)
    - creeping, where larvae burrow through or under the skin
    - furuncular, where a larva remains in one spot, causing a boil-like lesion
  - nasopharyngeal, in the nose, sinuses or pharynx (B87.3)
  - ophthalmic or ocular, in or about the eye (B87.2)
  - auricular, in or about the ear
  - gastric, rectal, or intestinal/enteric for the appropriate part of the digestive system (B87.8)
  - urogenital (B87.8)
- Another aspect is the relationship between the host and the parasite which provides insight into the biology of the fly species causing the myiasis and its likely effect. Thus the myiasis is described as either:
  - obligatory, where the parasite cannot complete its life cycle without its parasitic phase, which may be specific, semispecific, or opportunistic
  - facultative, incidental, or accidental, where it is not essential to the life cycle of the parasite; perhaps a normally free-living larva accidentally gained entrance to the host

Accidental myiasis commonly is enteric, resulting from swallowing eggs or larvae with one's food. The effect is called pseudomyiasis. One traditional cause of pseudomyiasis was the eating of maggots of cheese flies in cheeses such as Stilton. Depending on the species present in the gut, pseudomyiasis may cause significant medical symptoms, but it is likely that most cases pass unnoticed.

== Prevention ==
The first control method is preventive and aims to eradicate the adult flies before they can cause any damage. The second control method is treatment once the infestation is present, and concerns the infected animals (including humans).

The principal control method of adult populations of myiasis-inducing flies involves insecticide applications in the environment where the target livestock is kept. Organophosphorus or organochlorine compounds may be used, usually in a spraying formulation. One alternative prevention method is the sterile insect technique (SIT) where a significant number of artificially reared sterilized (usually through irradiation) male flies are introduced. The male flies compete with wild breed males for females to copulate and thus cause females to lay batches of unfertilized eggs that cannot develop into the larval stage.

One prevention method involves removing the environment most favourable to the flies, such as by removal of the tail. Another example is the crutching of sheep, which involves the removal of wool from around the tail and between the rear legs, which is a favourable environment for the larvae. Another, more permanent, practice that is used in some countries is mulesing, where the skin is removed from young animals to tighten remaining skin – leaving it less prone to fly attack.

To prevent myiasis in humans, there is a need for general improvement of sanitation, personal hygiene, and extermination of the flies by insecticides. Clothes should be washed thoroughly, preferably in hot water, dried away from flies, and ironed thoroughly. The heat of the iron kills the eggs of myiasis-causing flies.

== Treatment ==
This applies once an infestation is established. In many circles the first response to cutaneous myiasis once the breathing hole has formed is to cover the air hole thickly with petroleum jelly. Lack of oxygen then forces the larva to the surface, where it can more easily be dealt with. In a clinical or veterinary setting there may not be time for such tentative approaches, and the treatment of choice might be more direct, with or without an incision. First, the larva must be eliminated through pressure around the lesion and the use of forceps. Secondly, the wound must be cleaned and disinfected. Further control is necessary to avoid further reinfestation.

Livestock may be treated prophylactically with slow-release boluses containing ivermectin, which can provide long-term protection against the development of the larvae. Sheep also may be dipped, a process that involves drenching the animals in persistent insecticide to poison the larvae before they develop into a problem.

== Epidemiology ==
Myiasis is prevalent in livestock, and especially in domestic sheep. Myiasis in sheep is often caused by blowflies (Lucilia sericata and L. cuprina in particular) and is commonly referred to as blowfly strike. Blowfly strike, and other flystrike, occurs worldwide but is most common in regions where hot and wet conditions are sustained, such as Sub-Saharan Africa, Southeast Asia, Latin America, Australia, and New Zealand. As of 2021, blowfly strike accounts for over A$280 million a year in losses for the Australian sheep industry. As mitigation, Australian sheep farmers may engage in mulesing, a procedure designed to remove strips of wool-producing skin that are the most common targets for flies. Farmers may also dock lambs' tails to reduce the likelihood of infestation. However, both mulesing and tail-docking have received criticism from animal welfare groups, who say the mitigative procedures are excessive and can have other negative effects.

In addition to blowfly strike in sheep, myiasis from screwworm flies (Cochliomyia hominivorax in particular) regularly cause upwards of US$100 million in annual damages to domestic cows and goats. Screwworm-related myiasis is primarily mitigated through the sterile insect technique.

== History ==
Frederick William Hope coined the term myiasis in 1840 to refer to diseases resulting from dipterous larvae as opposed to those caused by other insect larvae (the term for this was scholechiasis). Hope described several cases of myiasis from Jamaica caused by unknown larvae, one of which resulted in death.

Even though the term myiasis was first used in 1840, such conditions have been known since ancient times. Ambroise Paré, the chief surgeon to King Charles IX and King Henry III, observed that maggots often infested open wounds.

== Maggot therapy ==
Maggot debridement therapy (also known as MDT, larval therapy, or simply maggot therapy) is a type of biotherapy involving the introduction of live, disinfected maggots into non-healing skin and soft-tissue wounds of a human or other animal for the purpose of cleaning out the necrotic tissue within a wound (debridement), and disinfection. There is evidence that maggot therapy may help with wound healing.
