= Vulvar myiasis =

Parasitic infection

Myiasis is a parasitic infestation caused by larvae of several fly species. Diagnosis and treatment are generally quite simple. This infestation is, however, rarely seen in the vulvar area. Infestation of vulvar area with larvae and maggots is called vulvar myiasis. Very few cases have been described in literature.
