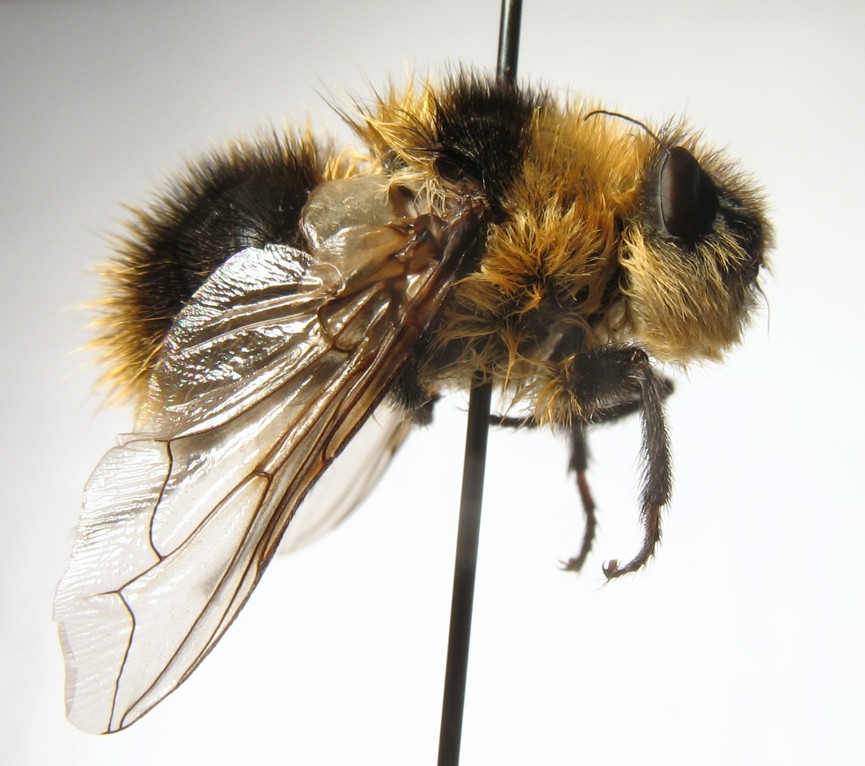

Scientific classification
- Kingdom: Animalia
- Phylum: Arthropoda
- Class: Insecta
- Order: Diptera
- Family: Oestridae
- Genus: Cephenemyia
- Species: C. trompe

Binomial name
- Cephenemyia trompe (Modeer, 1786)

Synonyms
- Oestrus trompe Modeer, 1786

= Cephenemyia trompe =

Reindeer nose botfly

Species of fly

Cephenemyia trompe, also known as the reindeer nose botfly, is a species of botfly first described by Adolph Modéer in 1786. It belongs to the deer botfly genus Cephenemyia. This fly is parasitic on reindeer. It is one of two Cephenemyia species found only in Scandinavia.

The larvae of Cephenemyia trompe infect the nose area of reindeer. The adult is active during the Arctic summer, being able to fly very fast and having developed olfactory abilities to find reindeer from long distances. Its activity, however, is inhibited by strong winds, low temperatures, and rain or snow. This species has a very short pupariation time compared to other reindeer botfly species.

== See also ==
- Botfly
- Hypoderma tarandi, the reindeer warble fly or reindeer botfly, another parasitic reindeer fly
