= Hypodermyasis =

Parasitic infestation

Hypodermyasis is a parasitic infection by the larvae of warble flies, most notably Hypoderma lineatum and Hypoderma bovis. These flies mostly infect cattle in the warmer areas of the Northern Hemisphere. It is a very large issue within the veterinary field throughout the world. There are various other types of parasitic infections dwelling from the Hypoderma genetic family, but the main species that affect cattle and sometimes humans are Hypoderma lineatum and Hypoderma Bovis. Other animals that are sometimes affected are buffalo, sheep, goats, and deer. The hypoderma can be found harming areas of Canada, North Africa, Asia, and Europe. This disease is an economic issue as the human population relies on cattle as a food source, tool for farming, production of manure, and more. However, humans become hosts when they inadvertently swallow the eggs of those flies. Humans are not the intended food source of the flies, but when ingestion of the eggs occurs, the larvae convert to the food source in front of them including human tissue. Since the infestation and increase of this disease has become a global issue, many countries have focused their sights on finding preventative measures for this problem.

== In cattle ==
Since warble flies are an ongoing problem within cattle, they effect the economy as well. The infection starts when the female fly implants her eggs in rows on a hair follicle of the cow. The row of eggs will the hatch and burrow their way into the skin through the hair follicle. They do this by using an enzyme that melts the flesh and their mouths eat away and use the flesh as a food source for an increase in growth. This process damages the tissue of the cow's body. While both types of the fly travel into the flesh, they travel in different ways:

- H. Lineatum travels through the tissue and goes all the way towards the back of the animal.
- H. Bovis travels through the nervous system all the way towards the spinal cord.

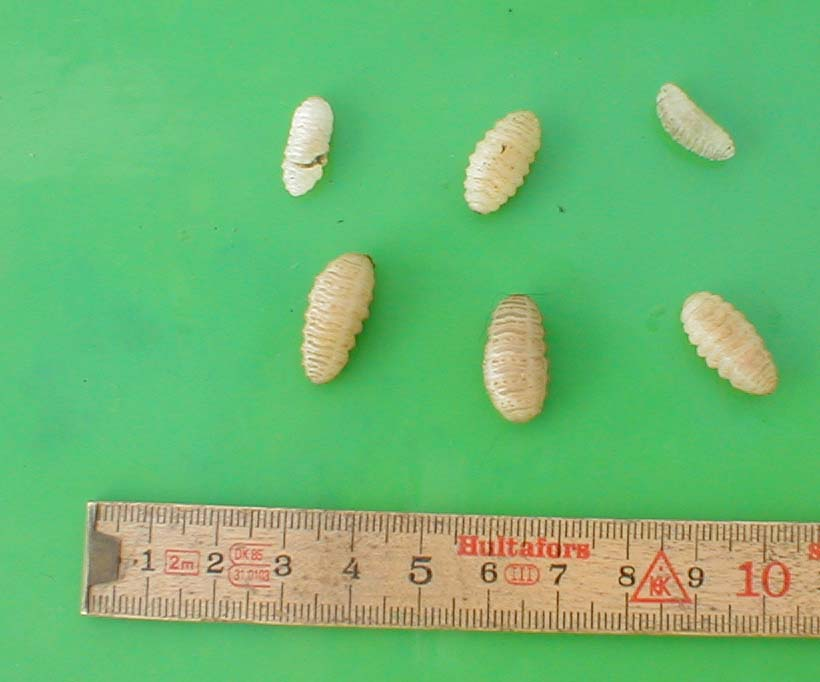
Hypoderma Bovis larvae: demonstrating the size of larvae particularly when they are burrowing through the flesh of the cattle.

After reaching their destination the larvae begin to molt, this process usually takes 30-60 days. As they have now grown exponentially in size they move towards the surface of the skin. This process causes skin lesions and swelling called 'warbles.' The larvae cut out a hole in the most outer layer of skin so that they can breathe and survive. At this point the larvae are very visible from the outside and cause the cattle stress and discomfort. When they finally fully mature in the larvae stage in the cow, they drop out and burrow into the ground to become pupa where they then grow their wings and fully mature bodies finally turning into the flies and the cycle continues from there.

=== Economic effects ===
The lifespan of the larvae is the extremely damaging part of the process and is what causes the cattle extreme stress. Their hides have now become ruined from the burrowing and respiration holes that the larvae have left. As well, as the stress causing a significant decrease in milk production and a decrease in meat quality with high stress levels releasing unwanted hormones into the food. The flies have cost farmers lots of money not just in their production but also in spending money to find prevention for the of the flies. Many attempts have been made at pesticides to prevent the increase in warble flies but there is still some research to be done to have a significant impact on the population of the flies as they still continue to impact the economic industry of cattle farming.

== In people ==
The symptoms of this infection depend on where the larvae migrate into the body when swallowed, however the most common symptoms are:

- Swelling lumps
- Symptoms resembling those of an allergic reaction (Itching and Irritation)
- Skin eruptions that travel along with the parasite in the host
  - Migration causes damage to tissue and irritation
- May cause secondary Infection if an open wound gets infected with bacteria

Hypoderma Parasites in skin: Process of how they initially burrow throw the hair follicle to enter the cattle but then once at maturity create a hole in the skin for respiration.

Most of the time, these infections occur if a person works with cattle in a northern region or lives in a tropical area since human flesh is not the desirable food source for the parasites. There are very few documented cases of humans having a parasitic infection. For example, the first one ever recorded in human history in the North was in July 2014. This case took place in Sardinia Italy, with a farmer who worked with cattle every day. The man went to a skin specialist and reported a swelling an itching sensation within his leg. He had found a pus-filled infection around his collarbone in December of 2014. He popped the raised skin and released a white "worm." As a result the man relieved his symptoms for a short period of time. But after a year he returned again with the same itching and irritation in a different place on his body. Later with testing and analyzation of more "worms" medical professionals soon found that the farmer was suffering from hypodermyasis, the rare parasitic infection.

== Prevention ==
Since the infestation of Hypodermyasis is an ongoing issue not just for cattle and farmers but also economic profit, there have been many efforts for treatment and control of these parasitic flies. Many countries use efficient insecticides which help to control the reproduction of the flies. It is now in the law that some of these pesticides should be used because of how large a problem it can become when the issue is untreated. There are also methods of manual elimination since this has been a constantly irritating ongoing problem for farmers. This worked especially well on islands where infested cattle were immediately taken off the island so it could not spread to any other cattle who might have not been infected yet.

== Treatment ==
If prevention fails and the cattle does become infected there are many vaccines that can completely eradicate the parasite from the cattle's system. Scientists have discovered that cattle can be treated even before infection with the injection or while the infection is occurring. Both of these techniques have an 100% success rate especially when using IVOMEC Gold. This is a very widespread popular treatment used by farmers for its effectiveness that doesn't just get rid of internal parasites such as warble flies but also external parasites such as lice, mites, ticks, and etc..
