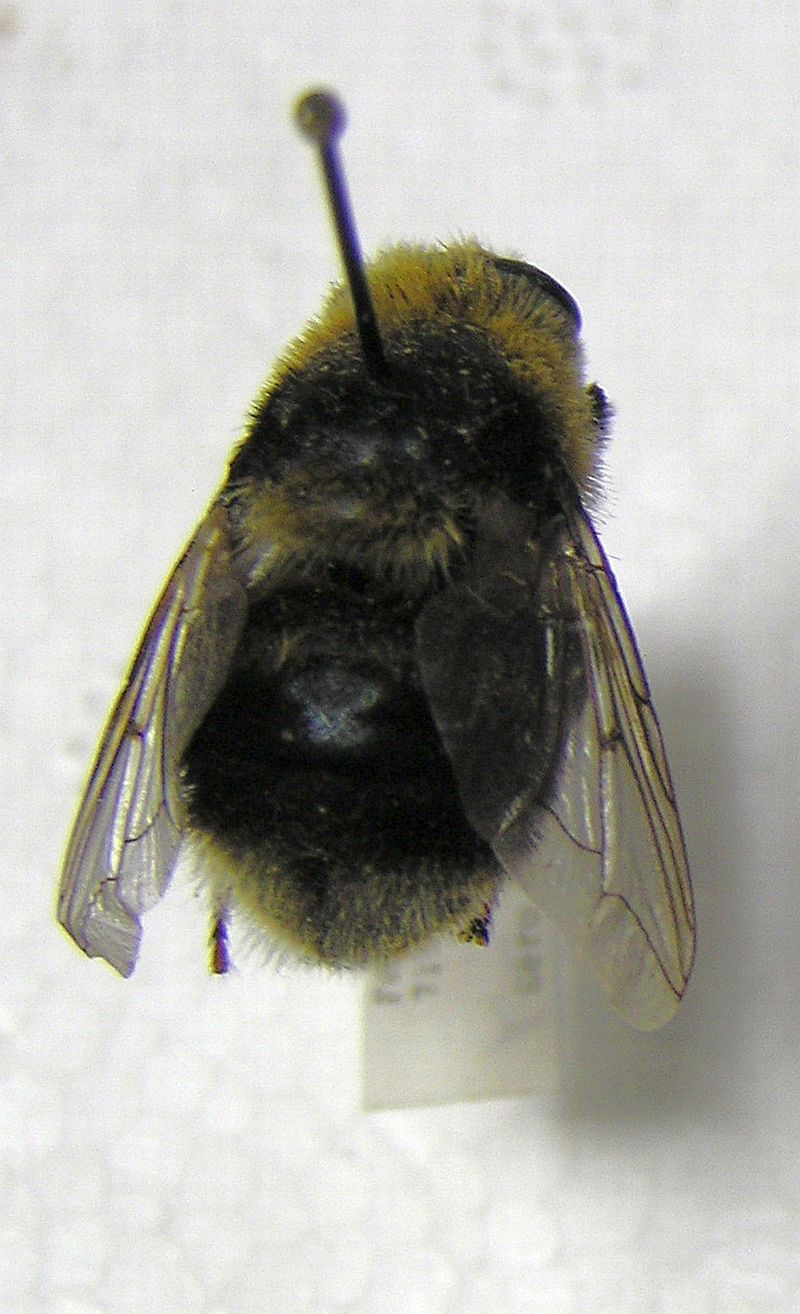

Scientific classification
- Kingdom: Animalia
- Phylum: Arthropoda
- Class: Insecta
- Order: Diptera
- Family: Oestridae
- Genus: Cephenemyia
- Species: C. ulrichii

Binomial name
- Cephenemyia ulrichii Brauer, 1863

= Cephenemyia ulrichii =

Species of fly

Cephenemyia ulrichii, the moose botfly, elk botfly, moose nose botfly or moose throat botfly, is a large botfly that resembles a bumblebee. In the wild, they attack chiefly the nostrils and pharyngeal cavity of moose (also known as elk in Europe), but have been found in other deer species. There have also been several cases of C. ulrichii squirting their larvae into the eyes of human beings, a somewhat painful event that requires medical attention to forestall any possibility of serious damage.

== Description ==
The adult C. ulrichii botfly is 16–18 mm long, its body covered with fluffy hairs of yellow, black and white, making it look like a bumblebee. Mouth parts are reduced and, like other adult Cephenemyia, they cannot feed.

Eggs hatch inside the female into first instar larvae, which are minute, white with black heads and barbed. In sunny weather, from July to September, females seek out an appropriate host site, typically the nostrils of a moose, and forcefully eject larvae onto its surface. Larvae enter their second instar in the moose's nostrils, then travel to its throat for the third instar. Third instar larvae have rows of spines on both ventral and dorsal surfaces and may be up to 4 cm long.

When fully formed, the larva is ejected by the moose, mixed with blood and mucus. It pupates in the soil.

== Habitat ==
C. ulrichii are common parasites of moose in northeastern parts of Scandinavia, but have recently expanded their range into southern Sweden. They have also been reported in Denmark, northeast Norway and the Baltic states.

Although once thought to be a species specific to Alces alces, they have recently been found in western roe deer (Capreolus capreolus) near Helsinki.

== Economic and medical impact ==
Several cases of human ophthalmomyiasis due to C. ulrichii have been reported in Sweden and Finland. In one case in 2010, a woman was walking in the woods near Falun in Dalarna, Sweden, when a moose botfly squirted more than 30 larvae into her eye. The larvae were removed by a doctor before they attached to the cornea, which can cause serious damage. Due to their barbs, it is difficult to wash the larvae out of the eye. One physician has suggested that C. ulrichii mistakes a human eye for the nostril of a moose because human eyes face forward, as do moose nostrils.

Botfly larvae of other kinds have also been known to cause eye problems for human beings.
