= Verticia =

Scientific classification
- Kingdom: Animalia
- Phylum: Arthropoda
- Class: Insecta
- Order: Diptera
- Family: Calliphoridae
- Subfamily: Bengaliinae
- Genus: Verticia; Malloch, 1927

Species
- see text

Genus of flies

Verticia is a genus of flies (Diptera) in the family Calliphoridae. The genus was first described by John Russell Malloch in 1927.

== Species ==
- Verticia chani Kurahashi, Benjaphong & Omar, 1997
- Verticia fasciventris Malloch, 1927
- Verticia indochinica Kurahashi & Chowanadisai, 2001
- Verticia nigra Malloch, 1927
- Verticia orientalis Malloch, 1927
- Verticia quatei Kurahashi & Chowanadisai, 2001

== Biology ==
The larva of the species Verticia fasciventris are parasites and develop in the heads of termites.

The genus name was also used for Bacteria (the species Verticia sediminum) in 2015. A renaming to Verticiella was proposed in 2016 when the name was discovered to be a later homonym.
