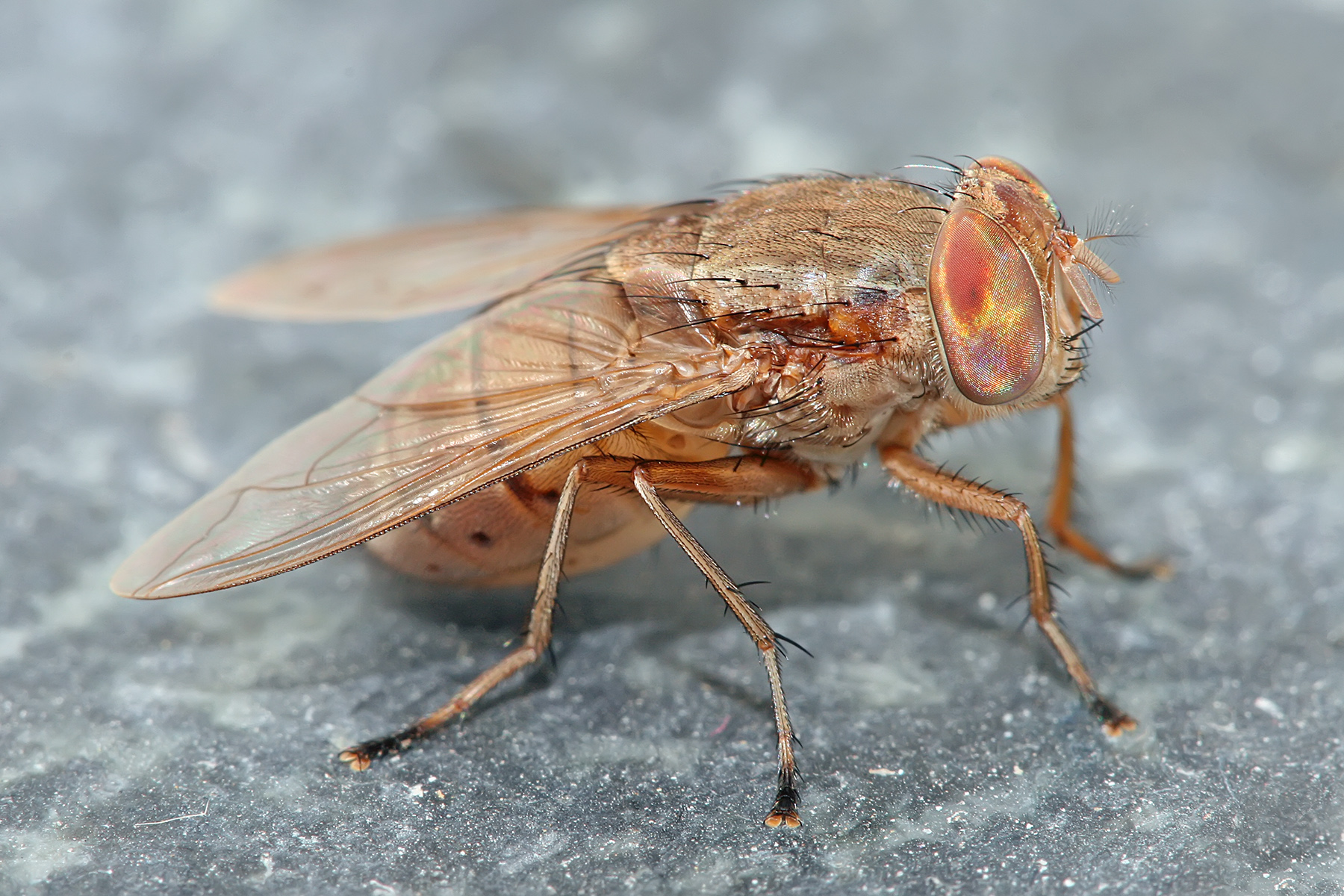

Scientific classification
- Kingdom: Animalia
- Phylum: Arthropoda
- Class: Insecta
- Order: Diptera
- Family: Calliphoridae
- Subfamily: Bengaliinae; Brauer & Bergenstamm, 1889

Genera
- see text

Synonyms
- Eucalliphorinae Villeneuve, 1920 (Unav.); Xantochocalliphorinae Villeneuve, 1920 (Unav.); Auchmeromyiinae Patton, 1935; Cordylobiini Lehrer, 1970 (Unav.); Pachychoeromyiini Lehrer, 1970 (Unav.); Tricycleinae Lehrer, 1970; Booponini Fan, 1992; Coganomyinae Peris & González-Mora, 2004; Afridigaliinae Lehrer, 2005; Gangelomyinae Lehrer, 2005; Gangelomyiinae Lehrer, 2005; Maraviolinae Lehrer, 2005

= Bengaliinae =

Subfamily of flies

The Bengaliinae are a subfamily of Calliphoridae, or blow flies.

== Genera ==
- Auchmeromyia Brauer & Bergenstamm, 1891
- Bengalia Robineau-Desvoidy, 1830
- Booponus Aldrich, 1923
- Coganomyia Dear, 1977
- Cordylobia Grünberg, 1903
- Hemigymnochaeta Corti, 1895
- Mafikengia Rognes, 2011
- Pachychoeromyia Villeneuve, 1920
- Termitocalliphora Bauristhene in Pont, 1980
- Termitoloemus Baranov, 1936
- Tricyclea Wulp, 1885
- Tricycleala Villeneuve, 1937
- Verticia Malloch, 1927
