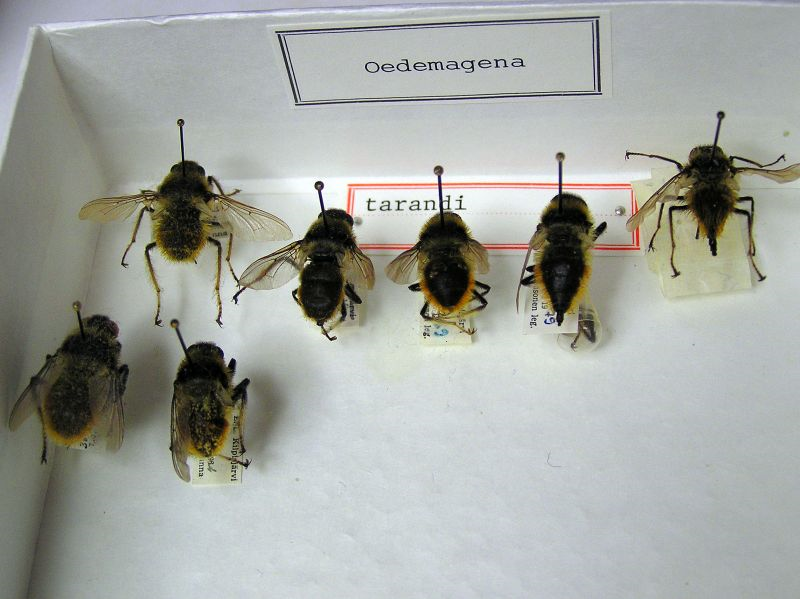

Scientific classification
- Kingdom: Animalia
- Phylum: Arthropoda
- Clade: Pancrustacea
- Class: Insecta
- Order: Diptera
- Family: Oestridae
- Genus: Hypoderma
- Species: H. tarandi

Binomial name
- Hypoderma tarandi Linné, 1758

Synonyms
- Oedemagena tarandi Oestrus tarandi

= Hypoderma tarandi =

Reindeer warble fly

Species of fly

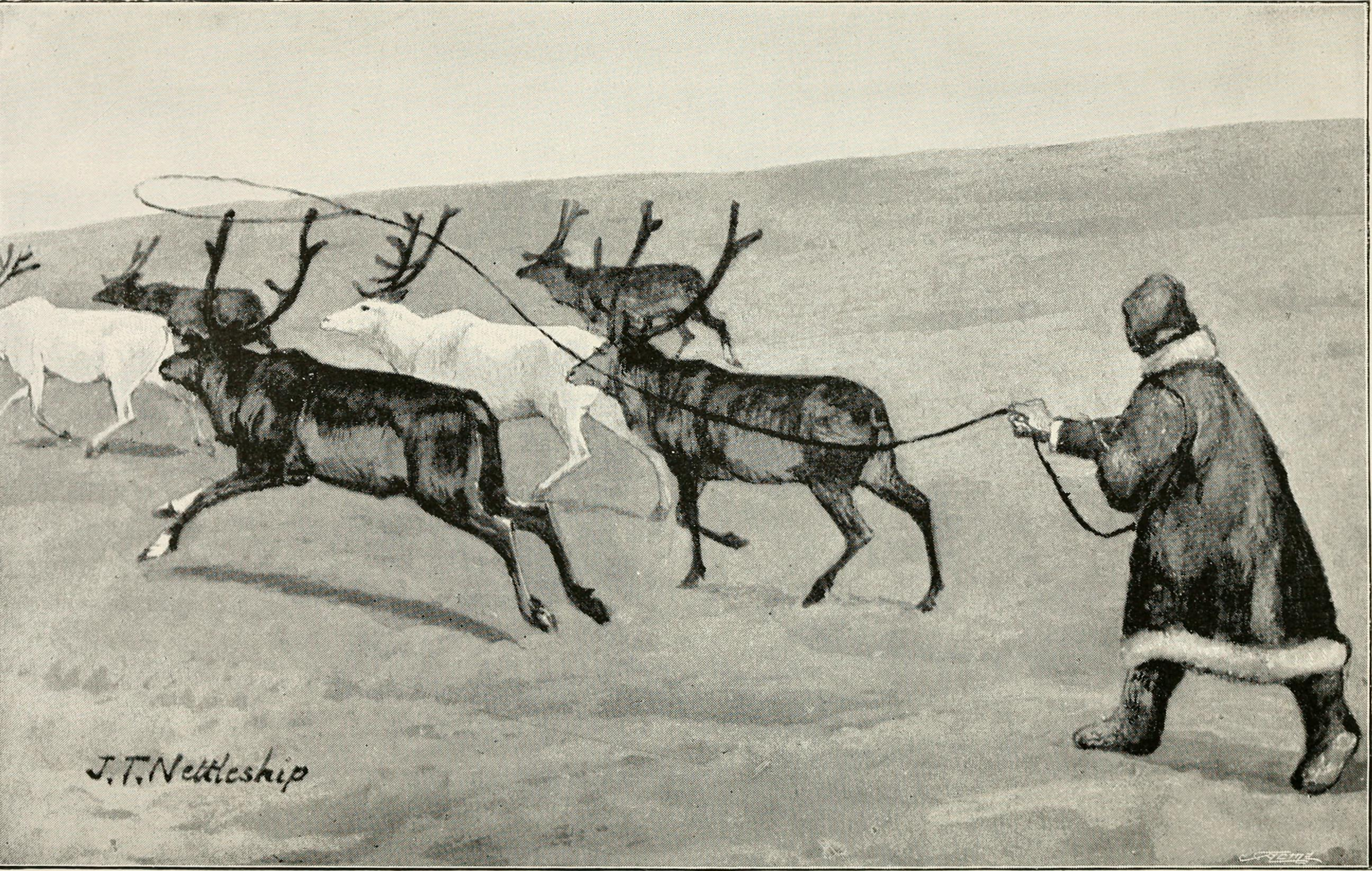
A reindeer herd in Kolguyev Island in 1895. The caption reads: "We entered today on a new phase of reindeer life. For the first time the fly appeared (Hypoderma tarandi), known to the Samoyeds as Pi-liur, and to the Russians as Orwot.

Hypoderma tarandi, also known as the reindeer warble fly and reindeer botfly, is a species of warble fly that is parasitic on reindeer.

The larvae of this fly are a skin-penetrating ectoparasite that usually infest populations of reindeer and caribou in Arctic areas, causing harm to the hides, meat and milk in domesticated herds. They also may cause ophthalmomyiasis in humans, leading to uveitis, glaucoma and retinal detachment. H. lineatum and H. sinense may also infest humans.

== As food ==
In cold climates supporting reindeer- or caribou-reliant populations, large quantities of Hypoderma tarandi maggots are available to human populations during the butchery of animals.

Hypoderma tarandi larvae were part of the traditional diet of the Nunamiut people. Copious art dating back to the Pleistocene in Europe confirms their consumption in premodern times, as well.

The sixth episode of season one of the television series Beyond Survival entitled "The Inuit - Survivors of the Future" features survival expert Les Stroud and two Inuit guides hunting caribou on the northern coast of Baffin Island near Pond Inlet, Nunavut, Canada. Upon skinning and butchering of one of the animals, numerous larvae (presumably Hypoderma tarandi, although not explicitly stated) are apparent on the inside of the caribou pelt. Stroud and his two Inuit guides eat (albeit somewhat reluctantly) one larva each, with Stroud commenting that the larva "tastes like milk" and was historically commonly consumed by the Inuit.

== See also ==
- Botfly
- Cephenemyia trompe, the reindeer nose botfly, another parasitic reindeer fly
