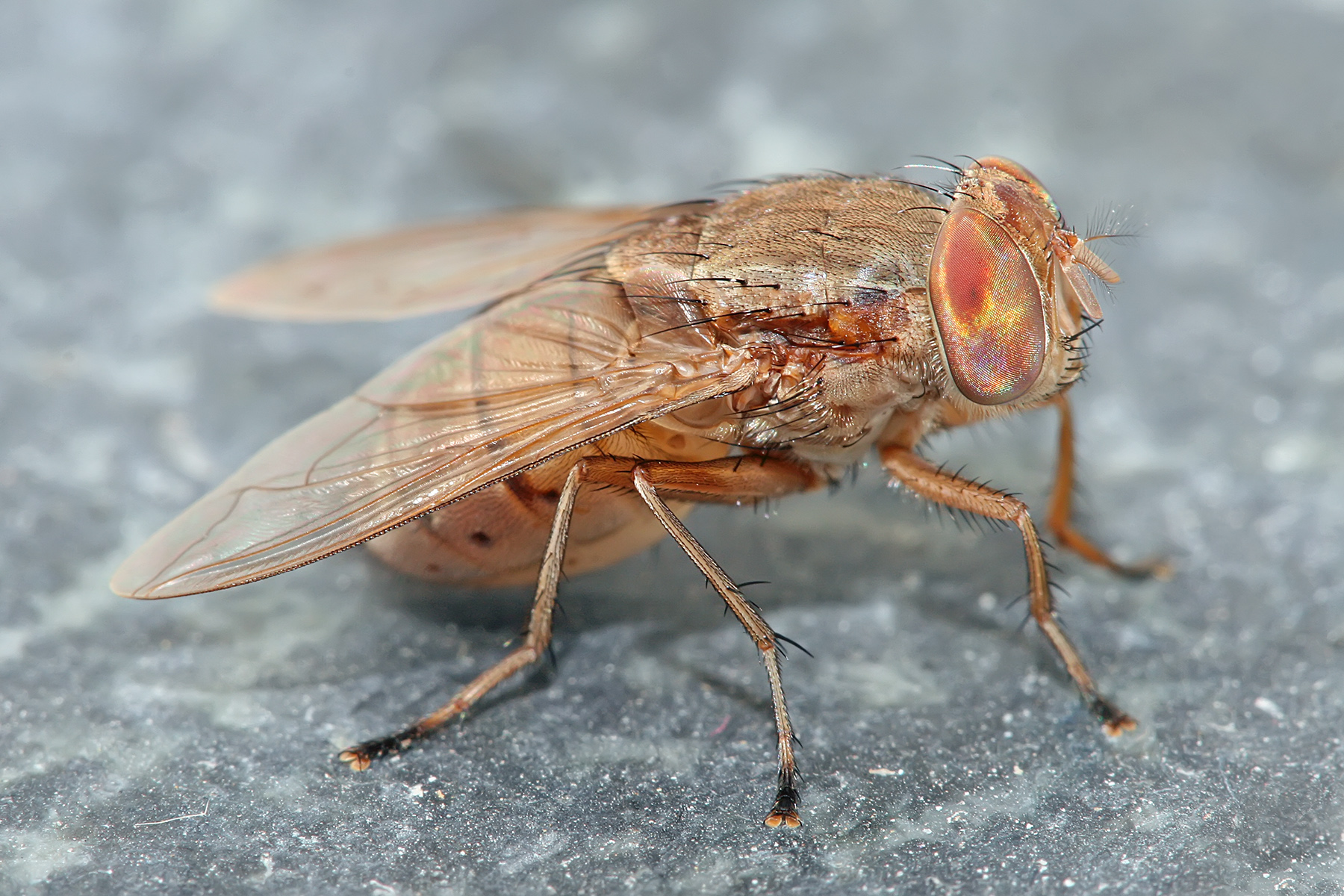

Scientific classification
- Kingdom: Animalia
- Phylum: Arthropoda
- Clade: Pancrustacea
- Class: Insecta
- Order: Diptera
- Family: Calliphoridae
- Subfamily: Bengaliinae
- Genus: Bengalia; Robineau-Desvoidy, 1830

Type species
- Bengalia testacea Robineau-Desvoidy, 1830

Species
- >65 species, see text

Synonyms
- Ochromyia Macquart, 1835; Anisomyia Walker, 1859; Homodexia Bigot, 1885; Parabengalia Roubaud, 1913; Pollenoides Matsumura, 1916; Eubengalia Townsend, 1926; Afridigalia Lehrer, 2005; Ashokiana Lehrer, 2005; Bezzigalia Lehrer, 2005; Gangelomyia Lehrer, 2005; Kenypyga Lehrer, 2005; Laoziana Lehrer, 2005; Maraviola Lehrer, 2005; Ochromyia Lehrer, 2005 (Homo.); Shakaniella Lehrer, 2005; Temaseka Lehrer, 2005; Tsunamia Lehrer, 2005; Sindhigalia Lehrer, 2006; Anshuniana Lehrer, 2010 (Nom. Nud.); Anshuniana Lehrer & Wei, 2010

= Bengalia =

Genus of flies

Bengalia is a genus of blow flies in the family Calliphoridae with one authority considering the genus to belong to a separate family Bengaliidae. These bristly and, unlike the greens and blues of most calliphorids, dull coloured flies, are especially noted for their relationship to ants. Little is known of their biology and life-cycle, although adults of many species are kleptoparasitic on ants and will snatch food and pupae being carried by ants or feed on winged termites. The apt name “Highwayman Fly” was given by an early observer of their way of robbing ants. Very little is known about their breeding habits. The genus is found in the Afrotropical and oriental region with one species from Australia possibly a recent introduction.

== Description ==
Most of the species have a yellow or brown ground-colour, an antero-posteriorly compressed head, stout mouthparts, a projecting clypeus below the lower facial margin, and have a silent flight.

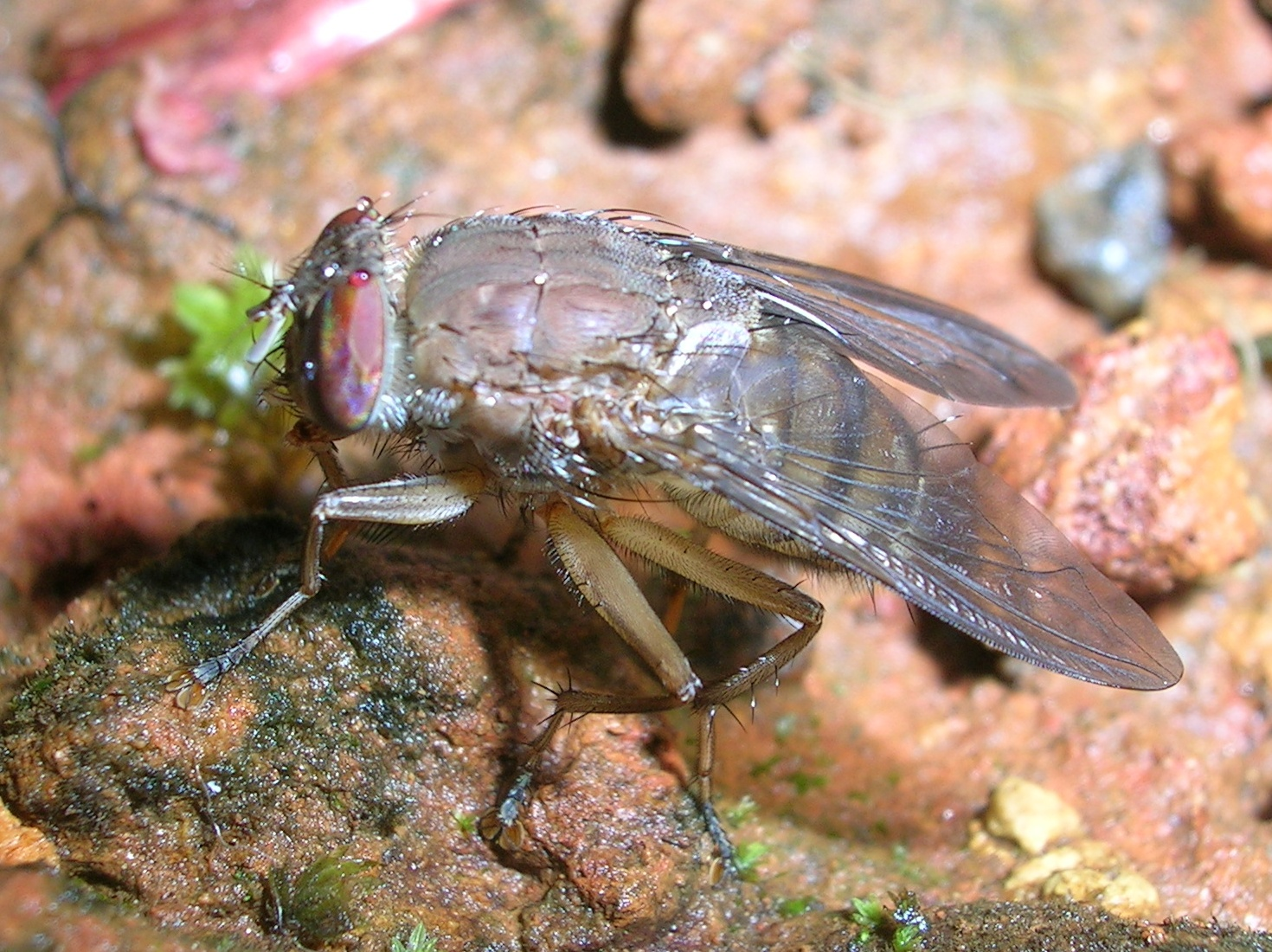

== Behaviour ==
Bengalia flies are best known for their remarkable highwayman-like habit of robbing ant pupae from ants moving on ant roads. With respect to Bengalia depressa this habit is described as follows: “[The flies were] settling on blades of grass, stones, and other raised objects near the ant column. ... When any ant made a little circuit away from the main body, a fly would generally pursue it at a distance of about half an inch, but back away as soon as the ant turned towards it. ... Eventually Lamborn saw a fly stalk a minor ant carrying a pupa in its jaws. Suddenly the fly rushed forward and apparently pierced the pupa bringing the ant up with a sharp jerk. The two insects then had a tug of war with very little advantage to either side, until the ant apparently became annoyed and letting go of the pupa rushed at the fly, which escaped with the booty which it proceeded to suck. Then he saw a fly swoop down on the ant column and rise at once with a pupa and attendant ant, both of which it dropped after carrying them for about a foot. The ant, however, still held on and started to run off with its charge. The fly caught it again and this time rose three feet in the air and then dropped ant and pupa again. This time the ant left the pupa which the fly immediately seized and proceeded to suck.”

== Species ==
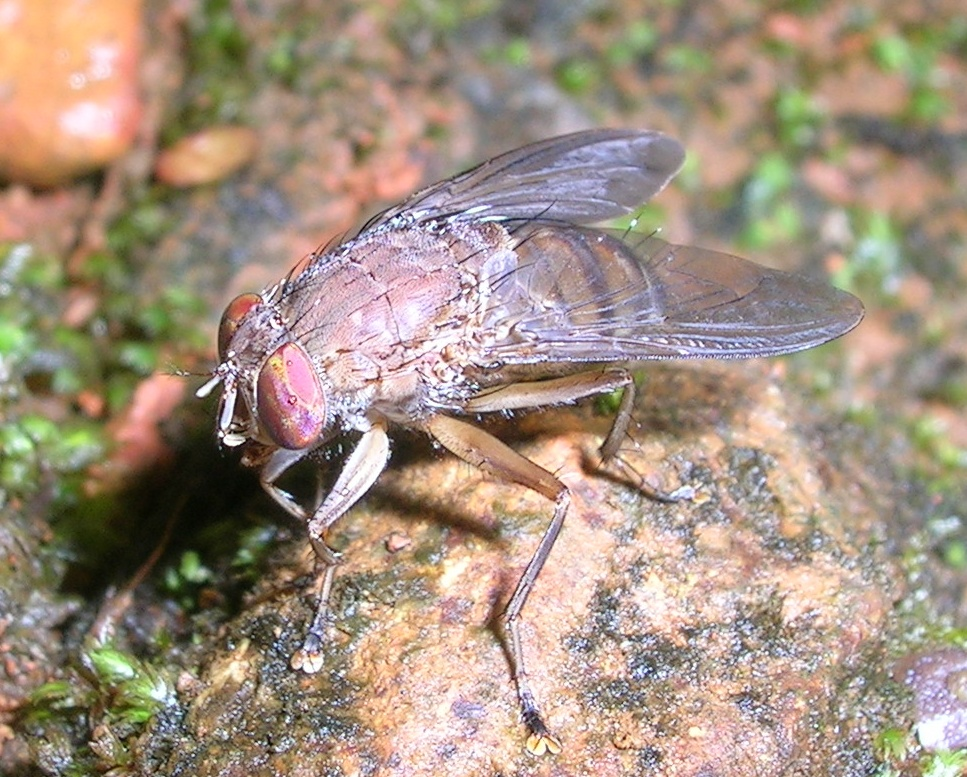

- Bengalia africana Malloch, 1927
- Bengalia africanoides Rognes
- Bengalia akamanga (Lehrer)
- Bengalia aliena Malloch, 1927
- Bengalia asymmetria Kurahashi & Tumrasvin, 1979
- Bengalia bantuphalla (Lehrer)
- Bengalia bezzii Senior-White, 1923
- Bengalia calilungae Rueda, 1985
- Bengalia chekiangensis Fan
- Bengalia chiangmaiensis Kurahashi & Tumrasvin, 1979
- Bengalia chromatella Séguy, 1946
- Bengalia concava Malloch, 1927
- Bengalia cuthbertsoni Zumpt, 1956
- Bengalia depressa Walker, 1858
- Bengalia emarginata Malloch
- Bengalia emarginatoides Rognes
- Bengalia emdeniella (Lehrer)
- Bengalia escheri Bezzi, 1913
- Bengalia fani Feng & Wei
- Bengalia favillacea (Walker)
- Bengalia fernandiella Lehrer
- Bengalia floccosa Wulp
- Bengalia fuscipennis Bezzi, 1913
- Bengalia gaillardi Sourcouf & Guyon, 1912 - Synonyms:B. spurca Brauer & Bergenstamm, 1891, B. spurca Villeneuve, 1914
- Bengalia gigas Macquart
- Bengalia hastativentris Senior-White, 1923
- Bengalia hobbyi Senior-White, 1940
- Bengalia inermis Malloch, 1927
- Bengalia jejuna Fabricius
- Bengalia kanoi Kurahashi & Magpayo, 2000
- Bengalia kuyanianus Matsumura
- Bengalia labiata Robineau-Desvoidy, 1830
- Bengalia lampunia Lehrer
- Bengalia lateralis Macquart
- Bengalia latro Meijere
- Bengalia lyneborgi James, 1966
- Bengalia martinleakei Senior-White, 1930
- Bengalia minor Malloch, 1927
- Bengalia nirvanella Lehrer
- Bengalia pallidicoxa Senior-White, 1946
- Bengalia peuhi Villeneuve, 1914
- Bengalia pseudovaricolor Kurahashi & Tumrasvin, 1979
- Bengalia pygomalaya Lehrer
- Bengalia racovitzai (Lehrer)
- Bengalia recurva Malloch, 1927
- Bengalia robertsi Kurahashi, 1987
- Bengalia roubaudi Rickenbach, Hamon & Mochet, 1960
- Bengalia semerunia Lehrer
- Bengalia seniorwhitei (Lehrer)
- Bengalia siamensis Senior-White, 1924
- Bengalia smarti (Lehrer)
- Bengalia spinifemorata Villeneuve, 1913
- Bengalia subnitida James, 1964
- Bengalia surcoufi Senior-White, 1923
- Bengalia taiwanensis Fan, 1965
- Bengalia taksina (Lehrer)
- Bengalia tibiaria Villeneuve, 1926
- Bengalia torosa Wiedemann
- Bengalia unicolor Senior-White, 1946
- Bengalia varicolor Fabricius, 1805
- Bengalia wangariae (Lehrer)
- Bengalia weii Rognes
- Bengalia wyatti (Lehrer)
- Bengalia xanthopyga Senior-White, 1924
- Bengalia zhangi (Lehrer & Wei)

== Taxonomic dispute ==
The genus was reclassified into 11 new genera in 4 subfamilies by Andy Lehrer in 2005, within a newly designated family, Bengaliidae. The family designation was disputed by Rognes (2006) who noted that it was equivalent to the already established tribe Bengaliini (now the subfamily Bengaliinae), and that treating it as a family would render the Calliphoridae paraphyletic. Further, Rognes considered all the new genera created as junior synonyms of Bengalia. Lehrer's work proposed adding 49 species to the already described 41 species and 18 of these new species were treated as invalid by Rognes. At present, major sources of Dipteran taxonomy do not recognize Lehrer's 10 new genera as valid, nor the 18 new species treated as invalid by Rognes (e.g.). Additional names (of these and related flies) published by Lehrer have since been synonymized, with 120 new synonymies established in a single review in 2020.

This dispute reflects that at present, there is no consensus as to the best way to subdivide the Calliphoridae, which many authorities acknowledge is not a natural group (in this case, polyphyletic); the BioSystematic Database of World Diptera, for example, states "The Calliphoridae are marked as a polyphyletic group of convenience as at the present we are unwilling to reduce the Oestridae to a subordinated group within a monophyletic Calliphoridae nor to elevate a number of other groups (Polleniidae, Helicoboscidae, and Bengaliidae) so as to properly delimit both Calliphoridae and Oestridae." Similarly, the dispute at the generic level is that some of Lehrer's genera are paraphyletic, and, additionally, that they are based largely or exclusively upon features of the male genitalia, and it is therefore impossible to identify most female specimens to subfamily, let alone genus (the rejection of Lehrer's subdivisions therefore being both taxonomic and a matter of practicality). The dispute at the species level centers on the fact that Lehrer did not include or examine 24 of the 41 known species in his revision, so of the 31 species he validly described that were not immediately synonymized, many could still potentially be synonyms of these 24 excluded species.
