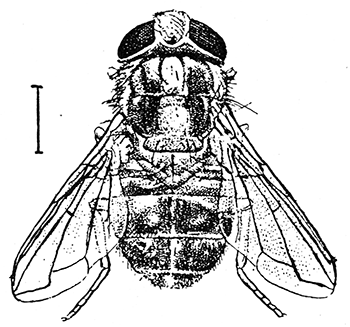
- Drawing of adult Cordylobia anthropophaga

Scientific classification
- Kingdom: Animalia
- Phylum: Arthropoda
- Clade: Pancrustacea
- Class: Insecta
- Order: Diptera
- Family: Calliphoridae
- Subfamily: Bengaliinae
- Genus: Cordylobia; Grünberg, 1903

Type species
- Ochromyia anthropophaga Blanchard, 1872

Synonyms
- Stasisia Surcouf, 1914; Neocordylobia Villeneuve, 1929

= Cordylobia =

Genus of flies

Cordylobia is a genus of flies from the family Calliphoridae. The larvae of Cordylobia are parasitic on mammals, especially rodents. Two species, C. anthropophaga (the tumbu fly) and C. rodhaini (Lund's fly), also are known as parasites of humans. The adult flies feed on rotting fruits, vegetables, and animal faeces, and are most abundant in the wet season. Like many tropical insects, they are most active in the morning and evening. Cordylobia species are largely confined to Africa, though they have been recorded elsewhere when transported by human travellers.

== Species ==
The genus consists of four species:

- Cordylobia anthropophaga (Blanchard, 1872) - tumbu fly
- Cordylobia rodhaini Gedoelst, 1910 (=ebadiana) - Lund's fly
- Cordylobia roubaudi Villeneuve, 1929
- Cordylobia ruandae Fain, 1953
- Pachychoeromyia praegrandis Austen, 1910 was originally described as belonging to Cordylobia, but is now placed in the monotypic genus Pachychoeromyia Villeneuve, 1920.
