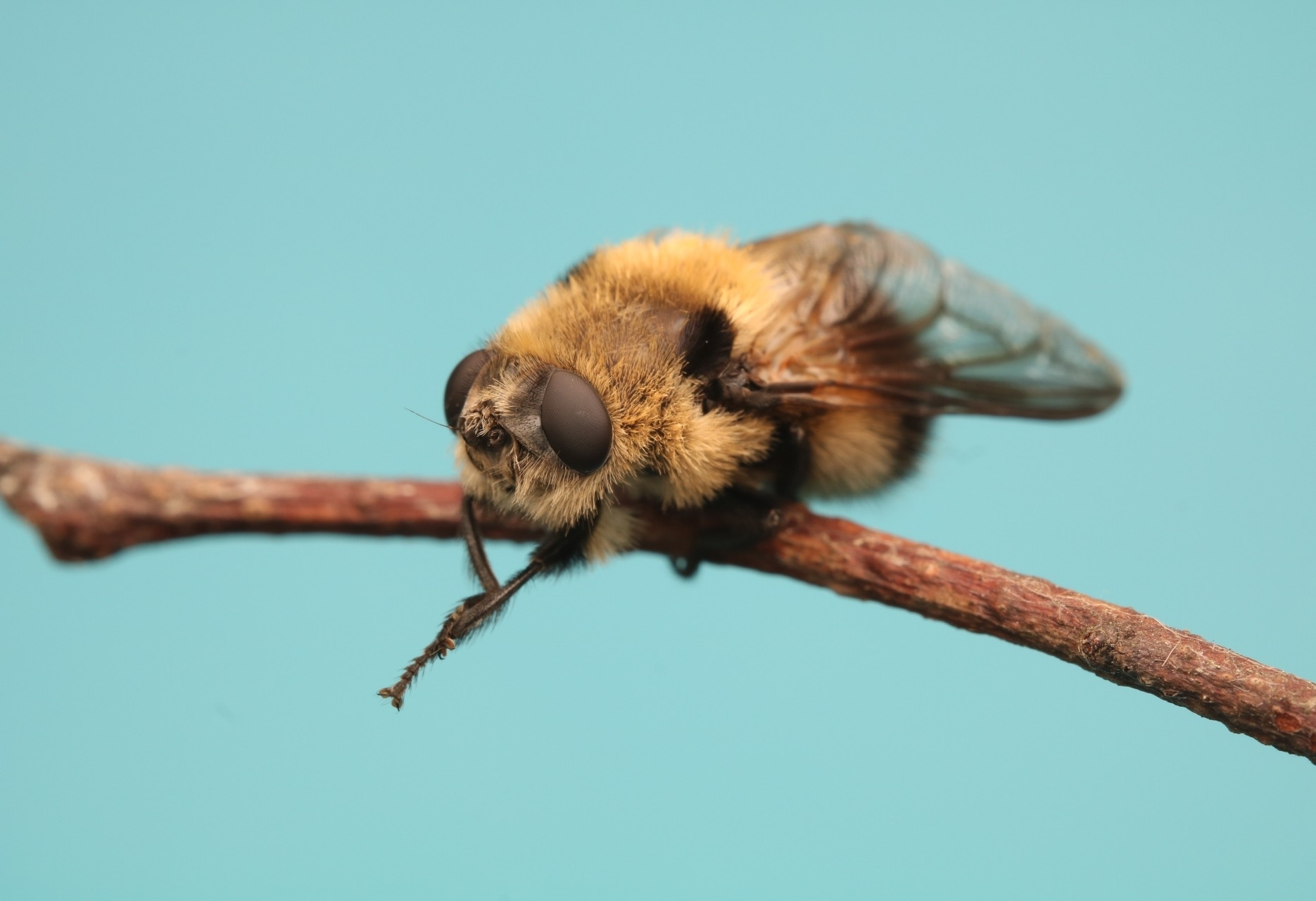
- Image of Cephenemyia phobifer

Scientific classification
- Kingdom: Animalia
- Phylum: Arthropoda
- Class: Insecta
- Order: Diptera
- Family: Oestridae
- Genus: Cephenemyia
- Species: C. phobifer

Binomial name
- Cephenemyia phobifer (Clark, 1815)

Synonyms
- Cephenemyia abdominalis Aldrich, 1915; Oestrus phobifer Clark, 1815

= Cephenemyia phobifer =

Species of fly

Cephenemyia phobifer is a species of nose bot fly in the family Oestridae.
