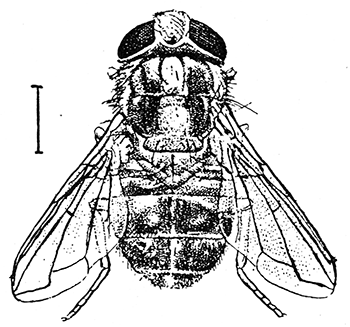
- Adult
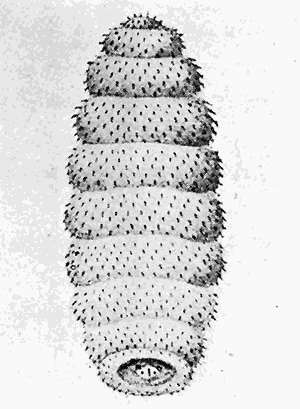
- Larva

Scientific classification
- Kingdom: Animalia
- Phylum: Arthropoda
- Clade: Pancrustacea
- Class: Insecta
- Order: Diptera
- Family: Calliphoridae
- Genus: Cordylobia
- Species: C. anthropophaga

Binomial name
- Cordylobia anthropophaga (Blanchard & Bérenger-Féraud, 1872)

Synonyms
- Ochromyia anthropophaga Blanchard & Bérenger-Féraud, 1872; Cordylobia gruenbergi Dönitz, 1906; Cordylobia murium Döntitz, 1906; Cordylobia sarcophaga Scheben, 1910; Oestrus livingstonii Cobbold, 1879

= Cordylobia anthropophaga =

Species of fly

Cordylobia anthropophaga, the mango fly, tumbu fly, tumba fly, putzi fly, or skin maggot fly, is a species of blow-fly common in East and Central Africa and Southern Africa. It is a parasite of large mammals (including humans) during its larval stage. C. anthropophaga is found in the tropics of Africa and is a common cause of myiasis in humans in the region.

Its specific epithet anthropophaga derives from the Greek word anthropophagos, "human eater".

The mode of infection by the Cayor Worm. Doctors Rodhain and Bequaert conclude, from their observations in the Congo Free State, that Cordylobia anthropophaga lays its eggs on the ground. The larvae, known generally as Cayor Worms, crawl over the soil until they come in contact with a mammal, penetrate the skin and lie in the subcutaneous tissue, causing the formation of tumors. On reaching full growth, the larvae leave the host, fall to the ground, bury themselves and then pupate. This fly is said to be the most common cause of human or animal myiasis in tropical Africa, from Senegal to Natal. In the region of Lower Katanga where these investigations were made, dogs appeared to be the principal hosts, although Cordylobia larvae were found also in guinea-pigs, a monkey, and two humans. The larvae are always localized on those parts of the hosts which come in immediate contact with the soil."

— Ann. Soc. Entom. de Belgique, Iv, pp. 192–197, 1911) summary translation in Entomological News. 1911 Vol. xxii:467.

== History of discovery ==
The larvae of the tumbu fly, Cordylobia anthropophaga, were first described in Senegal in 1862, and Émile Blanchard first described the adult and gave it its name in 1872. In 1903, Grünberg placed the tumbu fly in a new genus, Cordylobia.

== Life cycle ==
Female tumbu flies deposit around 300 eggs in sandy soil, often contaminated with feces. The hatched larvae can remain viable in the soil for 9–15 days, when they need to find a host to continue developing. If a larva finds a host, it penetrates the skin and takes 8–12 days developing through three larval stages before it reaches the prepupal stage. It then leaves the host, drops to the ground, buries itself, and pupates. It then becomes an adult fly able to reproduce and begin the cycle all over again.

== Clinical presentation in humans ==
Successful penetrations in humans results in furuncular (boil-like) myiasis, typically on the backs of arms or about the waist, lower back, or buttocks.

C. anthropophaga rarely causes severe problems, and mainly causes cutaneous myiasis. Geary et al. describe the presentation of cutaneous myiasis caused by the tumbu fly: "At the site of penetration, a red papule forms and gradually enlarges. At first the host may experience only intermittent, slight itching, but pain develops and increases in frequency and intensity as the lesions develop into a furuncle. The furuncle's aperture opens, permitting fluids containing blood and waste products of the maggot to drain."

== Transmission ==
Female tumbu flies lay their eggs in soil contaminated with feces or urine or on damp clothing or bed linens. Damp clothing hanging to dry makes for a perfect spot. The larvae hatch in 2–3 days and attach to unbroken skin and penetrate the skin, producing swelling and infection. If the larvae hatch in soil, any disturbance of the soil causes them to wriggle to the surface to penetrate the skin of the host.

== Reservoir and vector ==
A natural reservoir is defined as an organism that can harbor a pathogen indefinitely with no ill effects. Although C. anthropophaga larvae can cause ill effects for animal hosts, relative to myiasis in humans, animal hosts are reservoirs.

Many animals are hosts of C. anthropophaga. The dog is the most common domestic host and several species of wild rats are the preferred field hosts. Domestic fowl are dead-end hosts; the larvae cannot develop when they enter the tissue of a fowl.

Humans are, in fact, accidental hosts; tumbu fly larvae do not usually infect humans.

A vector is an organism that carries the parasites (the larvae) from one host to another. The tumbu fly itself is the vector in a loose sense, because the female deposits the eggs in soil or on damp cloth, where the larvae can hatch and attach to human or animal skin.

== Diagnostics ==
Cutaneous myiasis caused by the tumbu fly should be suspected when a patient who has just spent time in sub-Saharan Africa presents with ulcers or boil-like sores. Definitive diagnosis is only possible when the larvae are found. They should be removed and allowed to develop into adult flies for identification and examination purposes.

== Treatment ==
When C. anthropophaga causes cutaneous myiasis, the larvae more often than not can be removed without any incision. Covering the punctum (the breathing hole) with petroleum jelly or similar substances cuts off the air supply and forces the maggot to the surface, where it is easy to capture with forceps. If this does not work, local anesthetic can be administered and an incision made to widen the punctum and remove the maggot. Another treatment discussed in the March 2014 Journal of the American Medical Association is to inject a combination of anaesthetic and epinephrine into the insect's chamber. Less drastically, because larvae of C. anthropophaga have smaller hooked bristles on the cuticle than those of Dermatobia hominis, it often is practical just to push on each side of the hole to squeeze the maggot out, especially after first enlarging the punctum. It is important not to burst the larva to prevent the risk of granulomatous or serious inflammatory reaction.

Patients should be monitored for additional and subsequent lesions, as development does not occur in unison and some larvae may take longer to reach the prepupal stage. Antiseptics or antibiotics may be useful to prevent bacterial infection after removal of the larvae, but in practice are not often necessary; the secretions of the larva tend to discourage bacterial growth. As a rule, the wound may be expected to heal readily.

== Epidemiology ==
The tumbu fly is endemic to the tropical regions of Africa, south of the Sahara. Myiasis caused by C. anthropophaga is the most common cause of myiasis in Africa, but can be seen worldwide because of air travel, as human movements carry infestation outside endemic areas.

== Public health and prevention strategies ==
The fly commonly infects humans by laying its eggs on wet clothes, left out to dry. The eggs hatch in one to three days and the larvae (which can survive without a host for up to 15 days) then burrow into the skin when the clothes are worn. A prevention method is to iron all clothes, including underwear, which kills the eggs/larvae.
