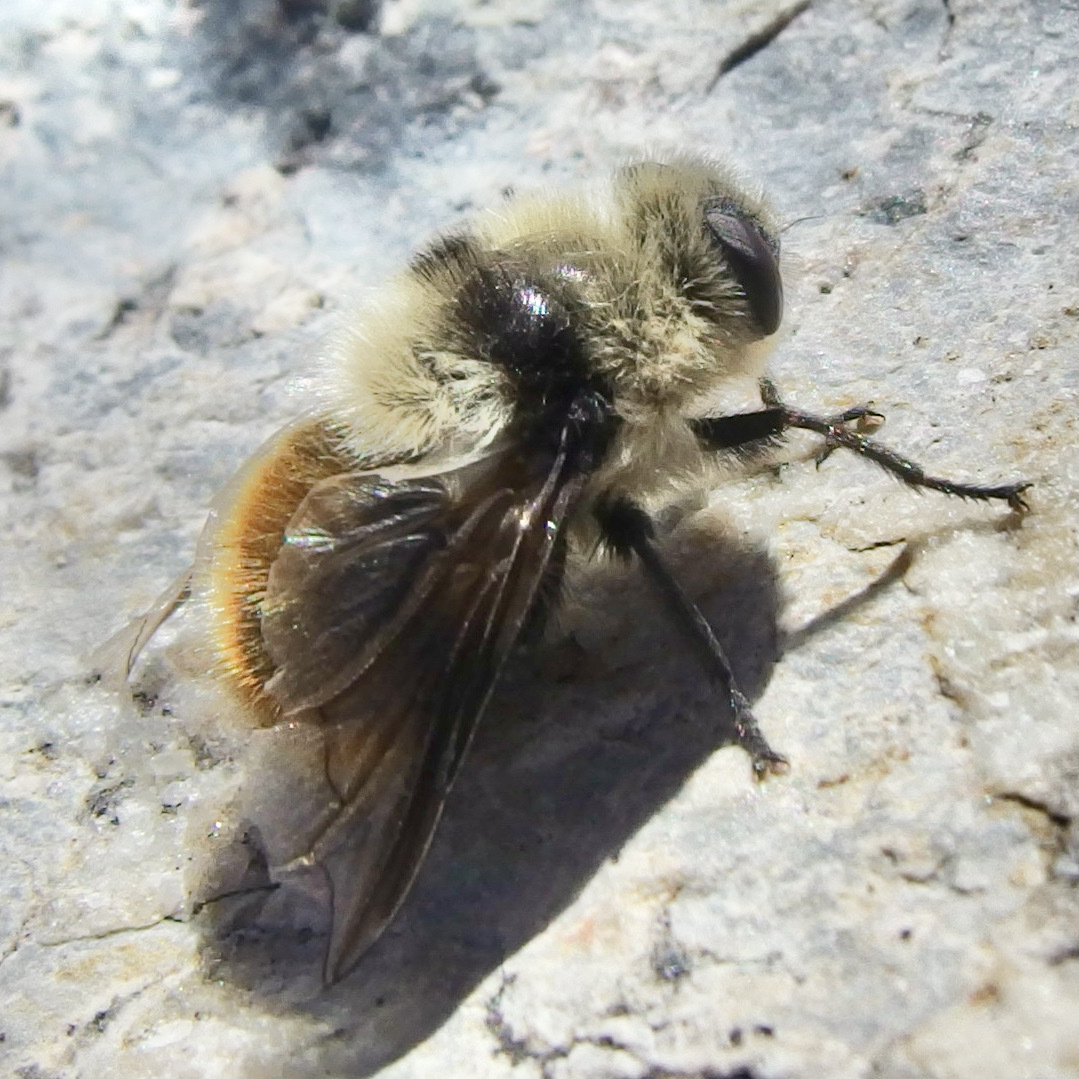
- Image of Cephenemyia pratti

Scientific classification
- Kingdom: Animalia
- Phylum: Arthropoda
- Class: Insecta
- Order: Diptera
- Family: Oestridae
- Genus: Cephenemyia
- Species: C. pratti

Binomial name
- Cephenemyia pratti Hunter, 1916

= Cephenemyia pratti =

Species of fly

Cephenemyia pratti is a species of nose bot flies in the family Oestridae.
