= Xanthommatin reductase =

Class of enzymes

xanthommatin reductase

Identifiers
- EC no.: 1.3.1.41
- CAS no.: 62972-27-4

Databases
- IntEnz: IntEnz view
- BRENDA: BRENDA entry
- ExPASy: NiceZyme view
- KEGG: KEGG entry
- MetaCyc: metabolic pathway
- PRIAM: profile
- PDB structures: RCSB PDB PDBe PDBsum
- Gene Ontology: AmiGO / QuickGO
Search
- PMC: articles
- PubMed: articles
- NCBI: proteins

In enzymology, a xanthommatin reductase (EC 1.3.1.41) is an enzyme that catalyzes the chemical reaction

5,12-dihydroxanthommatin + NAD^{+} $\rightleftharpoons$ xanthommatin + NADH + H^{+}

Thus, the two substrates of this enzyme are 5,12-dihydroxanthommatin and NAD^{+}, whereas its three products are xanthommatin, NADH, and H^{+}.

This enzyme belongs to the family of oxidoreductases, specifically those acting on the CH-CH group of donor with NAD+ or NADP+ as acceptor. The systematic name of this enzyme class is 5,12-dihydroxanthommatin:NAD+ oxidoreductase.
