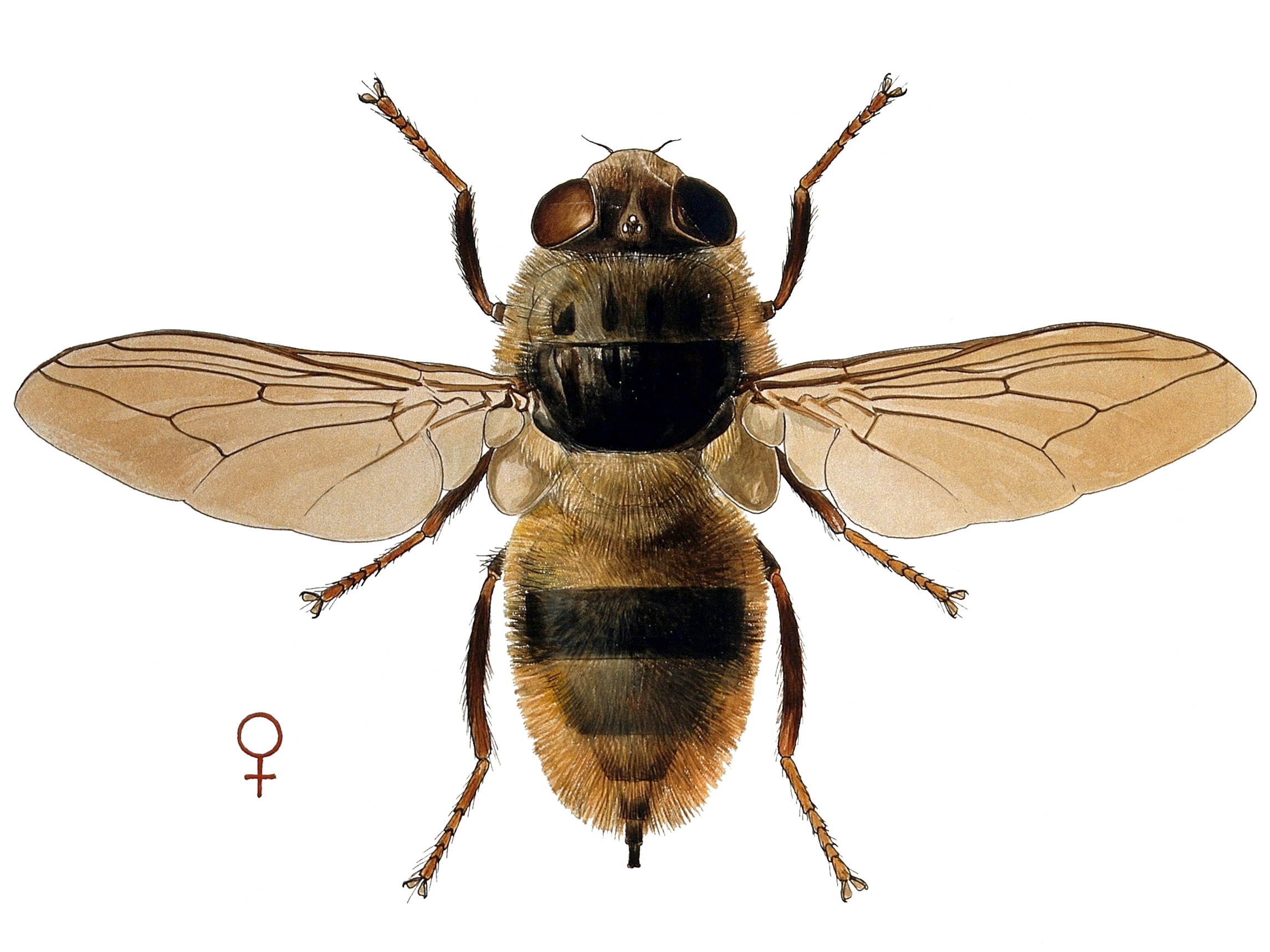
- Ox warble fly (Hypoderma bovis)
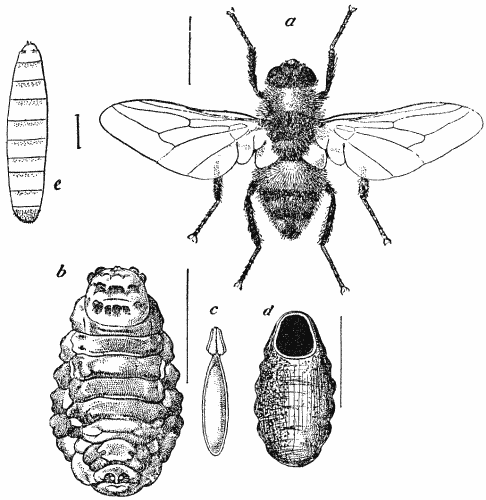
- Life cycle

Scientific classification
- Kingdom: Animalia
- Phylum: Arthropoda
- Clade: Pancrustacea
- Class: Insecta
- Order: Diptera
- Family: Oestridae
- Subfamily: Hypodermatinae
- Genus: Hypoderma; Latreille, 1818

Species
- H. actaeon; H. bovis (Linnaeus, 1758); H. diana; H. lineatum (Viller, 1789); H. sinense; H. tarandi (Linnaeus, 1758)

= Warble fly =

Warble flies

Genus of flies

Warble fly is a name given to the genus Hypoderma: large flies which are parasitic on cattle and deer. Other names include "heel flies", "bomb flies" and "gadflies", while their larvae are often called "cattle grubs" or "wolves." Common species of warble fly include Hypoderma bovis (the ox warble fly) and Hypoderma lineatum (the cattle warble fly) and Hypoderma tarandi (the reindeer warble fly). Larvae of Hypoderma species also have been reported in horses, sheep, goats and humans. They have also been found on smaller mammals such as dogs, cats, squirrels, voles and rabbits.

Adult warble flies are large, hairy and bumblebee-like and brown, orange or yellow in color. The adults have vestigial mouthparts, so they cannot feed during their short lifespans, which can be as little as five days.

They are found on all continents of the Northern Hemisphere, mainly between 25° and 60° latitude.

== Infestations ==
The fly lays eggs on the forelegs of large animals. The eggs hatch within a week and penetrate the skin, where they migrate throughout the connective tissues (H. bovis) or to the esophagus (H. lineatum). After a few months, the larvae travel back to the skin surface and cause swellings called "warbles". They remain under the skin, and when destroyed by pressure, the larvae can cause large purulent swellings, or anaphylaxis. Upon emergence, the fly leaves holes in the skin. Large numbers of such punctures can render cattle hides valueless.

The migrating larvae can cause damage to meat, as the tunnels they make in the muscle fill with a substance known as "butcher's jelly". Infestations also hinder weight gain and growth in the animals. Milk yields may also decline. Most infections in adult cows are minor, due to immunity developed over time.

=== Humans ===
In humans, the disease intracerebral myiasis is a rare infestation of the brain by the larva of H. bovis. It penetrates the brain by an unknown mode and causes symptoms such as convulsions and intracerebral hematoma. The first case of human warble fly infection in Britain (to a four-year-old boy on a farm near South Brent, Devon) was reported in the British Medical Journal in June 1924 by Dr Frederick William Style Other cases appear in medical literature. Myiasis of the human eye can be caused by H. tarandi, a parasite of reindeer. It is known to cause uveitis, glaucoma and retinal detachment. H. lineatum and H. sinense may also infest humans.

== Treatment and prevention ==
Warble flies have been eradicated in many countries, beginning with Denmark and West Germany, in the 1960s. They were eradicated in the United Kingdom in 1990. It may have been eradicated from Belgium. The warble fly remains present in North Africa.

From the 1980s, the preventive treatment is easier, by subcutaneous use of mainly long acting ivermectin formulations, but administration of ivermectin is strongly discouraged later than 8–12 weeks before the anticipated first appearance of grubs on the back, because adverse reactions may occur when migrating larvae are killed, like severe inflammation linked to putrefaction of dead larvae in their resting sites.

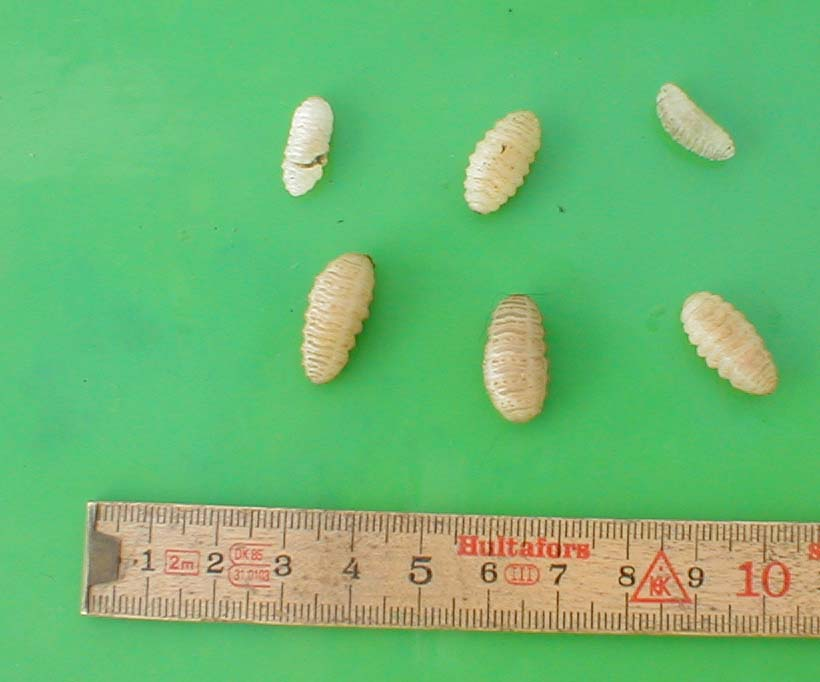
Warble fly larvae

== See also ==
- Botfly
- Horse-fly
- Hypodermyasis
