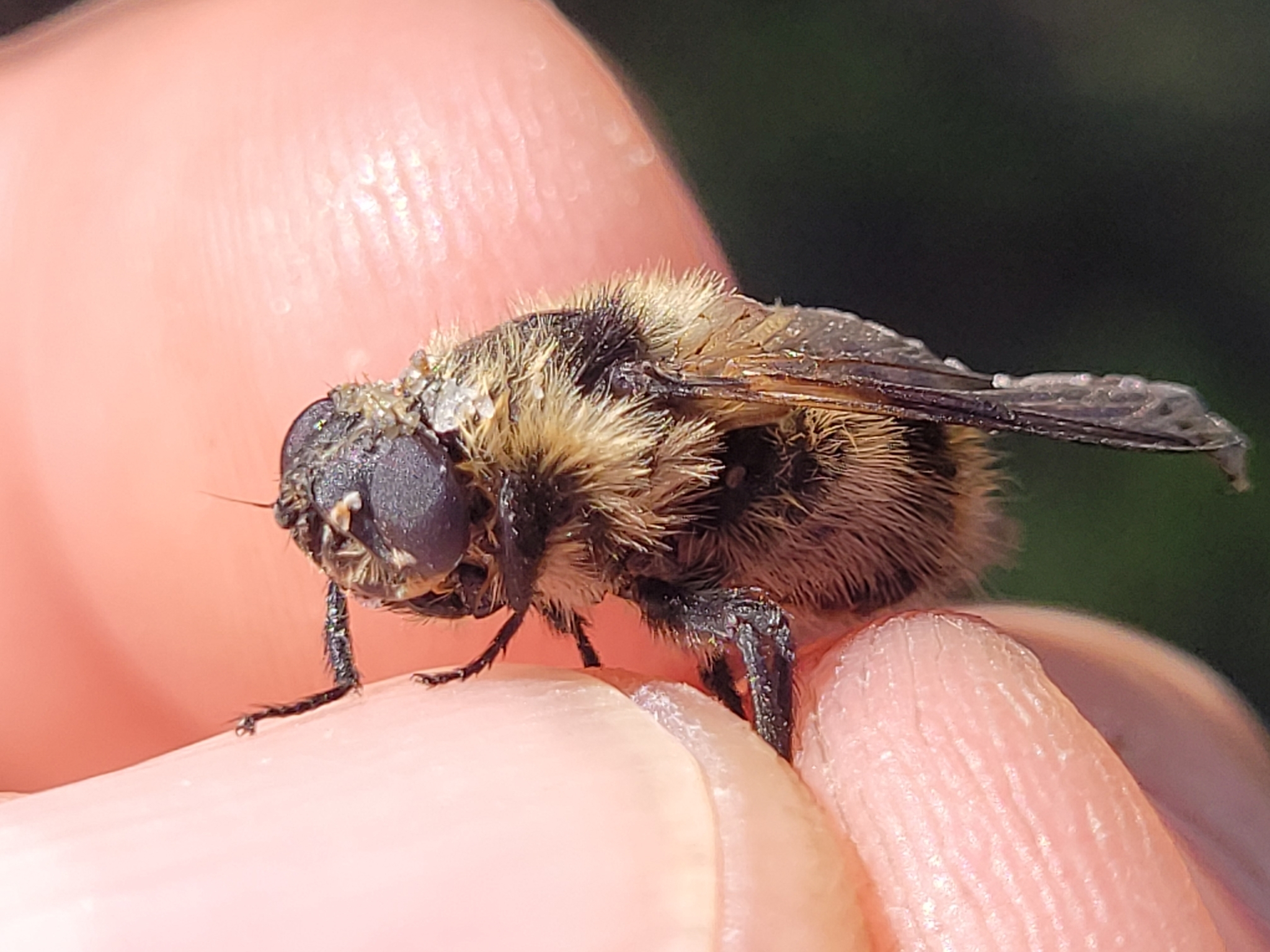

Scientific classification
- Domain: Eukaryota
- Kingdom: Animalia
- Phylum: Arthropoda
- Class: Insecta
- Order: Diptera
- Family: Oestridae
- Genus: Cephenemyia
- Species: C. apicata

Binomial name
- Cephenemyia apicata Bennett & Sabrosky, 1962

= Cephenemyia apicata =

Species of fly

Cephenemyia apicata is a species of nose bot flies in the family Oestridae. Its larvae are parasites of the Columbian black-tailed deer, and in their first instar can be found in the deer's lungs. Adults typically mate from April through late July.
