= Cephenemyia jellisoni =

Scientific classification
- Domain: Eukaryota
- Kingdom: Animalia
- Phylum: Arthropoda
- Class: Insecta
- Order: Diptera
- Family: Oestridae
- Genus: Cephenemyia
- Species: C. jellisoni

Binomial name
- Cephenemyia jellisoni Townsend, 1941

Species of fly

Cephenemyia jellisoni is a species of nose bot fly in the family Oestridae.
