= Adolph Modéer =

Swedish scientist and academic (1739–1799)

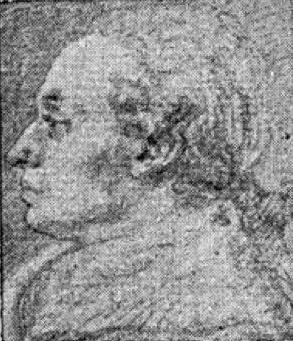
Adolf Modéer

Adolph Modéer (15 April 1739 – 16 July 1799) was a Swedish surveyor, economic historian and naturalist.

== Biography ==
Modéer was born at Karlskrona, Sweden. He became a student at Lund University in 1754.

Modéer worked as a surveyor from 1755, and was Secretary of the Medical Society at Stockholm and from 1786 a member of the Royal Swedish Academy of Sciences. As a naturalist he was mainly interested in malacology and entomology. He also worked on jellyfish. As an economic historian, he wrote on the history of Sweden's trade.

== Selected works ==
- Någre märkvärdigheter hos insectet Cimex ovatus pallide-griseus, abdominis lateribus albo nigroque variis, alis albis, basi scutelli nigricante. – Kongliga Vetenskaps Academiens Handlingar 25 (1–3): 41–47, Tab. II [= 2]. Stockholm. (1764).
- Bibliotheca helminthologica, seu Enumeratio auctorum qui de vermibus scilicet eryptozois, gymnodelis, testaceis atque phytozoois tam vivis quam petrificatis scripserunt edita ab Adolpho Modeer (J.J. Palmium, Erlangen, 1786).
- Styng-Flug-Slägtet (Oestrus). – Kongliga Vetenskaps Academiens Nya Handlingar 7 (4–6, 7–9): 125–158, 180–185. Stockholm (1786).
- Slägtet Pipmask, Tubipora. – Kongliga Vetenskaps Academiens Nya Handlingar 9 (7–9): 219–239, 241–251, Tab. VII [= 7]. Stockholm (1788).
- Om Slägtet Trumpetmask, Triton. – Kongliga Vetenskaps Academiens Nya Handlingar 10 (1–3): 52–56, Tab. II [= 2]. Stockholm (1789).
