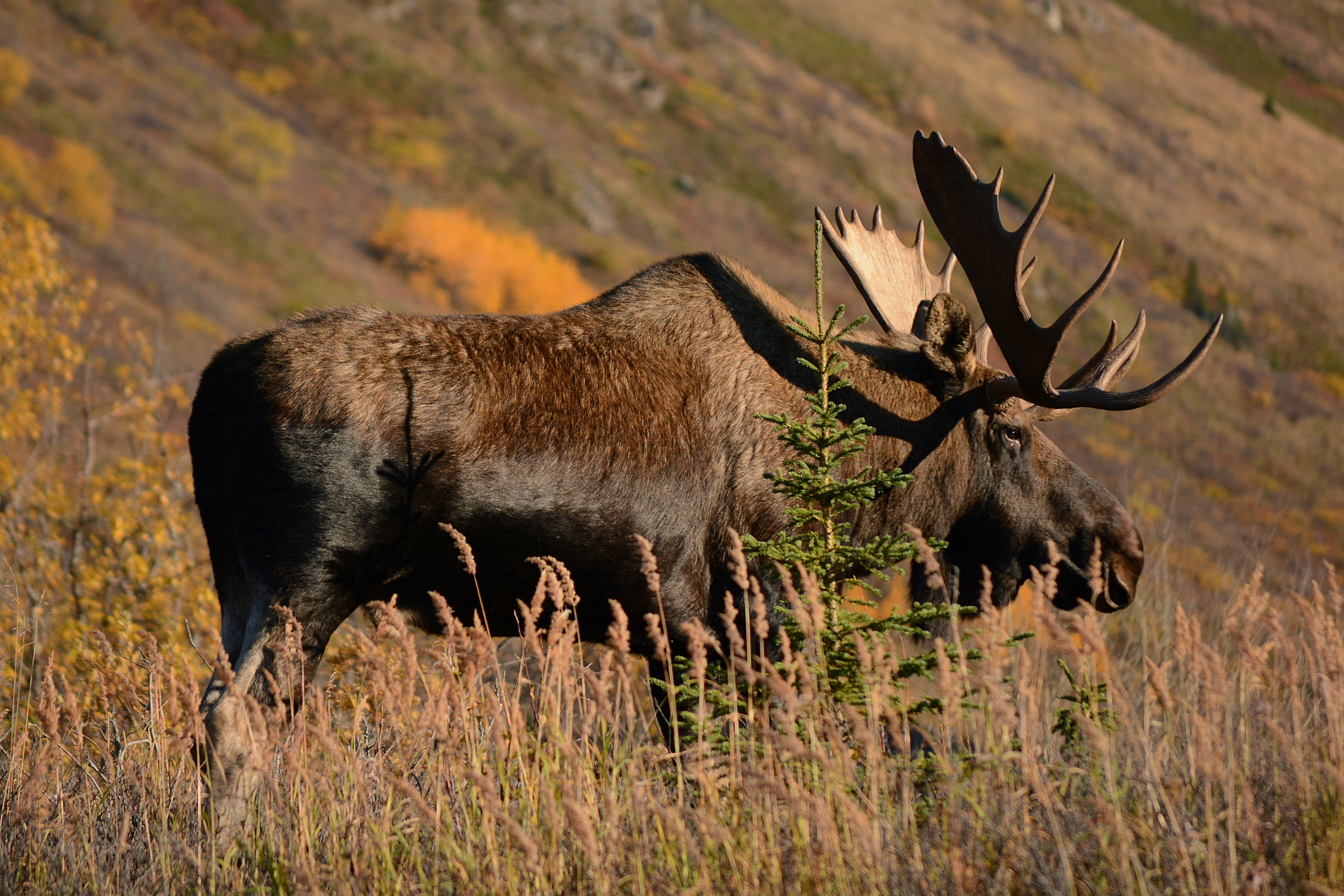
- A bull (male) moose in Alaska, US
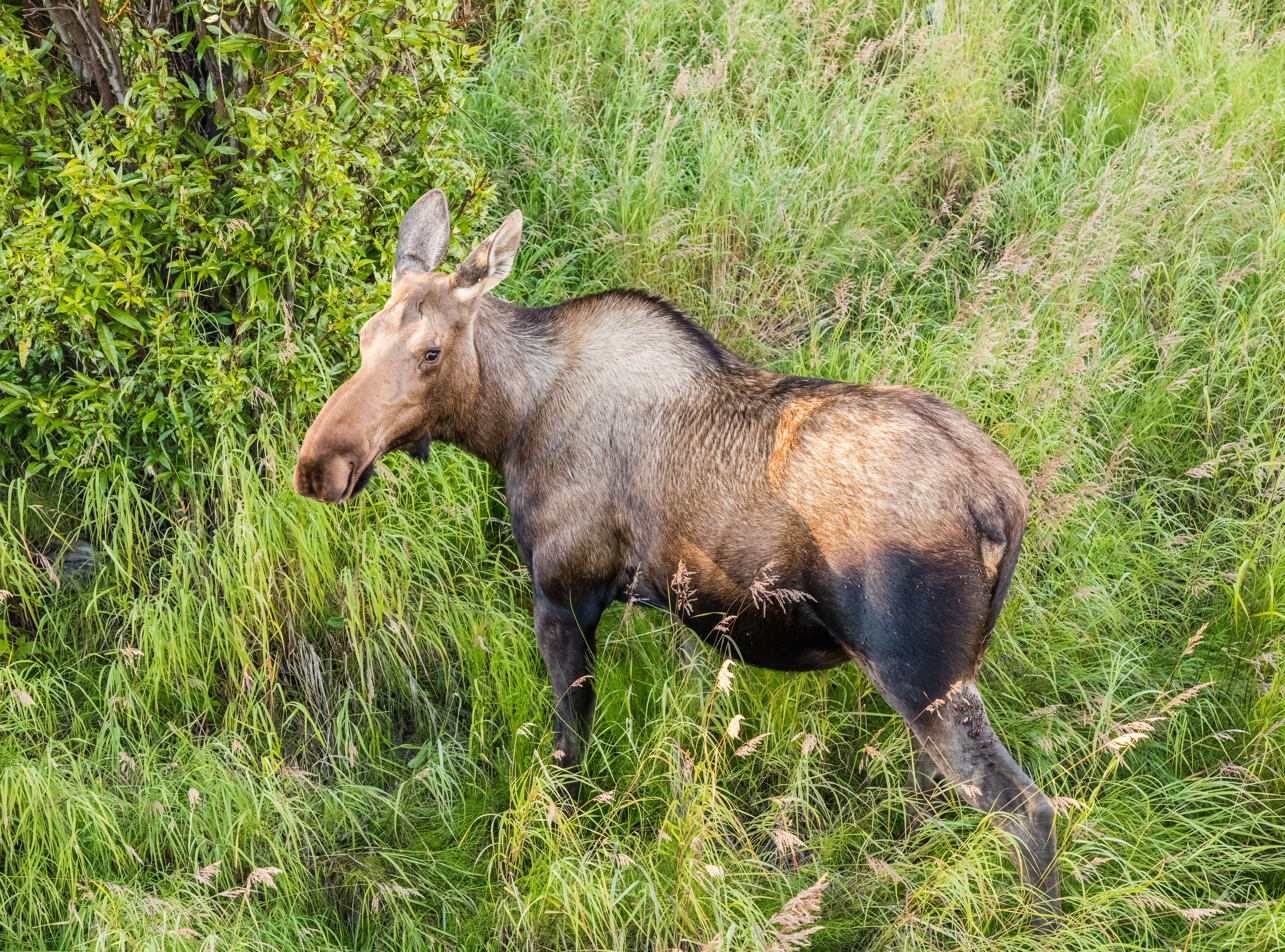
- A cow (female) moose in Alaska, US

Conservation status
- Least Concern (IUCN 3.1)

- Secure (NatureServe)

Scientific classification
- Kingdom: Animalia
- Phylum: Chordata
- Class: Mammalia
- Order: Artiodactyla
- Family: Cervidae
- Subfamily: Capreolinae
- Tribe: Alceini
- Genus: Alces
- Species: A. alces

Binomial name
- Alces alces (Linnaeus, 1758)
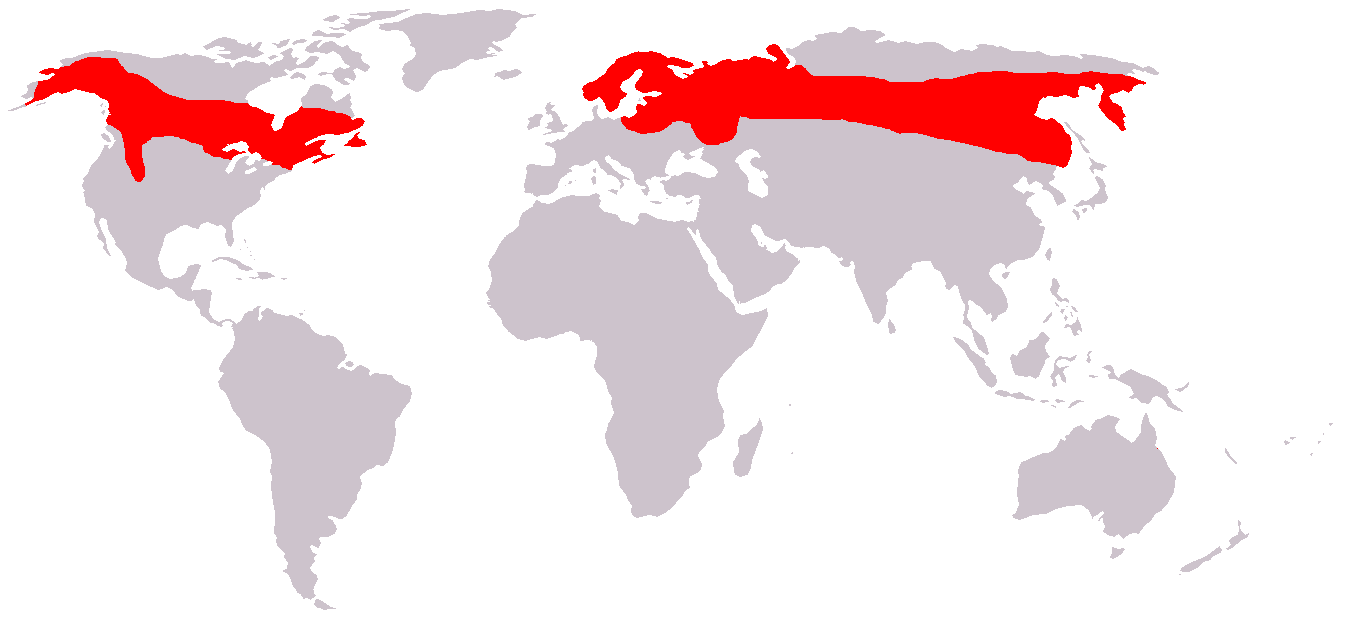
- current range

Synonyms
- Cervus alces Linnaeus, 1758

= Moose =

Moose Temporal range: Piacenzian–Present

Largest species of deer

The moose (Note: pl.: moose; used in North America) or elk (Note: pl.: elk or elks; used in Eurasia) (Alces alces) is the world's tallest, largest and heaviest extant species of deer and the only extant species in the genus Alces. It is also the tallest, and the second-largest, land animal in North America, falling short only to the American bison in body mass. Most adult male moose have broad, palmate ("open-hand shaped") antlers; most other members of the deer family have pointed antlers with a dendritic ("twig-like") configuration. Moose inhabit the circumpolar boreal forests or temperate broadleaf and mixed forests of the Northern Hemisphere, thriving in cooler, temperate areas as well as subarctic climates.

Hunting shaped the relationship between moose and humans, both in Eurasia and North America. Prior to the early modern period (around 1600–1700), moose were one of many valuable sources of sustenance for certain North American Indians. Hunting and habitat loss have reduced the moose's range; this fragmentation has led to sightings of "urban moose" in some areas. The moose has been reintroduced to some of its former habitats. Currently, the greatest populations occur in Canada. Additionally, substantial numbers are found in Alaska, the northern states of the contiguous United States, Fennoscandia, the Baltic states, the Caucasus region, Poland, Eastern Europe, Mongolia, Kazakhstan, and Russia.

Predominantly a browser, the moose's diet consists of both terrestrial and aquatic vegetation, depending on the season, with branches, twigs and dead wood making up a large portion of their winter diet. Predators of moose include wolves, bears, humans, wolverines (rarely, though may take calves), and (rarely, if swimming in the ocean) orcas. Unlike most other deer species, moose do not form herds and are solitary animals, aside from calves who remain with their mother until the cow begins estrus again (typically 18 months after the birth of a calf). At this point, the cow chases her calf away. Although generally slow-moving and sedentary, moose can become defensively aggressive, and move very quickly if angered or startled. Their mating season in the autumn features energetic fights between males competing for a female.

Moose have played a prominent role in the culture of people in the Northern Hemisphere. Evidence suggests they were hunted by humans as far back as the most recent Ice Age.

== Etymology ==
Alces alces is normally called an "elk" in European contexts and a "moose" in North American contexts. The former is the older word in English, deriving from Proto-Germanic *elho- or *elhon-. In North America it has been transferred to an entirely different species, Cervus canadensis. The latter word was borrowed from an Algonquian language in the 17th century (cf. Narragansett moos and Eastern Abenaki mos). According to James Hammond Trumbull, the etymon is moosu, meaning "he trims or cuts smooth", with reference to the animal's habit of stripping twigs and bark from trees.

A mature male moose is called a bull, a mature female a cow, and an immature moose of either sex a calf.

== Description ==
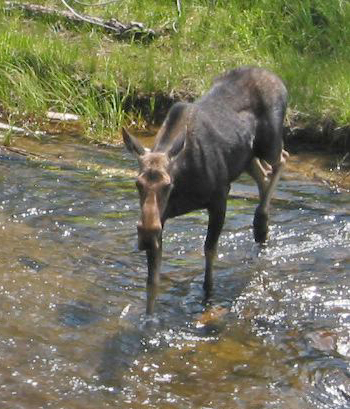
Crossing a river

On average, an adult moose stands 1.4–2.1 m (4.6–6.9 ft) high at the shoulder, which is more than 30 cm (1 ft) higher than the next-largest deer on average, the wapiti. The tail is short (6–8 cm (2.4–3.1 in) in length) and vestigial in appearance; unlike other ungulates the moose tail is too short to swish away insects. Males (or "bulls") normally weigh from 380 to 700 kg (838 to 1,543 lb) and females (or "cows") typically weigh 200 to 490 kg (441 to 1,080 lb), depending on racial or clinal as well as individual age or nutritional variations. The head-and-body length is 2.4–3.1 m (7 ft 10 in – 10 ft 2 in), with the vestigial tail adding only a further 5–12 cm (2–4 1/2 in). The largest subspecies is the Alaskan moose (A. a. gigas), which can stand over 2.1 m (6 ft 11 in) at the shoulder, has a span across the antlers of 1.8 m (5 ft 11 in) and averages 634.5 kg (1,399 lb) in males and 478 kg (1,054 lb) in females. Typically, however, the antlers of a mature bull are between 1.2 and 1.5 m (3 ft 11 in and 4 ft 11 in). The largest confirmed size for this species was a bull shot at the Yukon River in September 1897 that weighed 820 kg (1,808 lb) and measured 2.33 m (7 ft 8 in) high at the shoulder. There have been reported cases of even larger moose, including a bull killed in 2004 that weighed 1,043 kg (2,299 lb), and a bull that reportedly scaled 1,180 kg (2,601 lb), but none are authenticated and some may not be considered reliable.

=== Antlers ===
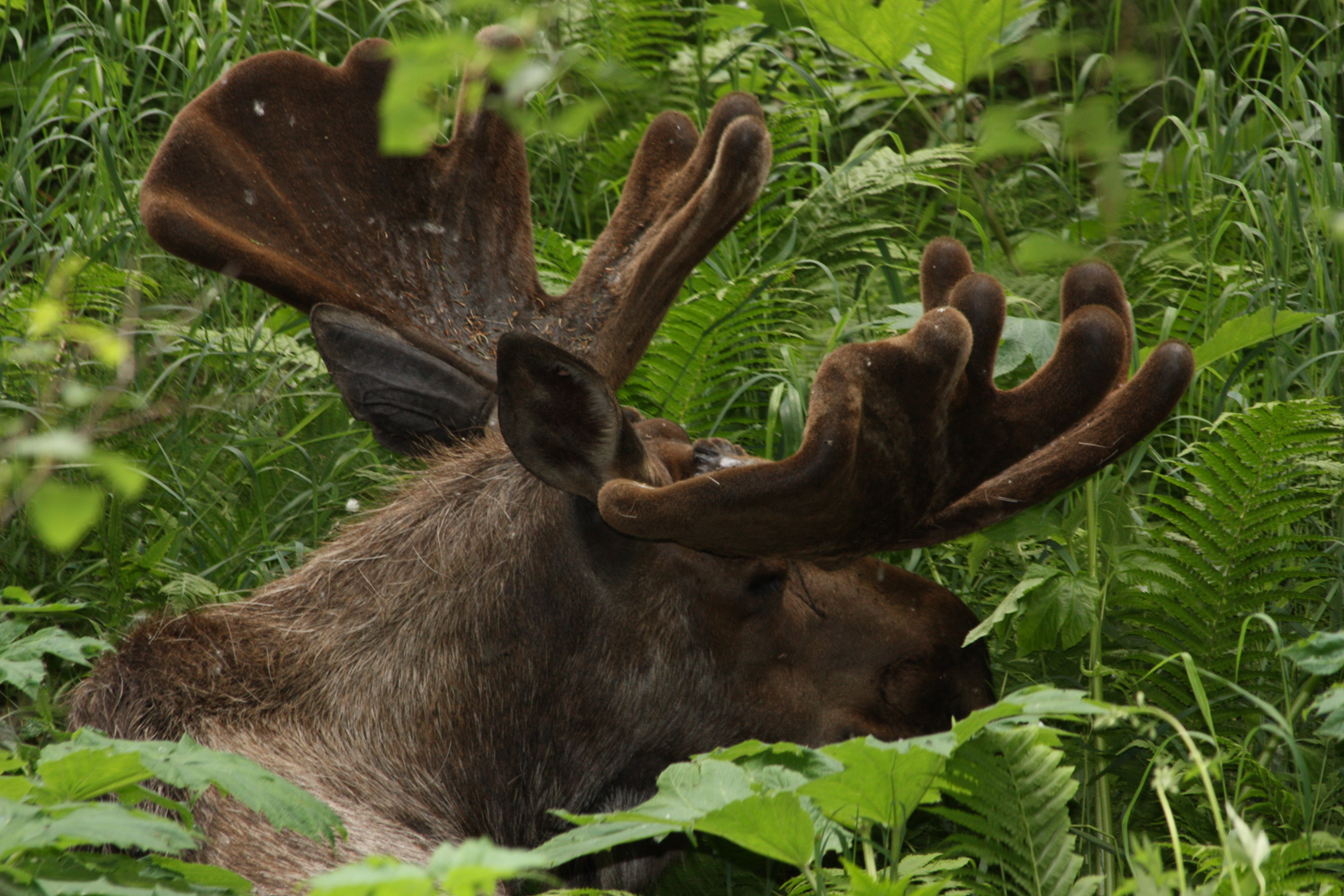
Growing antlers are covered with a soft, furry covering called "velvet". Blood vessels in the velvet transport nutrients to support antler growth.

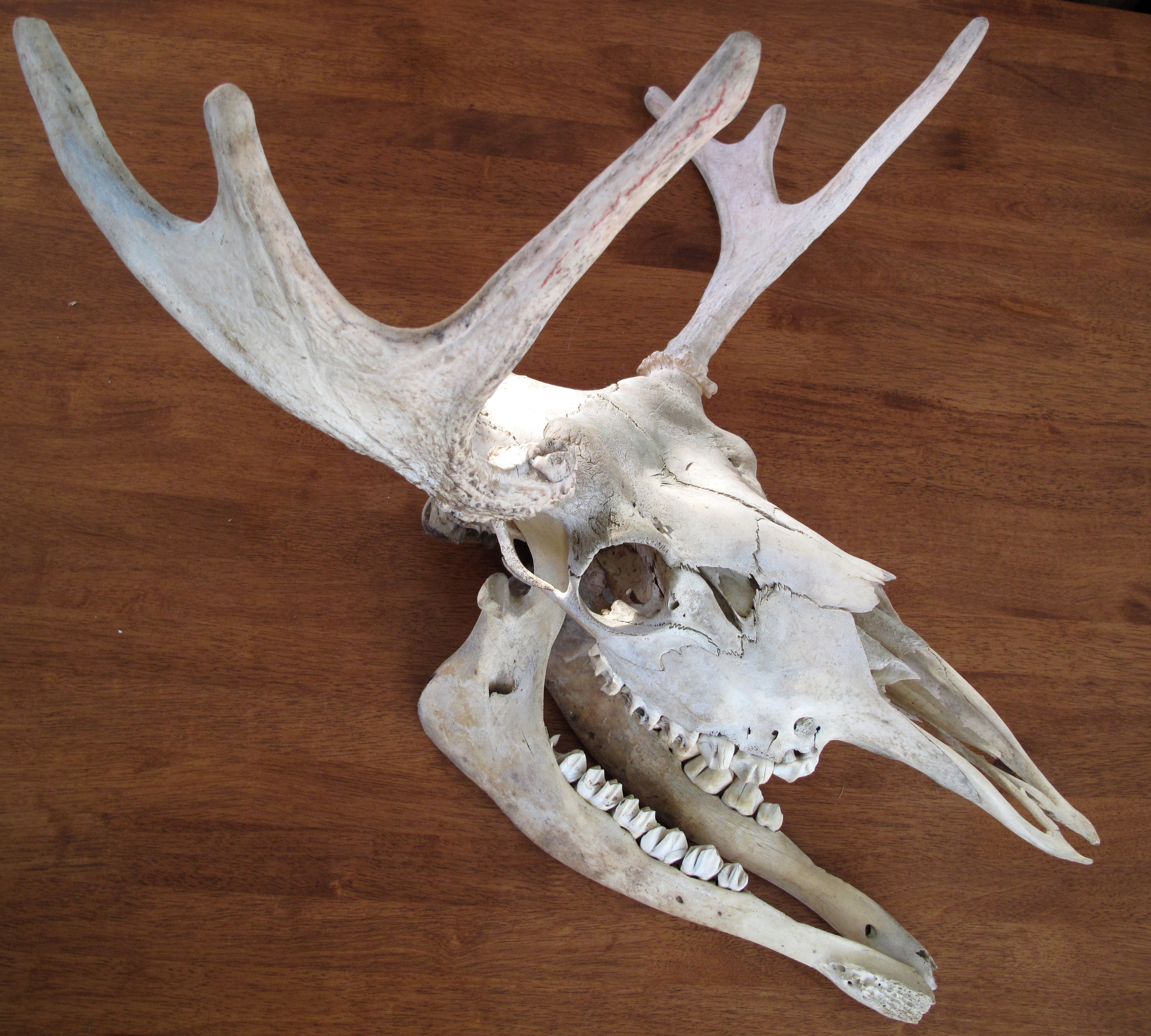
Skull of a moose

Bull moose have antlers like other members of the deer family. The size and growth rate of antlers is determined by diet and age. Size and symmetry in the number of antler points signals bull moose health and cows may select mates based on antler size and symmetry. Bull moose use their antlers to display dominance, to discourage competition, and to spar or fight rivals.

The male's antlers grow as cylindrical beams projecting on each side of the head at right angles to the midline of the skull, and then fork. The lower prong of this fork may be either simple, or divided into two or three tines, with some flattening. Most moose have antlers that are broad and palmate (flat) with tines (points) along the outer edge. Within the ecologic range of the moose in Europe, northern populations display the palmate pattern of antlers, while the antlers of European moose residing the southerly portion of its range are typically of the cervina dendritic pattern and comparatively small, perhaps due to evolutionary pressures of hunting by humans, who prize the large palmate antlers. European moose with antlers intermediate between the palmate and the dendritic form are found in the middle of the north-south range. Moose with antlers have more acute hearing than those without antlers; a study of trophy antlers using a microphone found that the palmate antler acts as a parabolic reflector, amplifying sound at the moose's ear.

The antlers of mature Alaskan adult bull moose (5 to 12 years old) have a maximum spread greater than 2 m (6.6 ft). By the age of 13, moose antlers decline in size and symmetry. The widest spread recorded was 2.1 m (6.9 ft) across. An Alaskan moose also holds the record for the heaviest weight at 36 kilograms (79 lb).

Antler beam diameter, not the number of tines, indicates age. In North America, moose (A. a. americanus) antlers are usually larger than those of Eurasian moose and have two lobes on each side, like a butterfly. Eurasian moose antlers resemble a seashell, with a single lobe on each side. In the North Siberian moose (A. a. bedfordiae), the posterior division of the main fork divides into three tines, with no distinct flattening. In the common moose (A. a. alces) this branch usually expands into a broad palmation, with one large tine at the base and a number of smaller snags on the free border. There is, however, a Scandinavian breed of the common moose in which the antlers are simpler and recall those of the East Siberian animals. The palmation appears to be more marked in North American moose than in the typical Scandinavian moose.

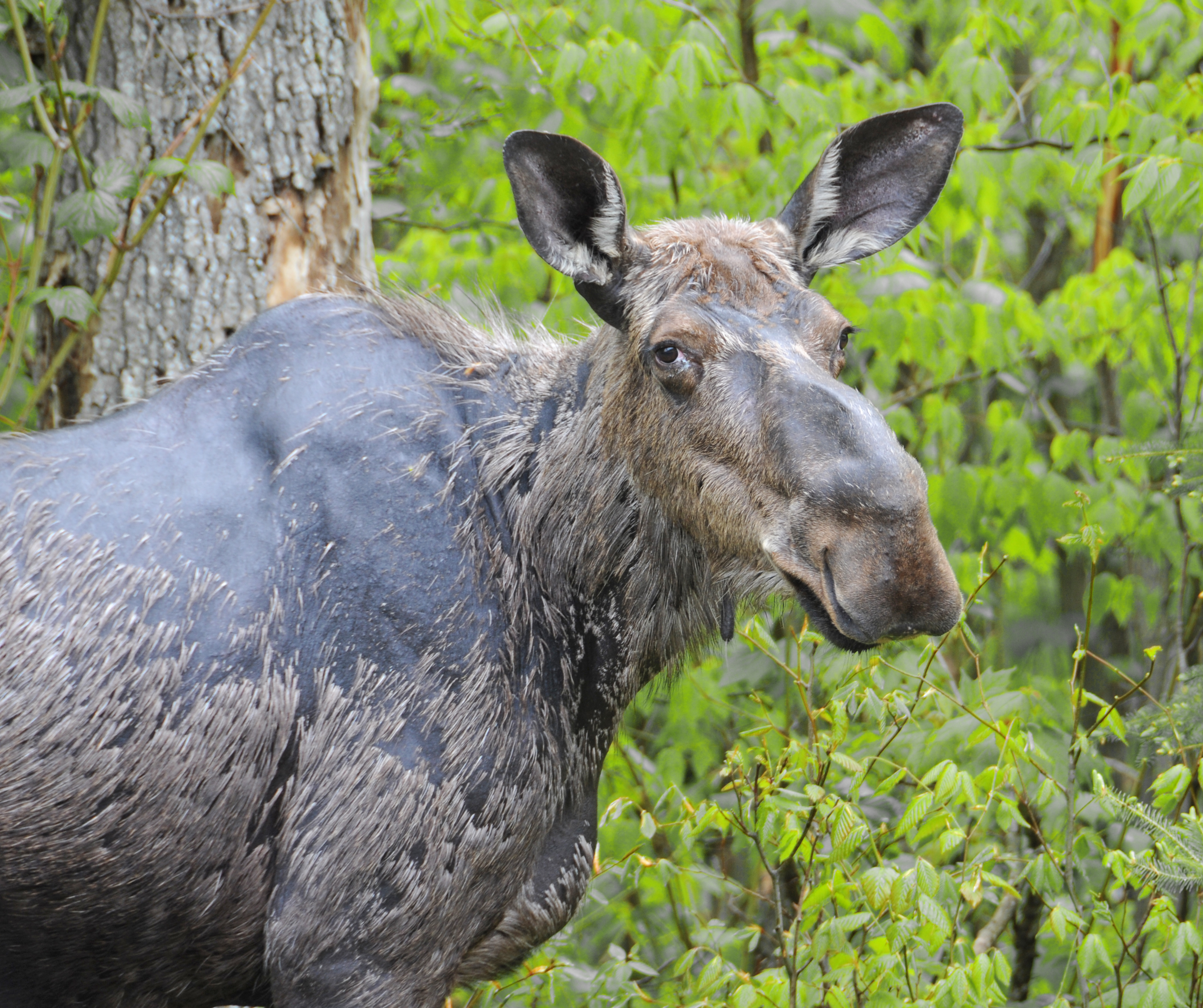
Young female (A. a. americana) in early June

After the mating season males drop their antlers to conserve energy for the winter. A new set of antlers will then regrow in the spring. Antlers take three to five months to fully develop, making them one of the fastest growing animal organs. Antler growth is "nourished by an extensive system of blood vessels in the skin covering, which contains numerous hair follicles that give it a 'velvet' texture." This requires intense grazing on a highly-nutritious diet. By September the velvet is removed by rubbing and thrashing which changes the colour of the antlers. Immature bulls may not shed their antlers for the winter, but retain them until the following spring. Birds, carnivores and rodents eat dropped antlers as they are full of protein and moose themselves will eat antler velvet for the nutrients.

If a bull moose is castrated, either by accidental or chemical means, he will shed his current set of antlers within two weeks and then immediately begin to grow a new set of misshapen and deformed antlers that he will wear the rest of his life without ever shedding again; similarly deformed antlers can result from a deficiency of testosterone caused by cryptorchidism or old age. These deformed antlers are composed of living bone which is still growing or able to grow, since testosterone is needed to stop antler growth; they may take one of two forms. "Cactus antlers" or velericorn antlers usually retain the approximate shape of a normal moose's antlers but have numerous pearl-shaped exostoses on their surface; being made of living bone, they are easily broken but can grow back. Perukes (US: /pəˈruːks/) are constantly growing, tumor-like antlers with a distinctive appearance similar to coral. Like roe deer, moose are more likely to develop perukes, rather than cactus antlers, than the more developed cervine deer, but unlike roe deer, moose do not suffer fatal decalcification of the skull as a result of peruke growth, but rather can support their continued growth until they become too large to be fully supplied with blood. The distinctive-looking perukes (often referred to as "devil's antlers") are the source of several myths and legends among many groups of Inuit as well as several other tribes of indigenous peoples of North America.

In extremely rare circumstances, a cow moose may grow antlers. This is usually attributed to a hormone imbalance.

=== Proboscis and olfaction ===
The moose proboscis is distinctive among living cervids due to its large size; it also features nares that can be sealed shut when the moose is browsing aquatic vegetation. The moose proboscis likely evolved as an adaptation to aquatic browsing, with loss of the rhinarium, and development of a superior olfactory column separate from an inferior respiratory column. This separation contributes to the moose's keen sense of smell, which they employ to detect water sources, to find food under snow, and to detect mates or predators.

=== Hooves ===
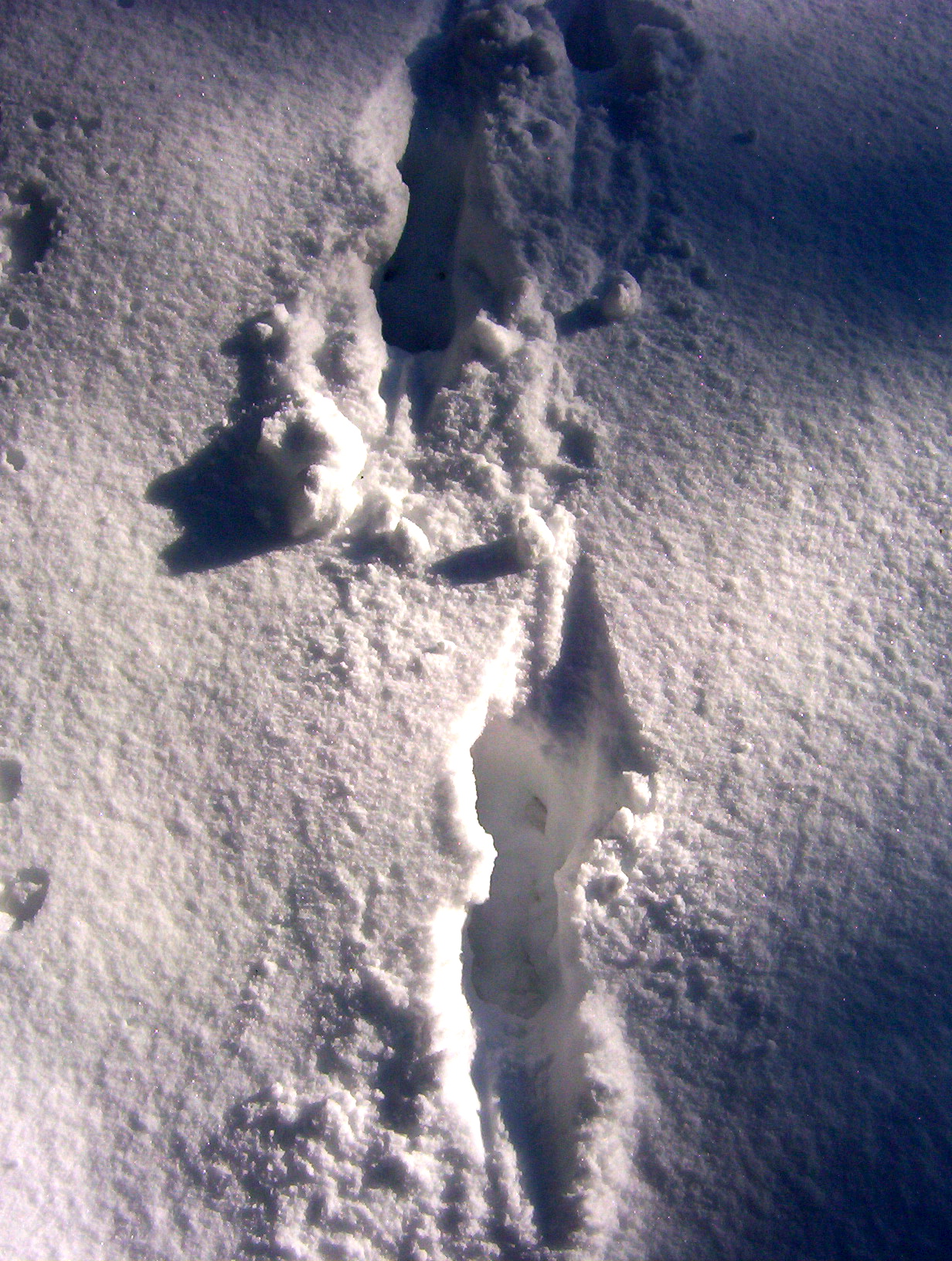
Long legs allow moose to wade easily through deep water or snow.

As with all members of the order Artiodactyla (even-toed ungulates), moose feet have two large keratinized hooves corresponding to the third and fourth toe, with two small posterolateral dewclaws (vestigial digits), corresponding to the second and fifth toe. The hoof of the fourth digit is broader than that of the third digit, while the inner hoof of the third digit is longer than that of the fourth digit. This foot configuration may favor striding on soft ground. The moose hoof splays under load, increasing surface area, which limits sinking of the moose foot into soft ground or snow, and which increases efficiency when swimming. The body weight per footprint surface area of the moose foot is intermediate between that of the pronghorn foot, (which have stiff feet lacking dewclaws—optimized for high-speed running) and the caribou foot (which are more rounded with large dewclaws, optimized for walking in deep snow). The moose's body weight per surface area of footprint is about twice that of the caribou.

=== Skin and fur ===
Moose skin is typical of the deer family. Moose fur consists of four types of hair: eyelashes, whiskers, guard hairs and wool hairs. Hair length and hair density varies according to season, age, and body region. The coat has two layers—a top layer of long guard hairs and a soft wooly undercoat. The guard hairs are hollow and filled with air for better insulation, which also helps them stay afloat when swimming.

=== Dewlap ===
Both male and female moose have a dewlap or bell, which is a fold of skin under the chin. Its exact function is unknown, but some morphologic analyses suggest a cooling (thermoregulatory) function. Other theories include a fitness signal in mating, as a visual and olfactory signal, or as a dominance signal by males, as are the antlers.

== Ecology and biology ==
=== Diet ===
Moose mate

The moose is a browsing herbivore and is capable of consuming many types of plant or fruit. The average adult moose needs to consume 96 megajoules (23,000 kilocalories) per day to maintain its body weight. Much of a moose's energy is derived from terrestrial vegetation, mainly consisting of forbs and other non-grasses, and fresh shoots from trees such as willow and birch. As these terrestrial plants are rather low in sodium, as much as half of its diet usually consists of aquatic plants, including lilies and pondweed, which while lower in energy content, provide the moose with its sodium requirements. In winter, moose are often drawn to roadways, to lick salt that is used as a snow and ice melter. A typical moose, weighing 360 kg (794 lb), can eat up to 32 kg (71 lb) of food per day.

Moose lack upper front teeth, but have eight sharp incisors on the lower jaw. They also have a tough tongue, lips and gums, which aid in the eating of woody vegetation. Moose have six pairs of large, flat molars and, ahead of those, six pairs of premolars, to grind up their food. A moose's upper lip is very sensitive, to help distinguish between fresh shoots and harder twigs, and is prehensile, for grasping their food. In the summer, moose may use this prehensile lip for grabbing branches and pulling, stripping the entire branch of leaves in a single mouthful, or for pulling forbs, like dandelions, or aquatic plants up by the base, roots and all. A moose's diet often depends on its location, but they seem to prefer the new growths from deciduous trees with a high sugar content, such as white birch, trembling aspen and striped maple, among many others. To reach high branches, a moose may bend small saplings down, using its prehensile lip, mouth or body. For larger trees a moose may stand erect and walk upright on its hind legs, allowing it to reach branches up to 4.26 meters (14 ft 0 in) or higher above the ground. Moose may consume ferns from time to time.

Moose are excellent swimmers and are known to wade into water to eat aquatic plants. This trait serves a second purpose in cooling down the moose on summer days and ridding itself of black flies. Moose are thus attracted to marshes and river banks during warmer months as both provide suitable vegetation to eat and water to wet themselves in. Moose have been known to dive over 5.5 metres (18 ft) to reach plants on lake bottoms, and the complex snout may assist the moose in this type of feeding. Moose are the only deer that are capable of feeding underwater. As an adaptation for feeding on plants underwater, the nose is equipped with fatty pads and muscles that close the nostrils when exposed to water pressure, preventing water from entering the nose. Other species can pluck plants from the water too, but these need to raise their heads in order to swallow.

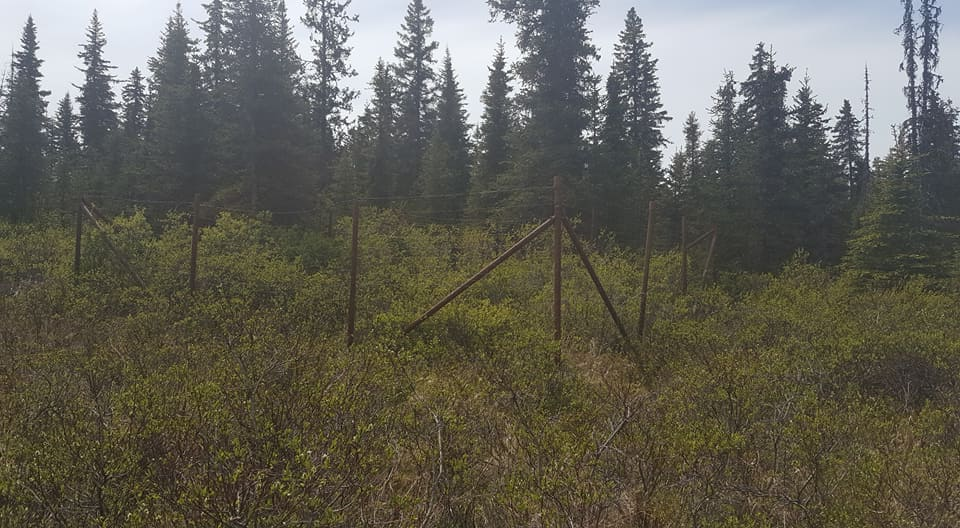
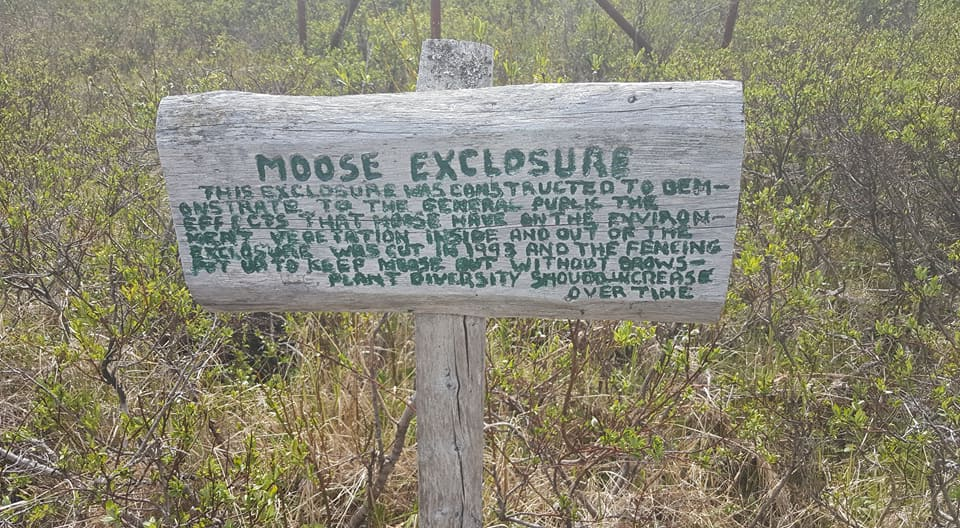
This fenced-in area is part of a long-term research project to examine the effects of moose browsing on plant biodiversity.

Moose are not grazing animals but browsers (concentrate selectors), and their diet varies on a continuum between soft-leaf browsing and browsing of lignified plant matter. Like giraffes, moose carefully select foods with less fiber and more concentrations of nutrients. Thus, the moose's digestive system has evolved to accommodate this relatively low-fiber diet. Unlike most hooved, domesticated animals (ruminants), moose cannot digest hay, and feeding it to a moose can be fatal. The moose's varied and complex diet is typically expensive for humans to provide, and free-range moose require a lot of forested hectarage for sustainable survival, which is one of the main reasons moose have never been widely domesticated.

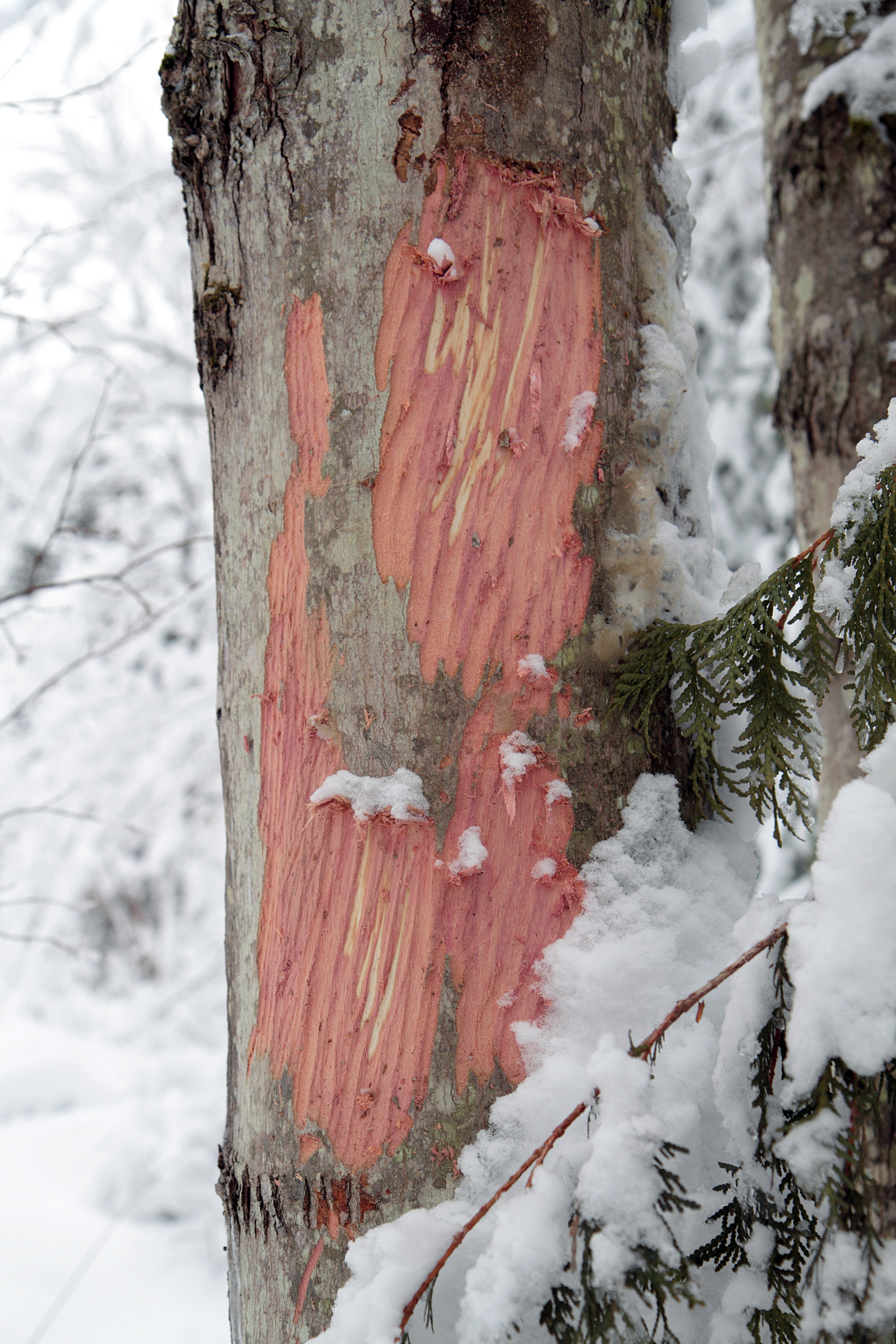
Bark stripping

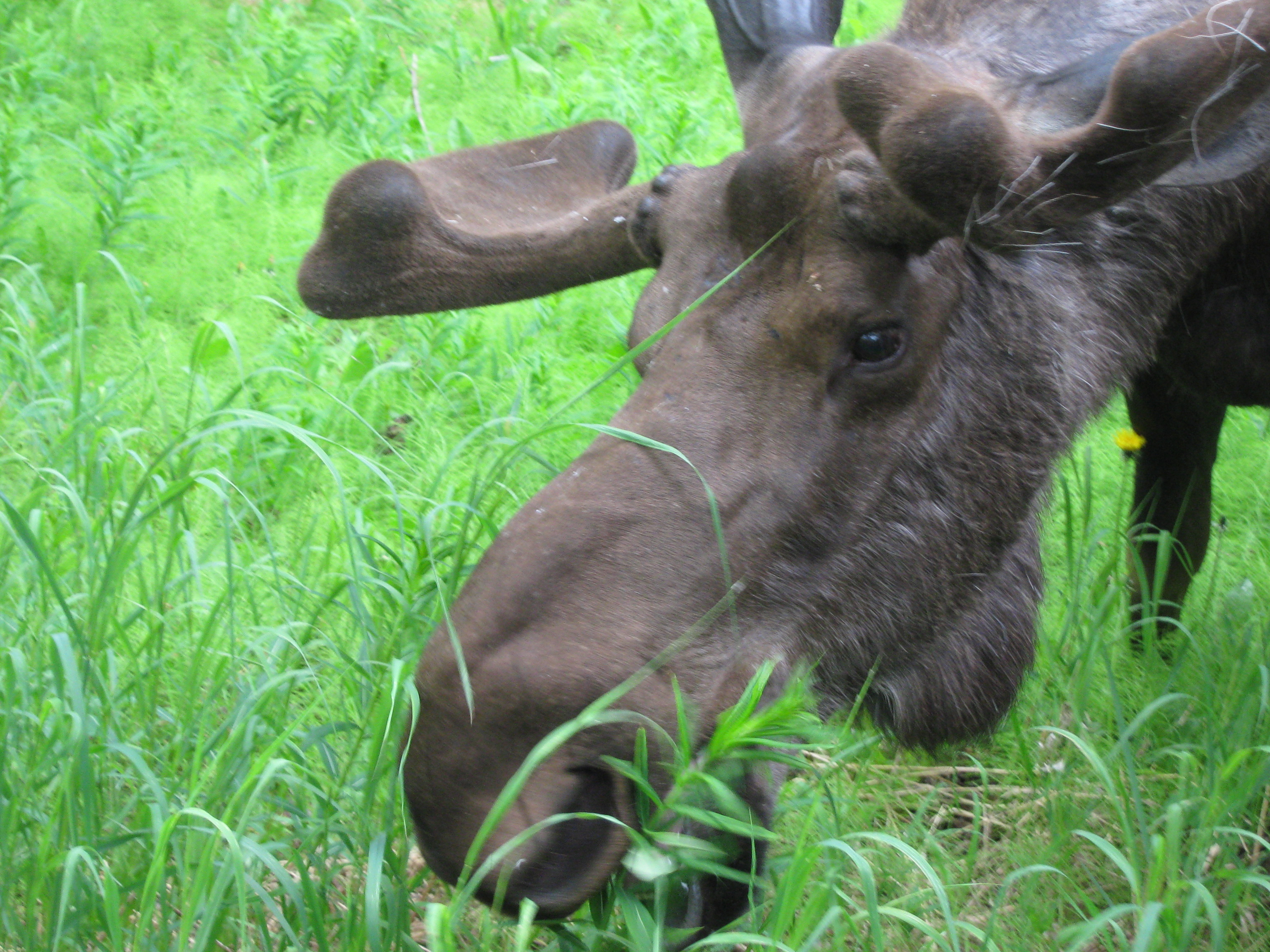
Bull moose eating a fireweed plant

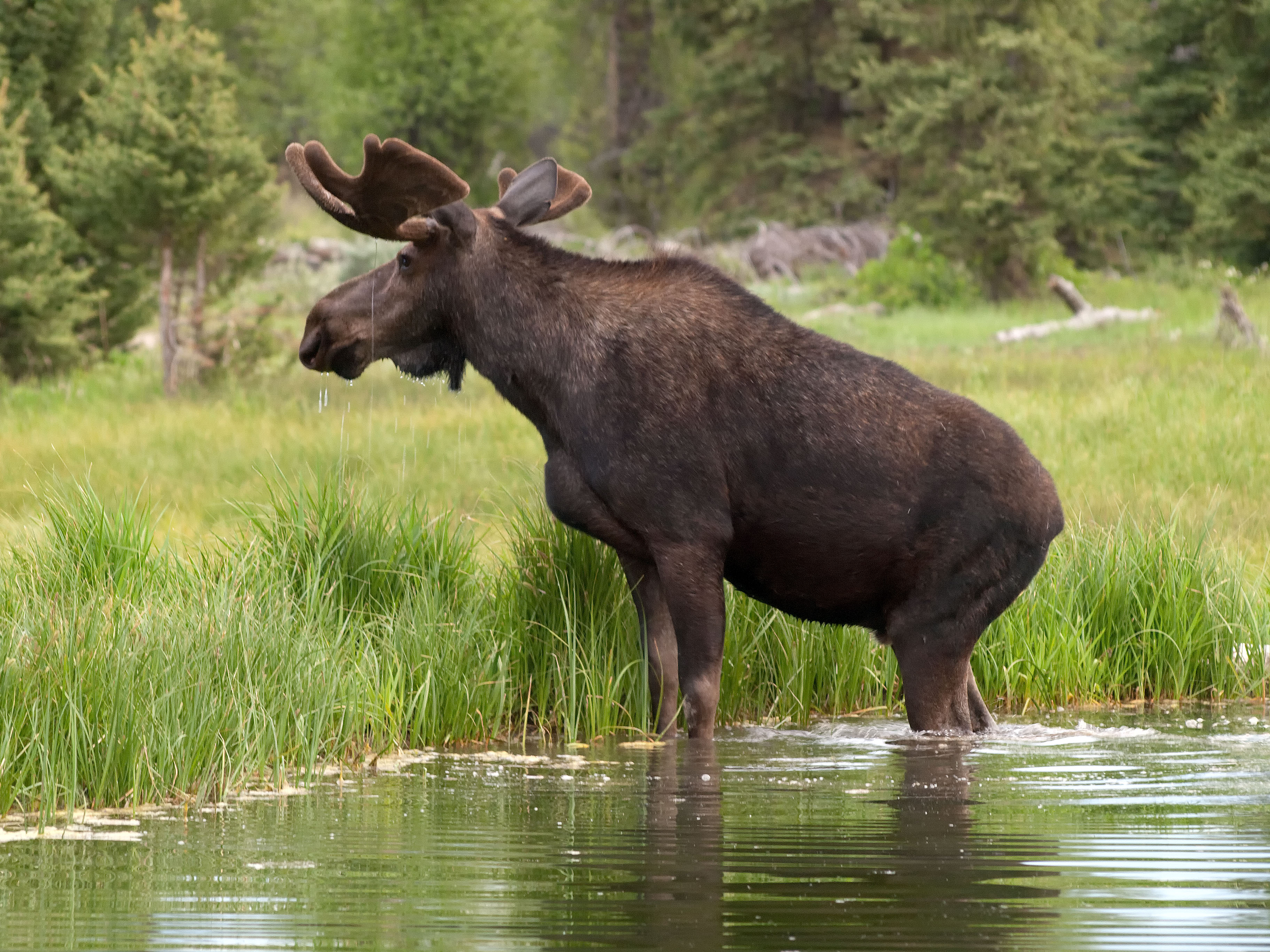
Bull moose browses a beaver pond

=== Natural predators ===
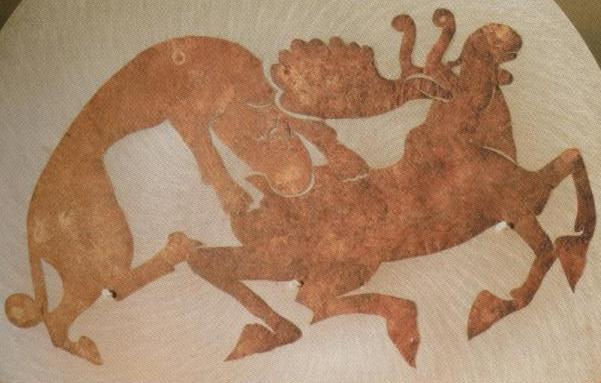
Iron Age saddle from Siberia, depicting a moose being hunted by a Siberian tiger

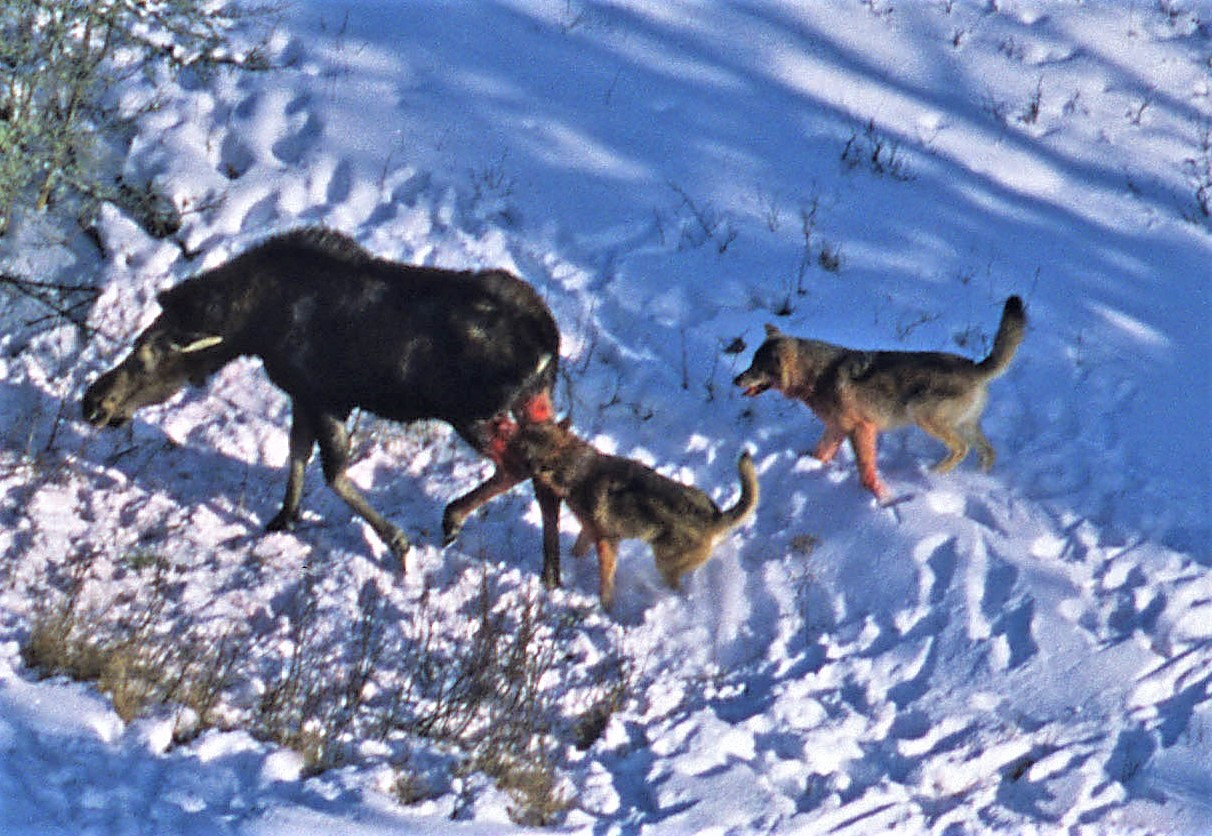
Moose attacked by wolves

A full-grown moose has few enemies except Siberian tigers (Panthera tigris tigris), which regularly prey on adult moose; however, a pack of gray wolves (Canis lupus) can still pose a threat, especially to females with calves. Brown bears (Ursus arctos) are also known to prey on moose of various sizes; they are the only predator besides the wolf to attack moose both in Eurasia and North America. In Western Russia, moose provide about 15% annual estimated dietary energy content for brown bears and are the most important food source for these predators during spring. However, Brown bears are more likely to scavenge a wolf kill or to take young moose than to hunt adult moose on their own. Black bears (Ursus americanus) and cougars (Puma concolor) can be significant predators of moose calves in May and June and can, in rare instances, prey on adults (mainly cows rather than the larger bulls). Wolverines (Gulo gulo) are most likely to eat moose as carrion but have killed moose, including adults, when the large ungulates are weakened by harsh winter conditions. Orcas (Orcinus orca) are the moose's only confirmed marine predator as they have been known to prey on moose and other deer swimming between islands out of North America's Northwest Coast. However, such kills are rare and a matter of opportunity, as moose are not a regular part of the orca diet. There is at least one recorded instance of a moose being scavenged by a Greenland shark (Somniosus microcephalus).

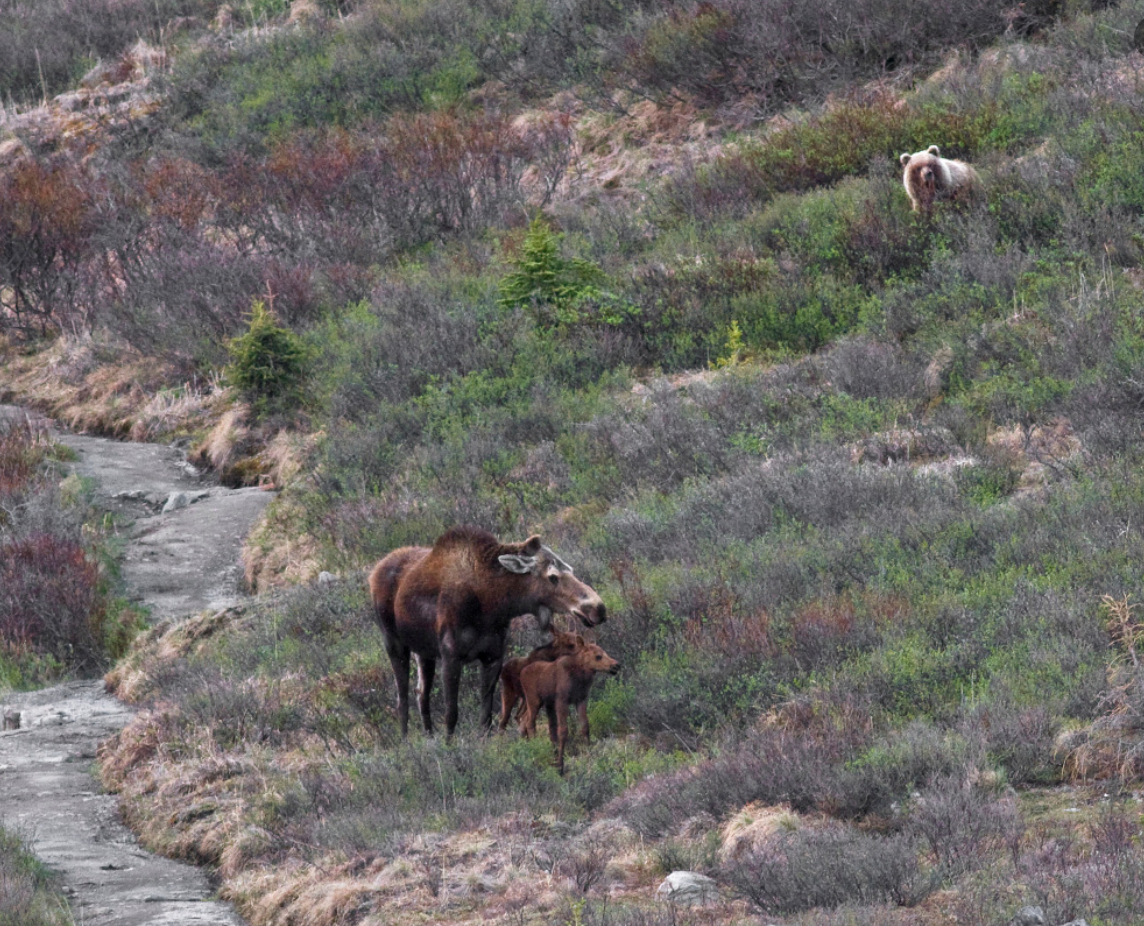
Moose with calves being approached by a brown bear, Denali National Park, Alaska

In some areas, moose are the primary source of food for wolves. Moose usually flee upon detecting wolves. Wolves usually follow moose at a distance of 100 to 400 meters (300 to 1,300 ft), occasionally at a distance of two to three kilometers (1 to 2 mi). Attacks from wolves against young moose may last seconds, though sometimes they can be drawn out for days with adults. Sometimes, wolves will chase moose into shallow streams or onto frozen rivers, where their mobility is greatly impeded. Moose will sometimes stand their ground and defend themselves by charging at the wolves or lashing out at them with their powerful hooves. Wolves typically kill moose by tearing at their haunches and perineum, causing massive blood loss. Occasionally, a wolf may immobilize a moose by biting its sensitive nose, the pain of which can paralyze a moose. Wolf packs primarily target calves and elderly animals, but can and will take healthy, adult moose. Moose between the ages of two and eight are seldom killed by wolves. Though moose are usually hunted by packs, there are cases in which single wolves have successfully killed healthy, fully-grown moose.

Research into moose predation suggests that their response to perceived threats is learned rather than instinctual. In practical terms this means moose are more vulnerable in areas where wolf or bear populations were decimated in the past but are now rebounding. These same studies suggest, however, that moose learn quickly and adapt, fleeing an area if they hear or smell wolves, bears, or scavenger birds such as ravens.

Moose are also subject to various diseases and forms of parasitism. In northern Europe, the moose botfly is a parasite whose range seems to be spreading.

=== Parasites ===
Moose typically carry a heavy burden of parasites, both externally and internally. Parasitosis is an important cause of moose morbidity and mortality and also contributes to vulnerability to predators. Ectoparasites of moose include the moose nose bot fly (Cephenemyia ulrichii), and winter ticks (Dermacentor albipictus). Endoparasites of moose include dog tapeworm, meningeal worm, lungworm, and roundworm.

=== Social structure and reproduction ===
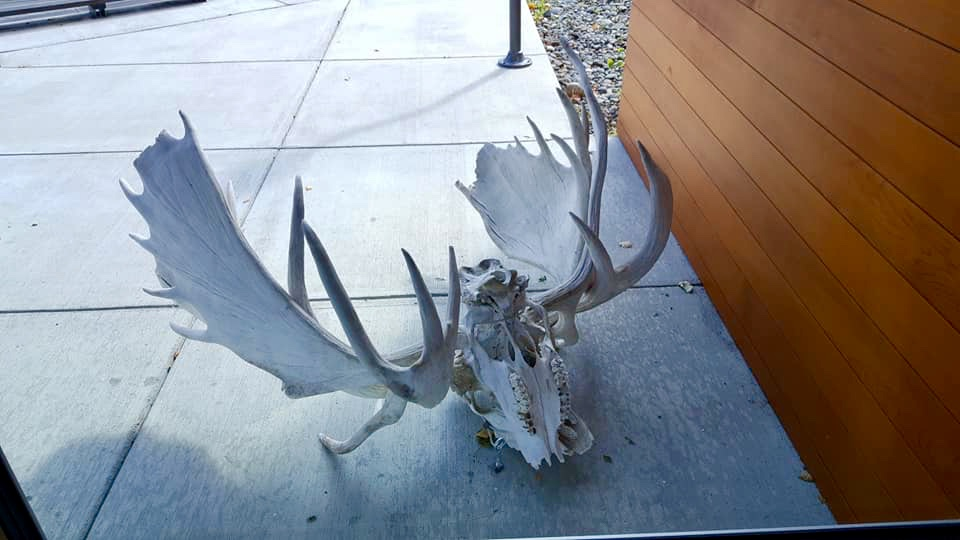
Display at the Kenai National Wildlife Refuge of the skulls of two bulls who apparently died after their antlers became locked during a fight

Moose are mostly diurnal. They are generally solitary with the strongest bonds between mother and calf. Although moose rarely gather in groups, there may be several in close proximity during the mating season.

Rutting and mating occurs in September and October. During the rut, mature bulls will cease feeding completely for a period of approximately two weeks; this fasting behavior has been attributed to neurophysiological changes related to redeployment of olfaction for detection of moose urine and moose cows. The males are polygynous and will seek several females to breed with. During this time both sexes will call to each other. Males produce heavy grunting sounds that can be heard from up to 500 metres (1,600 ft) away, while females produce wail-like sounds. Males will fight for access to females. Initially, the males assess which of them is dominant and one bull may retreat, however, the interaction can escalate to a fight using their antlers.

Female moose have an eight-month gestation period, usually bearing one calf, or twins if food is plentiful, in May or June. Twinning can run as high as 30% to 40% with good nutrition Newborn moose have fur with a reddish hue in contrast to the brown appearance of an adult. The young will stay with the mother until just before the next young are born. The lifespan of an average moose is about 15–25 years. Moose populations are stable at 25 calves for every 100 cows at 1 year of age. With availability of adequate nutrition, mild weather, and low predation, moose have a huge potential for population expansion.

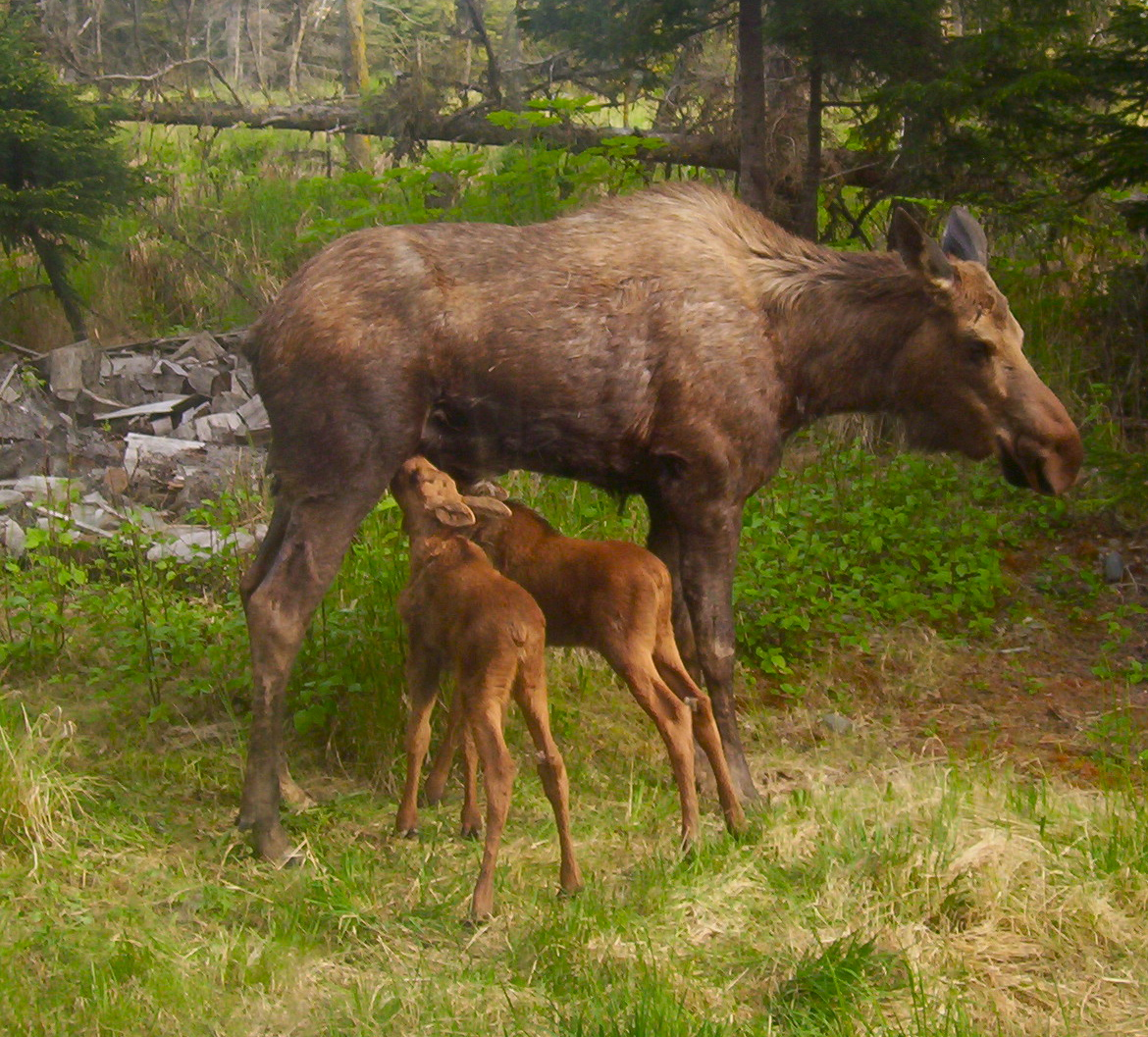
(Newborn)
Calves nursing in spring

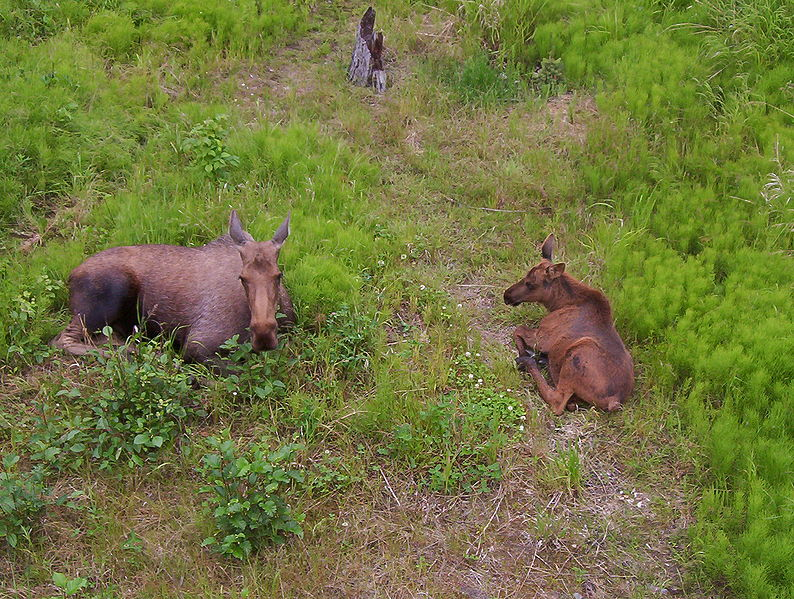
(3 months)
Calves stay near their mothers at all times.

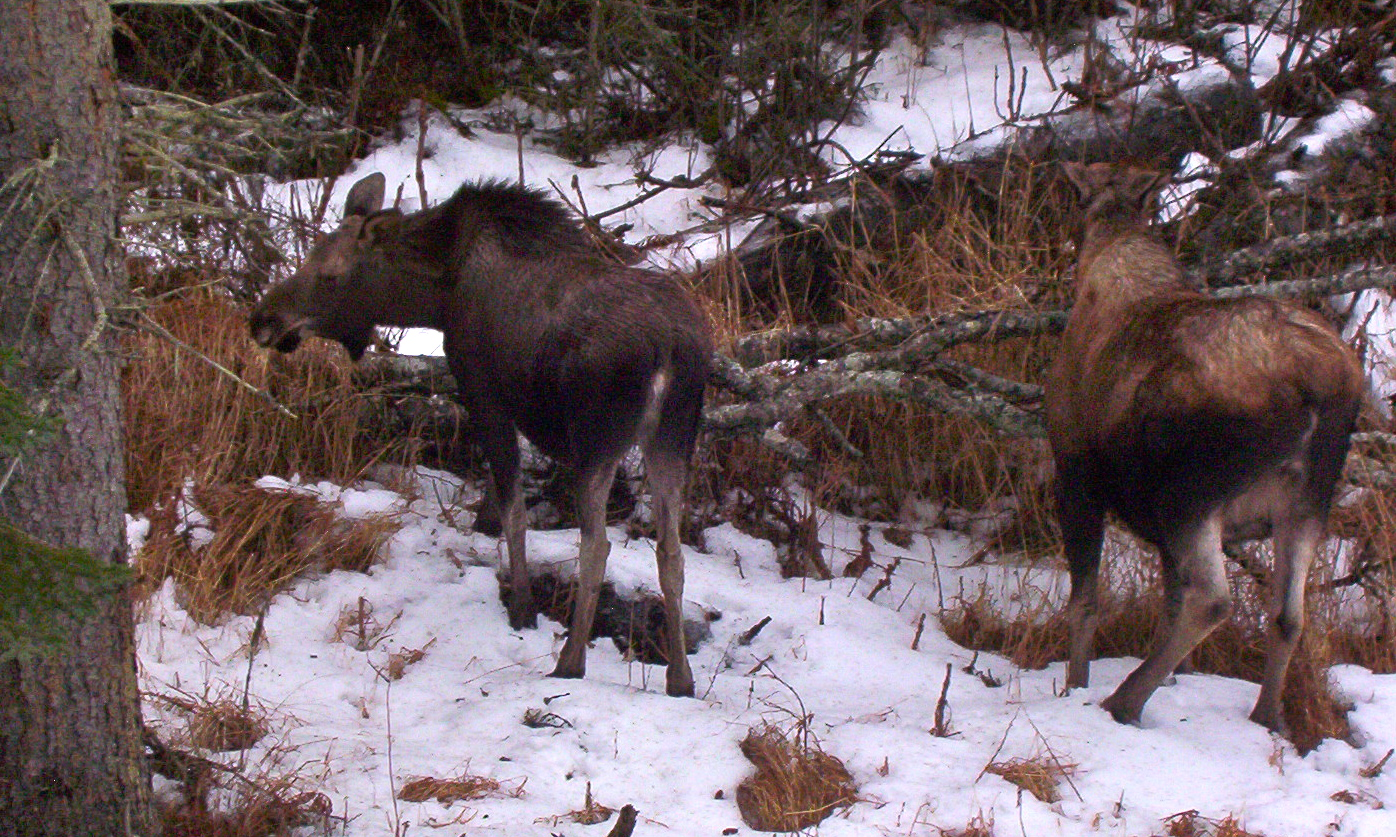
(9 months)
This calf is almost ready to leave its mother.

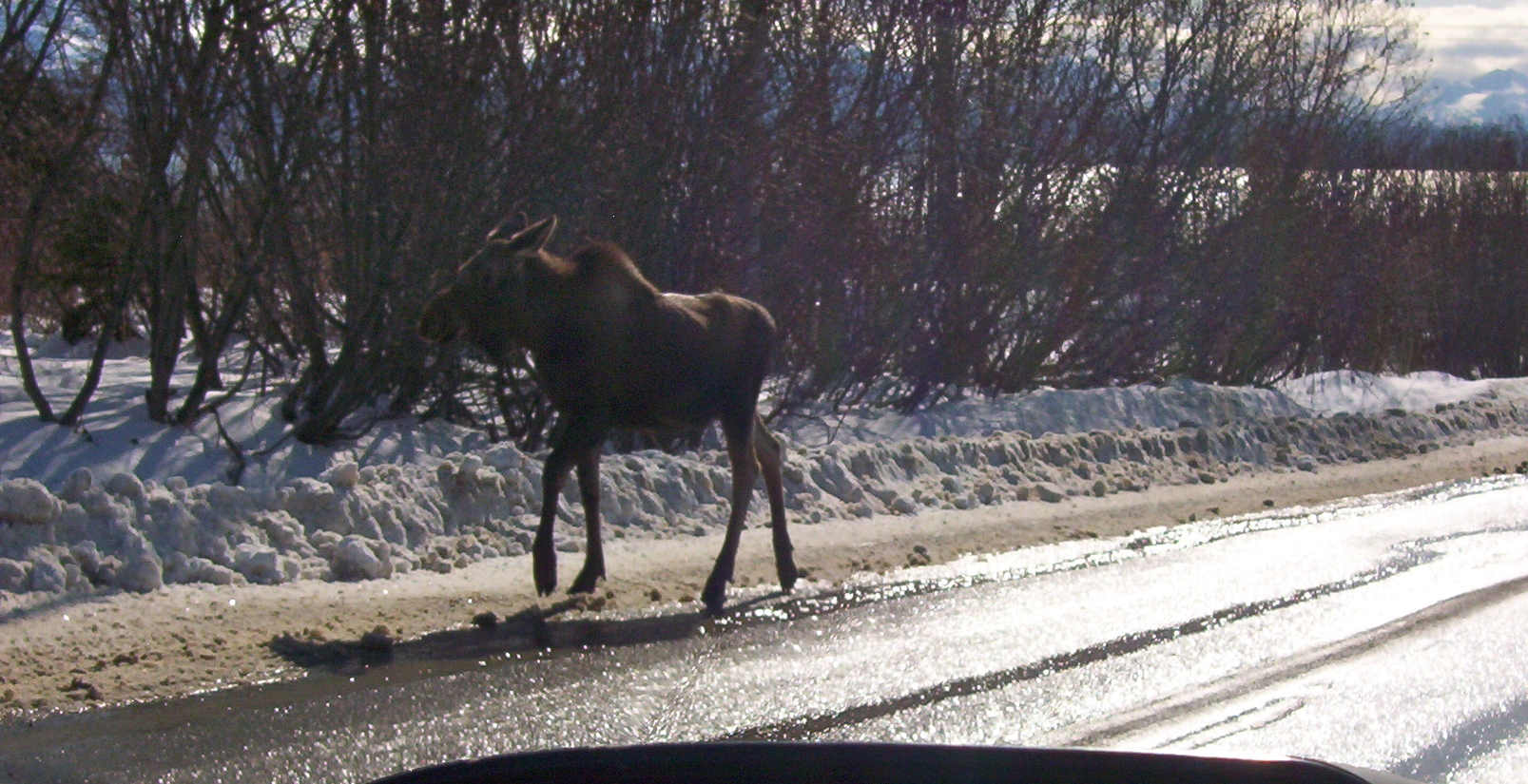
(10–11 months)
This yearling was probably recently chased away by its pregnant mother.

=== Aggression ===
Moose are not typically aggressive towards humans, but will be aggressive when provoked or frightened. Moose attack more people than bears and wolves combined, but usually with only minor consequences. Moose injure more people than any other wild mammal; worldwide, only hippopotamuses injure more. When harassed or startled by people or in the presence of a dog, moose may charge. Also, as with bears or most wild animals, moose accustomed to being fed by people may act aggressively when denied food. During the fall mating season, bulls may be aggressive toward humans. Cows are protective of young calves and will attack humans who come close, especially if they come between mother and calf. Moose are not territorial, do not view humans as food, and usually will not pursue humans who run away.

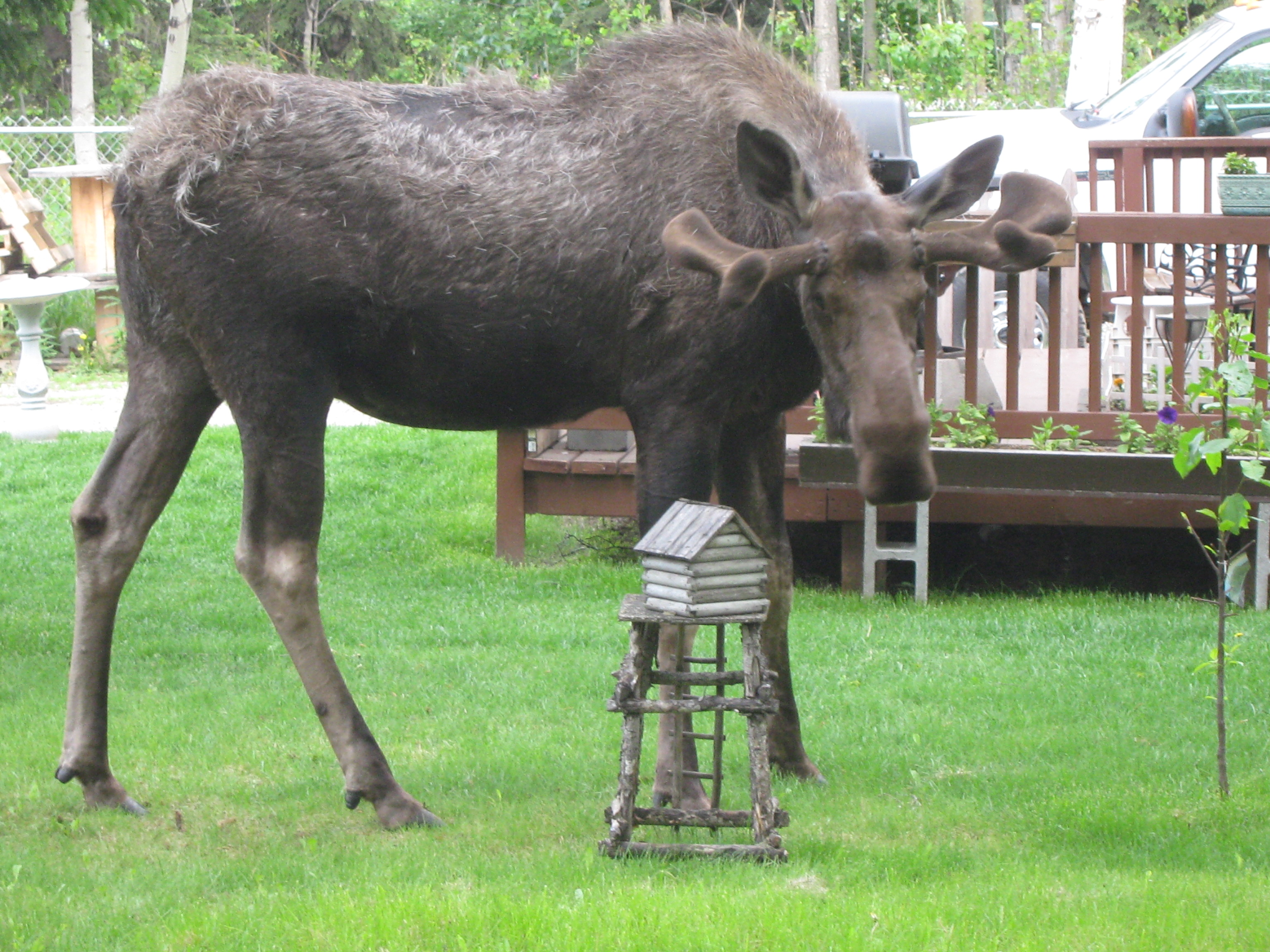
A bull, disturbed by the photographer, lowers his head and raises his hackles.

Moose are unpredictable. They are most likely to attack if annoyed or harassed, or if approached too closely. A moose that has been harassed may vent its anger on anyone in the vicinity, and they often do not make distinctions between their tormentors and innocent passersby. Moose are very limber animals with highly flexible joints and sharp, pointed hooves, and are capable of kicking with both front and back legs. Moose can kick in all directions, including sideways. Thus, there is no safe side from which to approach. Moose often give warning signs prior to attacking, displaying aggression by means of body language. Maintained eye contact is usually the first sign of aggression, while laid-back ears or a lowered head is a sign of agitation. When the hairs on the back of the moose's neck and shoulders (hackles) stand up, a charge is usually imminent. The Anchorage Visitor Centers warn tourists that "...a moose with its hackles raised is a thing to fear."

Moose cows are more likely to emit protest moans when courted by small males. This attracts the attention of large males, promotes male-male competition and violence, reduces harassment of cows by small males, and increases mating opportunities with large males. This in turn means that the cow moose has at least a small degree of control over which bulls she mates with.

Moose often show aggression to other animals as well, especially predators. Bears are common predators of moose calves and, rarely, adults. Alaskan moose have been reported to successfully fend off attacks from both black and brown bears. Moose have been known to stomp attacking wolves, which makes them less preferred as prey to the wolves. Moose are fully capable of killing bears and wolves. In one rare event, a female moose killed two adult male wolves. A moose of either sex that is confronted by danger may let out a loud roar, more resembling that of a predator than a prey animal. European moose are often more aggressive than North American moose, such as the moose in Sweden, which often become very agitated at the sight of a predator. However, like all ungulates known to attack predators, the more aggressive individuals are always darker in color, with the darkest coloring usually in areas facing the opponent, thus serving as a natural warning to other animals.

== Habitat, range, and distribution ==
=== Habitat ===
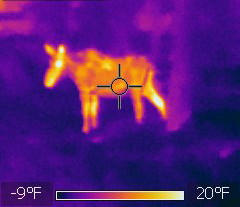
Thermal image of a cow moose in the winter. Her thick, coarse fur with hollow hairs only measures an average of 8.3 °C (15 °F) above the ambient temperature of −23 °C (−9 °F), showing low heat-loss.

Moose require habitat with adequate edible plants (e.g., pond grasses, young trees and shrubs), cover from predators, and protection from extremely hot or cold weather. Moose travel among different habitats with the seasons to address these requirements. Moose are cold-adapted mammals with thickened skin, dense, heat-retaining coat, and a low surface-to-volume ratio, which provides excellent cold tolerance but poor heat tolerance. Moose survive hot weather by accessing shade or cooling wind, or by immersion in cool water. In hot weather, moose are often found wading or swimming in lakes or ponds. When heat-stressed, moose may fail to adequately forage in summer and may not gain adequate body fat to survive the winter. Also, moose cows may not calve without adequate summer weight gain. Moose require access to both young forest for browsing and mature forest for shelter and cover. Forest disturbed by fire and logging promotes the growth of fodder for moose. Moose also require access to mineral licks, safe places for calving and aquatic feeding sites.

Moose avoid areas with little or no snow as this increases the risk of predation by wolves and avoid areas with deep snow, as this impairs mobility. Thus, moose select habitat on the basis of trade-offs between risk of predation, food availability, and snow depth. With reintroduction of bison into boreal forest, there was some concern that bison would compete with moose for winter habitat, and thereby worsen the population decline of moose. However, this does not appear to be a problem. Moose prefer sub-alpine shrublands in early winter, while bison prefer wet sedge valley meadowlands in early winter. In late winter, moose prefer river valleys with deciduous forest cover or alpine terrain above the tree line, while bison preferred wet sedge meadowlands or sunny southern grassy slopes.

=== North America ===
After expanding for most of the 20th century, the moose population of North America has been in steep decline since the 1990s. Populations expanded greatly with improved habitat and protection, but now the moose population is declining rapidly. This decline has been attributed to opening of roads and landscapes into the northern range of moose, and allowing deer to become populous in areas where they were not previously common. This encroachment by deer on moose habitat brought moose into contact with previously unfamiliar pathogens, including brainworm and liver fluke, and these parasites are believed to have contributed to the population decline of moose.

In North America, the moose range includes almost all of Canada (excluding the arctic and Vancouver Island), most of Alaska, northern and eastern North Dakota, northern New England, the Adirondack Mountain region and Taconic highlands of northeast New York State, the upper Rocky Mountains, northern Minnesota, northern Wisconsin, Michigan's Upper Peninsula, and Isle Royale in Lake Superior. In the West, moose populations extend across Canada (British Columbia and Alberta). Isolated groups have been verified as far south as the mountains of Utah and Colorado and as far west as the Lake Wenatchee area of the Washington Cascades. In the northwestern US, the range includes Wyoming, Montana, Idaho, and smaller areas of Washington, and Oregon. Moose have extended their range southwards in the western Rocky Mountains, with initial sightings in Yellowstone National Park in 1868, and then to the northern slope of the Uinta Mountains in Utah in the first half of the twentieth century. This is the southernmost naturally established moose population in the United States. In 1978, a few breeding pairs were reintroduced in western Colorado, and the state's moose population is now more than 2,400.

In northeastern North America, the Eastern moose's history is very well documented: moose meat was a staple in the diet of indigenous peoples for centuries. The common name "moose" was brought into English from the word used by those who lived in present day coastal Rhode Island. The indigenous people often used moose hides for leather and its meat as an ingredient in pemmican, a type of dried jerky used as a source of sustenance in winter or on long journeys.

The historical range of the subspecies extended from well into Quebec, the Maritimes, and Eastern Ontario south to include all of New England finally ending in the very northeastern tip of Pennsylvania in the west, cutting off somewhere near the mouth of the Hudson River in the south. The moose has been extinct in much of the eastern U.S. for as long as 150 years, due to colonial era overhunting and destruction of its habitat: Dutch, French, and British colonial sources all attest to its presence in the mid 17th century from Maine south to areas within 160 kilometers (100 mi) of present-day Manhattan. However, by the 1870s, only a handful of moose existed in this entire region in very remote pockets of forest; less than 20% of suitable habitat remained.

Since the 1980s, however, moose populations have rebounded, thanks to regrowth of plentiful food sources, abandonment of farmland, better land management, clean-up of pollution, and natural dispersal from the Canadian Maritimes and Quebec. South of the Canada–US border, Maine has most of the population with a 2012 headcount of about 76,000 moose. Dispersals from Maine over the years have resulted in healthy, growing populations each in Vermont and New Hampshire, notably near bodies of water and as high up as 910 m (3,000 ft) above sea level in the mountains. In Massachusetts, moose had gone extinct by 1870, but re-colonized the state in the 1960s, with the population expanding from Vermont and New Hampshire; by 2010, the population was estimated at 850–950. Moose reestablished populations in eastern New York and Connecticut and appeared headed south towards the Catskill Mountains, a former habitat.

In the Midwest U.S., moose are primarily limited to the upper Great Lakes region, but strays, primarily immature males, have been found as far south as eastern Iowa.

Moose were successfully introduced on Newfoundland in 1878 and 1904, where they are now the dominant ungulate. However, they are not native to Newfoundland, and their negative impacts on flora and fauna, including endemic species, is well documented. They have been somewhat less successfully on Anticosti Island in the Gulf of Saint Lawrence.

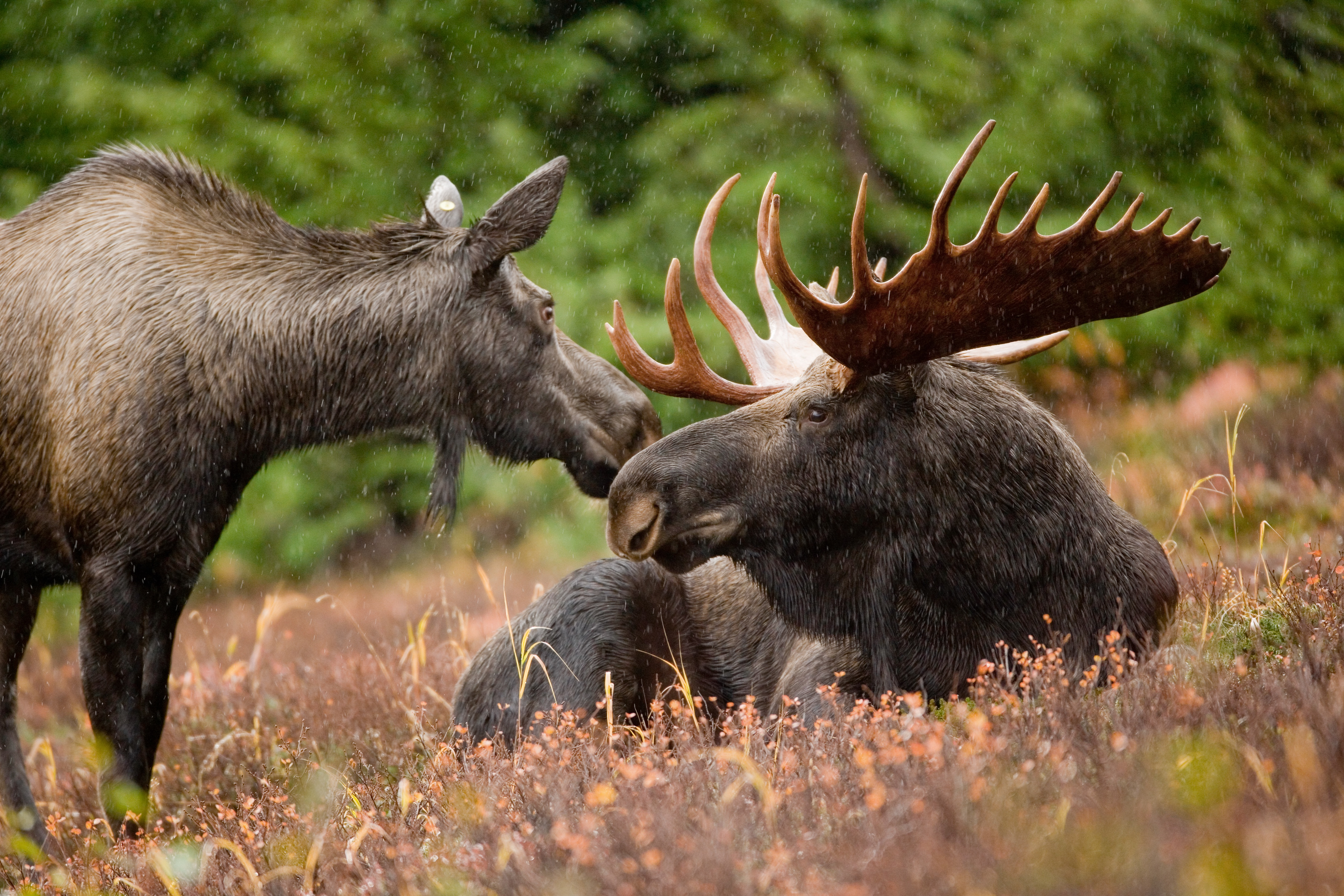
Cow and bull moose

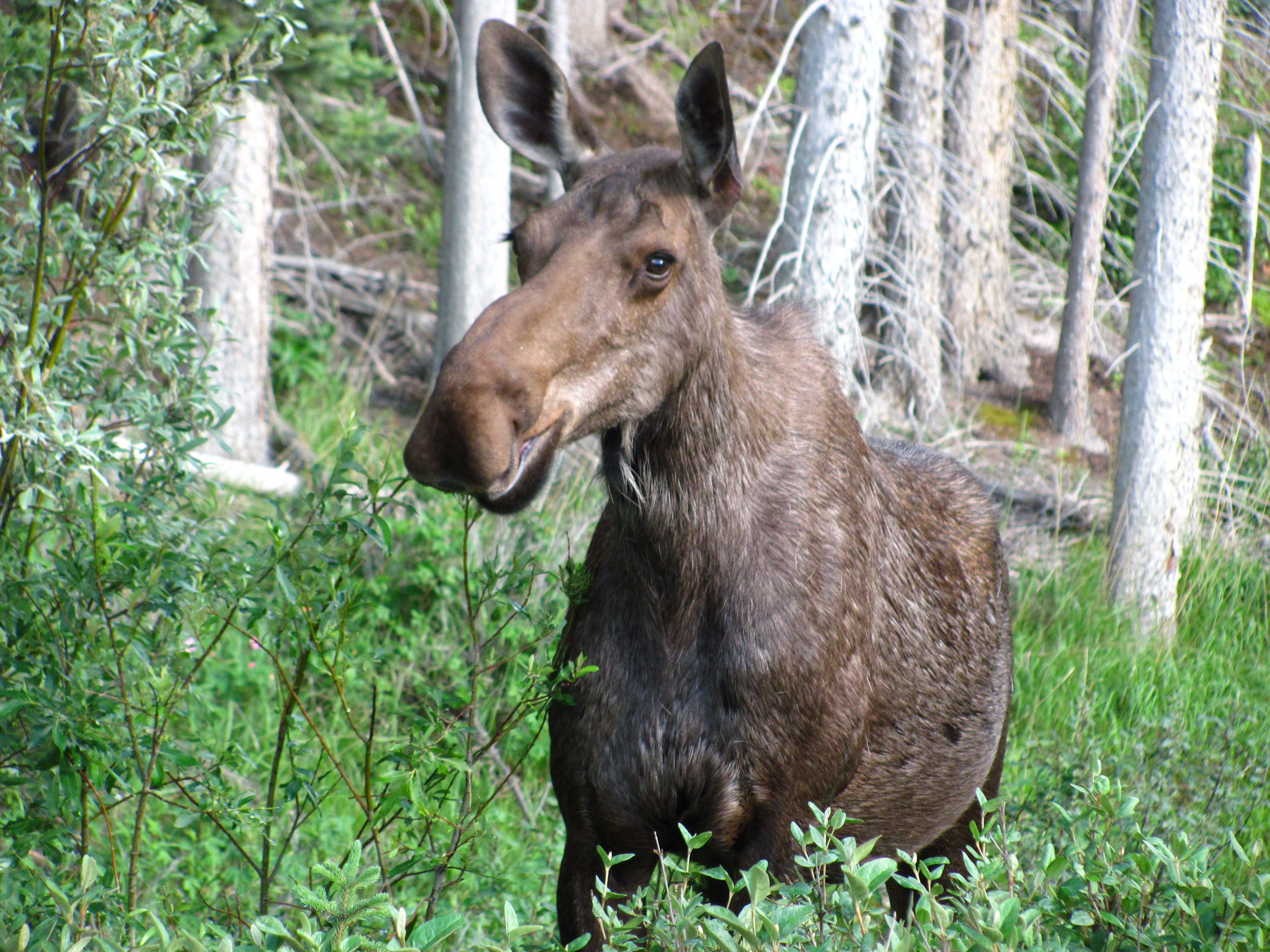
Cow moose

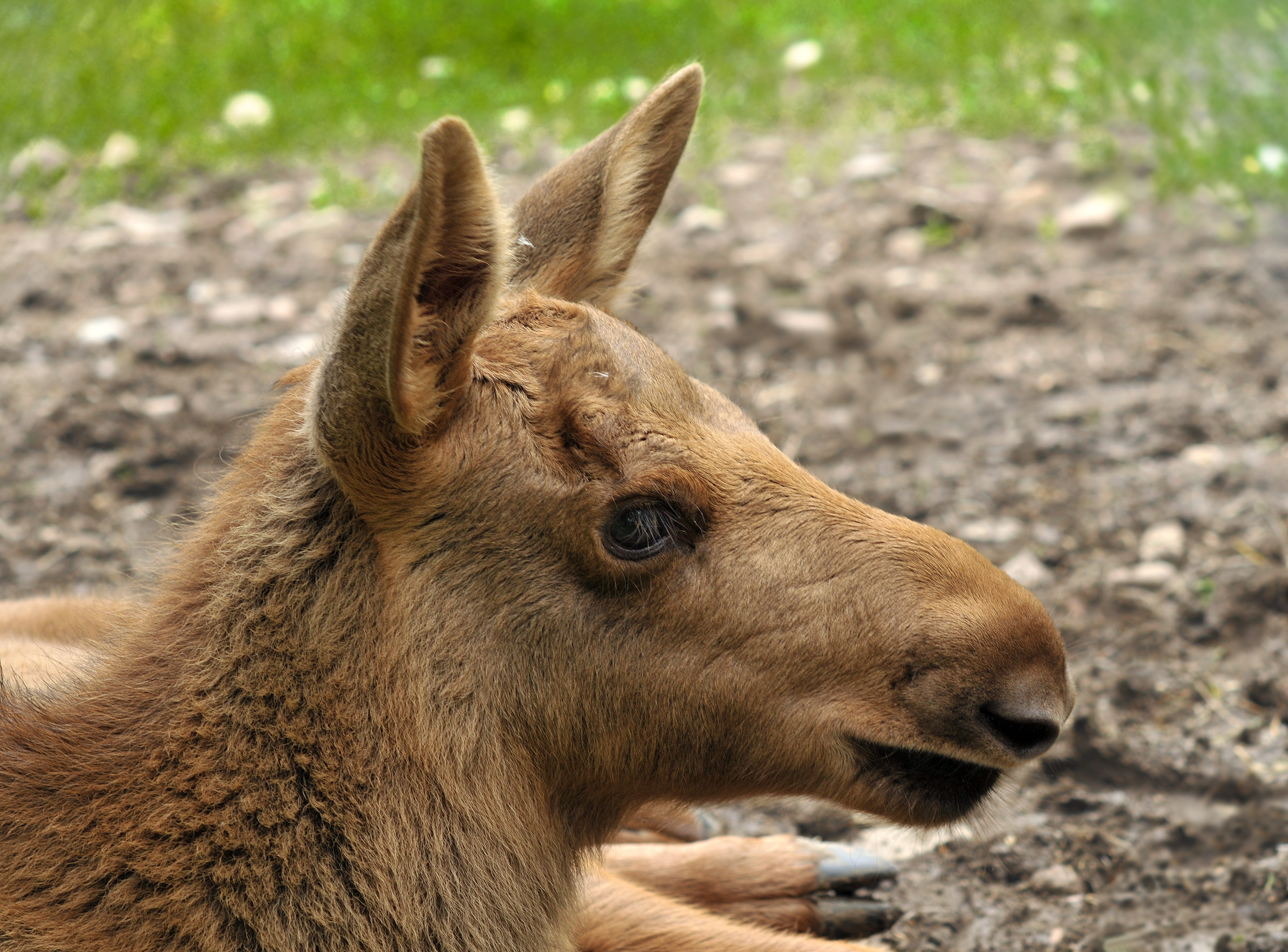
Moose calf

==== Decline in population ====
Since the 1990s, moose populations have declined dramatically in much of temperate North America, although they remain stable in Arctic and subarctic regions. The exact causes of specific die-offs are not determined, but most documented mortality events were due to wolf predation, bacterial infection due to injuries sustained from predators, and parasites from white-tailed deer to which moose have not developed a natural defense, such as liver flukes, brain worms and winter tick infestations. Predation of moose calves by brown bear is also significant. Landscape change from salvage logging of forest damage caused by the mountain pine beetle has resulted in greater foraging in logged areas by female moose, and this is the lead hypothesis as to why the moose population is declining in eastern North American forests, as this likely leads to increased predation. An alternate hypotheses among biologists for generalized, non-hunting declines in moose populations at the southern extent of their range is increasing heat stress brought on by the rapid seasonal temperature upswings as a result of human-induced climate change. Biologists studying moose populations typically use warm-season, heat-stress thresholds of between 14 and 24 °C (57 and 75 °F). However, the minor average temperature increase of 0.83–1.11 °C (1.5–2 °F), over the last 100 years, has resulted in milder winters that induce favorable conditions for ticks, parasites and other invasive species to flourish within the southern range of moose habitat in North America. The moose population in New Hampshire fell from 7,500 in the early 2000s to a 2014 estimate of 4,000 and in Vermont the numbers were down to 2,200 from a high of 5,000 animals in 2005. Much of the decline has been attributed to the winter tick, which, between 2017 and 2019, accounted for 74% of all winter mortality and 91% of winter calf deaths in Vermont. Moose with heavy tick infections will rub their fur down to the skin raw trying to get the ticks off, making them look white when their outer coat rubs off. Locals call them ghost moose. Loss of the insulating winter coat through attempts to rid the moose of winter tick increases the risk of hypothermia in winter.

=== Europe and Asia ===
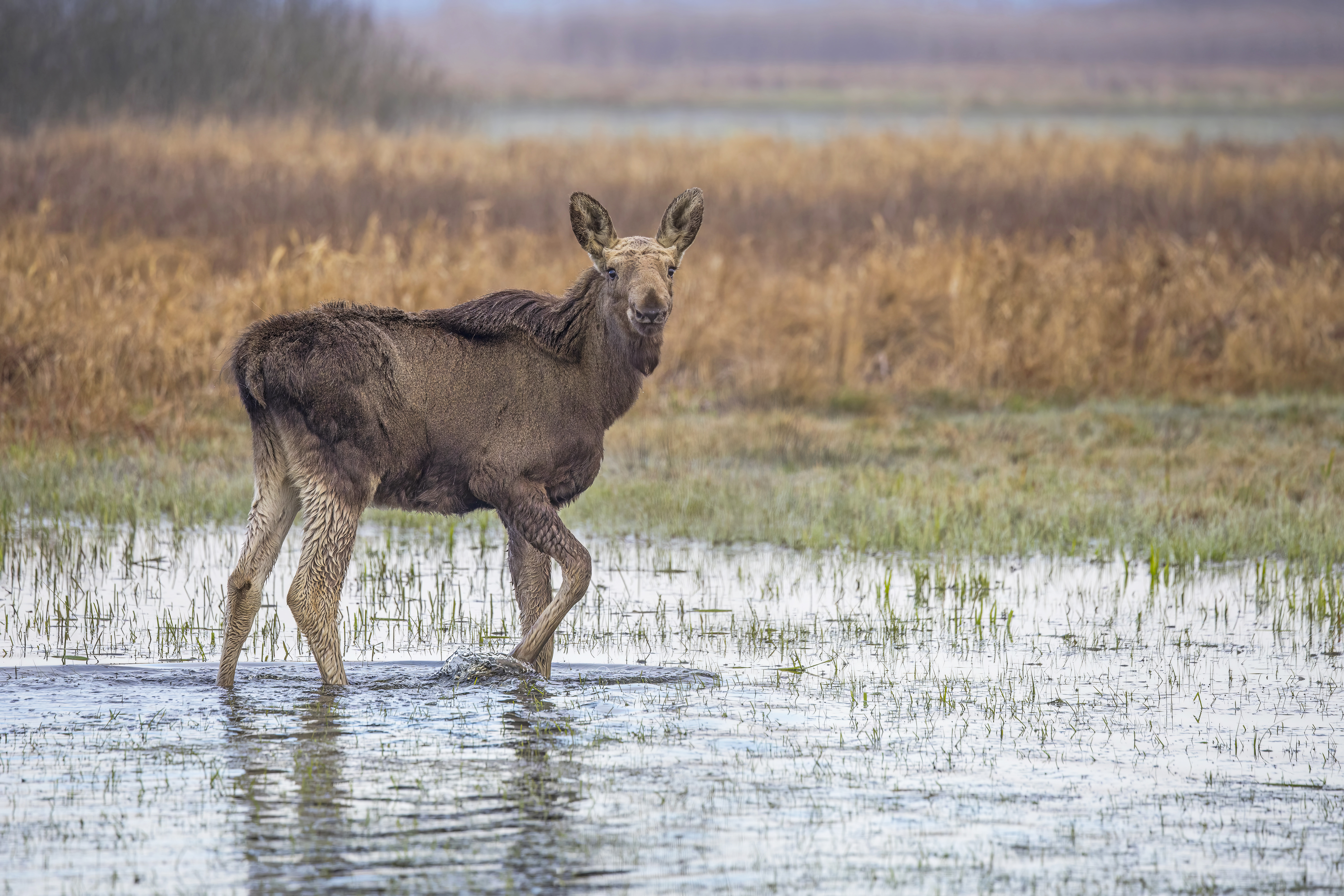
An A. a. alces calf in the Biebrza National Park, Poland

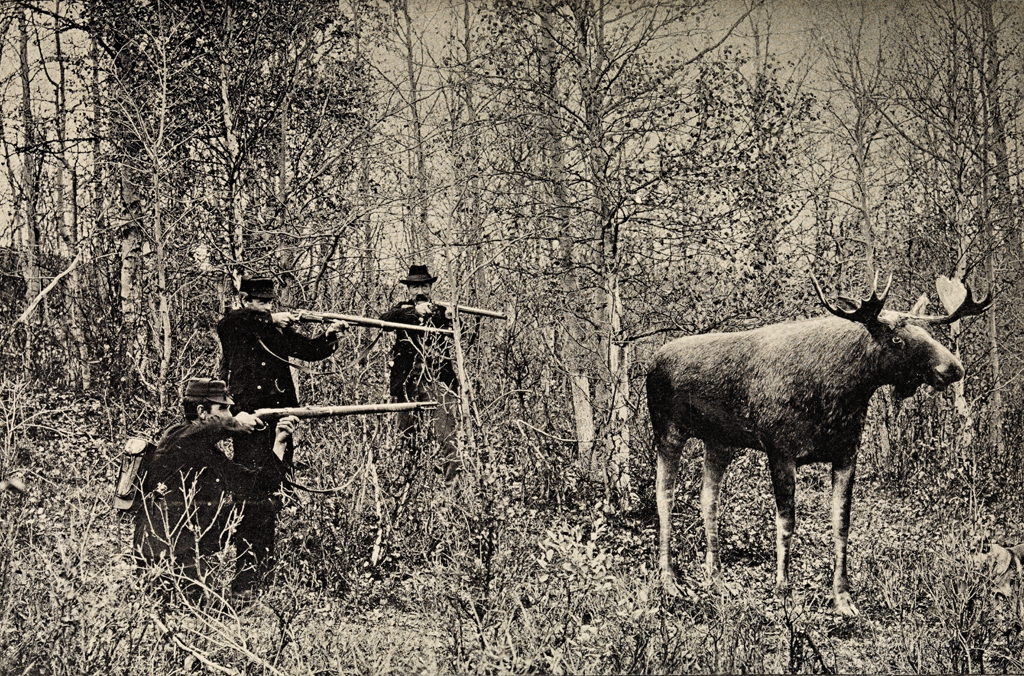
Staged picture of a moose hunt in Norway, date unknown

In Europe, moose are currently found in large numbers throughout Norway, Sweden, Finland, Latvia, Estonia, and Poland, with more modest numbers in the southern Czech Republic, Belarus, and northern Ukraine. They are also widespread throughout Russia, extending from the borders with Finland south toward Estonia, Belarus, and Ukraine, and far eastward to the Yenisei River in Siberia. The European moose was native to most temperate areas with suitable habitat on the continent and even Scotland from the end of the last Ice Age, as Europe had a mix of temperate boreal and deciduous forest. Up through Classical times, the species was certainly thriving in both Gaul and Magna Germania, as it appears in military and hunting accounts of the age. However, as the Roman era faded into medieval times, the beast slowly disappeared: soon after the reign of Charlemagne, the moose disappeared from France, where its range extended from Normandy in the north to the Pyrenees in the south. Farther east, it survived in Alsace and the Netherlands until the 9th century as the marshlands in the latter were drained and the forests were cleared away for feudal lands in the former. It was gone from Switzerland by the year 1000, from the western Czech Republic by 1300, from Mecklenburg in Germany by c. 1600, and from Hungary and the Caucasus since the 18th and 19th century, respectively.

By the early 20th century, the last strongholds of the European moose appeared to be in Fennoscandian areas and patchy tracts of Russia, with a few migrants found in what is now Estonia and Lithuania. The USSR and Poland managed to restore portions of the range within its borders (such as the 1951 reintroduction into Kampinos National Park and the later 1958 reintroduction in Belarus), but political complications limited the ability to reintroduce it to other portions of its range. Attempts in 1930 and again in 1967 in marshland north of Berlin were unsuccessful. At present in Poland, populations are recorded in the Biebrza river valley, Kampinos, and in Białowieża Forest. It has migrated into other parts of Eastern Europe and has been spotted in eastern and southern Germany. Unsuccessful thus far in recolonizing these areas via natural dispersal from source populations in Poland, Belarus, Ukraine, Czech Republic, and Slovakia, it appears to be having more success migrating south into the Caucasus. It is listed under Appendix III of the Bern Convention.

In 2008, two moose were reintroduced into the Scottish Highlands in Alladale Wilderness Reserve. The moose disappeared as a breeding species from Denmark about 4,500 years ago (in the last century, a very small number have lived for periods in Zealand without establishing a population after swimming across the Øresund from Sweden), but in 2016–17 ten were introduced to Lille Vildmose from Sweden. In 2020, this population had increased to about 25 animals.

The East Asian moose populations confine themselves mostly to the territory of Russia, with much smaller populations in Mongolia and Northeastern China. Moose populations are relatively stable in Siberia and increasing on the Kamchatka Peninsula. In Mongolia and China, where poaching took a great toll on moose, forcing them to near extinction, they are protected, but enforcement of the policy is weak and demand for traditional medicines derived from deer parts is high. In 1978, the Regional Hunting Department transported 45 young moose to the center of Kamchatka. These moose were brought from Chukotka, home to the largest moose on the planet. Kamchatka now regularly is responsible for the largest trophy moose shot around the world each season. As it is a fertile environment for moose, with a milder climate, less snow, and an abundance of food, moose quickly bred and settled along the valley of the Kamchatka River and many surrounding regions. The population in the past 20 years has risen to over 2,900 animals.

The size of the moose varies. Following Bergmann's rule, population in the south (A. a. cameloides) usually grow smaller, while moose in the north and northeast (A. a. buturlini) can match the imposing sizes of the Alaskan moose (A. a. gigas) and are prized by trophy hunters.

=== New Zealand ===
In 1900, an attempt to introduce moose into the Hokitika area failed; then in 1910 ten moose (four bulls and six cows) were introduced into Fiordland. This area is considered a less than suitable habitat, and subsequent low numbers of sightings and kills have led to some presumption of this population's failure. The last proven sighting of a moose in New Zealand was in 1952. However, a moose antler was found in 1972, and DNA tests showed that hair collected in 2002 was from a moose. There has been extensive searching, and while automated cameras failed to capture photographs, evidence was seen of bedding spots, browsing, and antler marks.

== Evolutionary history ==
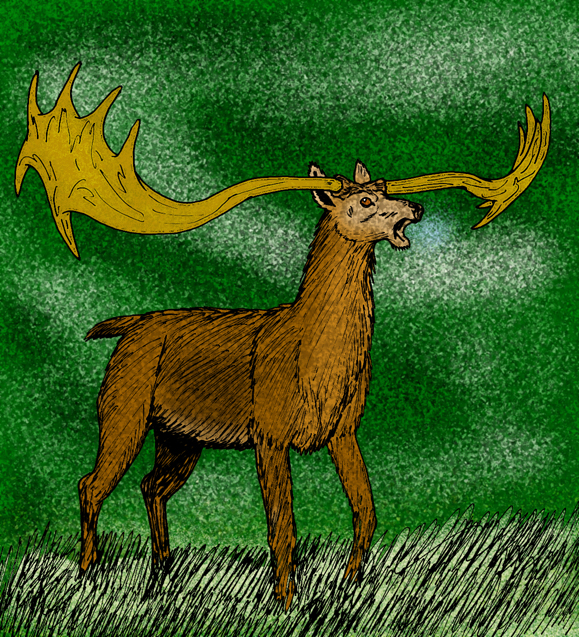
An artist's rendition of Libralces gallicus

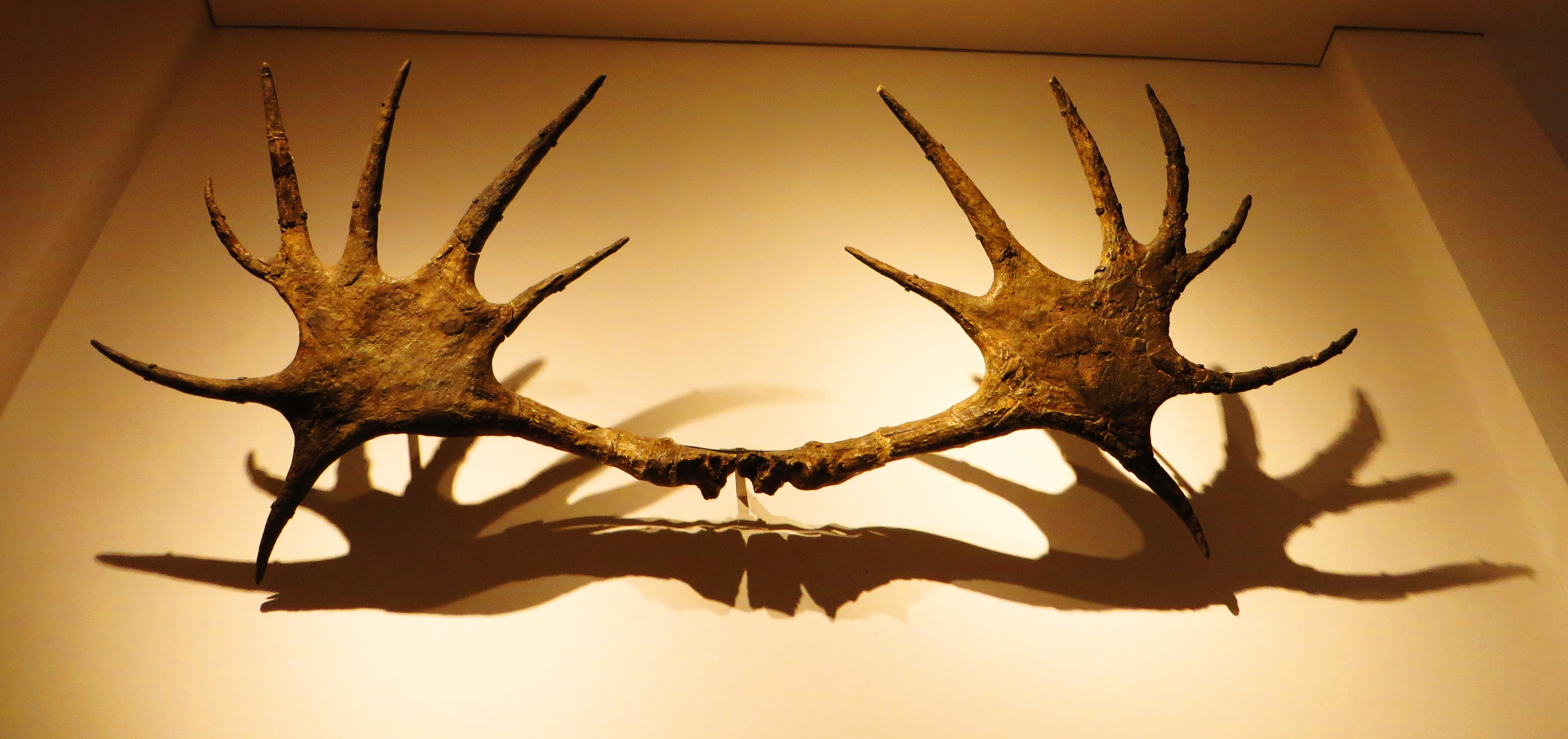
Antlers of Cervalces latifrons

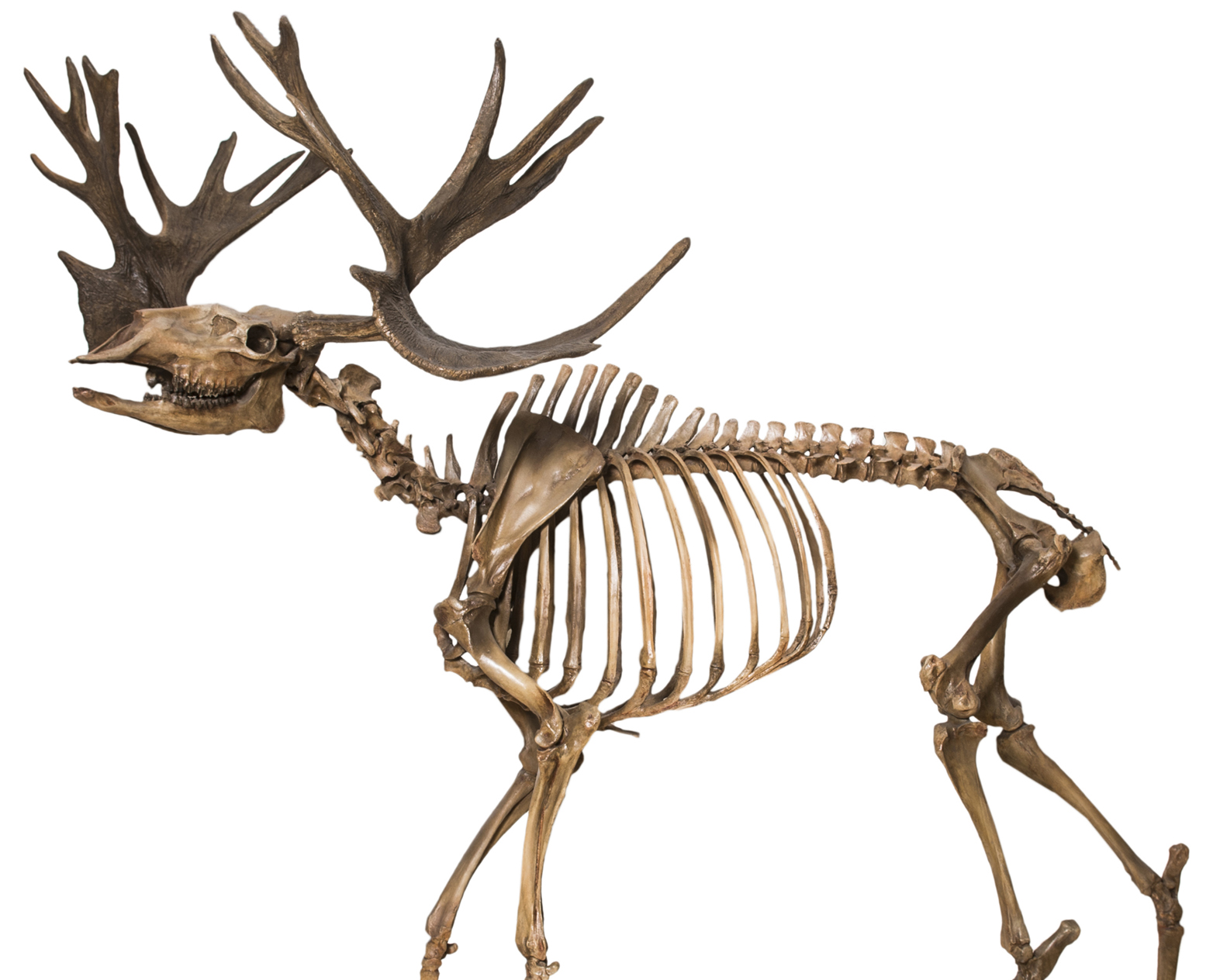
Replica of an American stag-moose skeleton

Moose are members of the subfamily Capreolinae. Members of the moose lineage extend back into the Pliocene-Early Pleistocene. Some scientists group the moose and all its extinct relatives into one genus, Alces, while others, such as Augusto Azzaroli, restrict Alces to the living species, placing the fossil species into the genera Cervalces (stag moose) and Libralces.

The earliest known species in the moose lineage is Libralces gallicus, which lived in the Pliocene-Early Pleistocene. Libralces gallicus came from the warm savannas of Pliocene Europe, with the best-preserved skeletons being found in southern France. L. gallicus was 1.25 times larger than the Alaskan moose in linear dimensions, making it nearly twice as massive. L. gallicus had many striking differences from its modern descendants. It had a longer, narrower snout and a less-developed nasal cavity, more resembling that of a modern deer, lacking any sign of the modern moose-snout. Its face resembled that of the modern wapiti. However, the rest of its skull structure, skeletal structure and teeth bore strong resemblance to those features that are unmistakable in modern moose, indicating a similar diet. Its antlers consisted of a horizontal bar 2.5 m (8 ft 2 in) long, with no tines, ending in small palmations. Its skull and neck structure suggest an animal that fought using high-speed impacts, much like the Dall sheep, rather than locking and twisting antlers the way modern moose combat. Their long legs and bone structure suggest an animal that was adapted to running at high speeds over rough terrain.

Libralces gallicus was followed by Cervalces carnutorum during the first half of the Early Pleistocene. Cervalces carnutorum was soon followed by a much larger species called Cervalces latifrons (broad-fronted stag-moose), which first appeared during the late Early Pleistocene. Many fossils of Cervalces latifrons have been found across Eurasia. Like its descendants, it inhabited mostly northern latitudes, and was probably well-adapted to the cold. C. latifrons was the largest deer known to have ever existed, standing more than 2.1 m (6 ft 11 in) tall at the shoulders. This is bigger than even the Irish elk, which was 1.8 m (5 ft 11 in) tall at the shoulders. Its antlers were smaller than the Irish elk's, but comparable in size to those of L. gallicus. However, the antlers had a shorter horizontal bar and larger palmations, more resembling those of a modern moose. Probably sometime in the Middle Pleistocene, Cervalces latifrons migrated into North America, giving rise to the stag moose (Cervalces scotti). The modern moose is thought to have evolved from Cervalces latifrons at around the end of the Middle Pleistocene to the beginning of the Late Pleistocene, probably somewhere in East Asia, with the earliest fossils of the species in Europe dating to the early Late Pleistocene. The modern moose only arrived in North America around 15,000 years ago, at the end of the Late Pleistocene.

== Populations ==
North America:

- In Canada: There are an estimated 500,000 to 1,000,000 moose, with 150,000 in Newfoundland in 2007 descended from just four that were introduced in the 1900s.
- In United States: There are estimated to be around 300,000:
  - Alaska: The state's Department of Fish and Game estimated 200,000 in 2011.
  - New England: The moose population is estimated at between 60,000–70,000 in Maine (the highest population of any state other than Alaska) 3,000–4,000 in New Hampshire, 2,100 in Vermont, 1,000–1,500 in Massachusetts (in the western and central parts of that state), and 100 in Connecticut
  - New York: In 2024, the New York Department of Environmental Conservation reported a surveyed population of 716 moose within Adirondack Park
  - Rocky Mountain states: Wyoming is said to have the largest share in its six-state region, and its Fish and Game Commission estimated 7,692 in 2009.
  - Upper Midwest: Michigan 2000 on Isle Royale (2019) and an estimated 433 (in its Upper Peninsula) in 2011, Wisconsin, 20–40 (close to its border with Michigan) in 2003, Minnesota 5600 in its northeast in 2010, and under 100 in its northwest in 2009; North Dakota closed, due to low moose population, one of its moose-hunting geographic units in 2011, and issued 162 single-kill licenses to hunters, each restricted to one of the remaining nine units.

Europe and Asia:

- Finland: In 2009, there was a summer population of 115,000.
- Norway: In 2009, there were a winter population of around 120,000. In 2015 31,131 moose were shot. In 1999, a record number of 39,422 moose were shot.
- Latvia: in 2015, there were 21,000.
- Estonia: 11,000 - 7,000
- Lithuania: around 14,000 in 2016
- Poland: 28,000
- Czech Republic: maximum of 50
- Russia: In 2007, there were approximately 600,000.
- Sweden: Summer population is estimated to be 300,000–400,000. Around 100,000 are shot each fall. About 10,000 are killed in traffic accidents yearly.

=== Subspecies ===
European elk	A. a. alces	Finland, Sweden, Norway, Latvia, Estonia and Russia. No longer present in central and western Europe except for Poland, Lithuania and Belarus, with a certain population in the Czech Republic, Slovakia and northern Ukraine, including Bohemia since the 1970s; recently sighted in eastern Germany (the range formerly included France, Switzerland and the Benelux nations). Population increasing and regaining territory. Males weigh about 320 to 475 kg (705 to 1,047 lb) and females weigh 275 to 375 kg (606 to 827 lb) in this mid-sized subspecies. Shoulder height ranges from 1.7 to 2.1 m (5 ft 7 in to 6 ft 11 in).
Yakutia, Mid-Siberian or Lena moose	A. a. pfizenmayeri	Eastern Siberia, Mongolia and Manchuria. Mostly found in the forests of eastern Russia. The most common moose subspecies in Asia. Its range goes from the Yenisei River in the west and most of Siberia. Its range excludes the ranges of the Chukotka and Ussuri moose to the east and northern Mongolia. Similar in size to the western moose of Canada and the United States.
Ussuri or Amur moose	A. a. cameloides	Ranges from the Amur-Ussuri region of far eastern Russia, as well as the northeastern part of China. Ussuri moose are different from other moose subspecies in that their antler size is much smaller, or they lack antlers entirely. Even adult bulls' antlers are small and cervine, with little palmation. The smallest subspecies in both Eurasia and the world, with both males and females standing only 1.65 to 1.85 m (5 ft 5 in to 6 ft 1 in) at the shoulder and weighing between 200 and 350 kg (441 and 772 lb).
Chukotka moose	A. a. buturlini	Ranges from northeastern Siberia from the Alazeya River basin east to the Kolyma and Anadyr basins and south through the Koryak range and the Kamchatka Peninsula. The largest subspecies in Eurasia. Males can grow up to 2.15 m (7 ft 1 in) tall and weigh between 500 and 725 kg (1,102 and 1,598 lb); females are somewhat smaller.
Eastern moose	A. a. americana	Eastern Canada, including eastern Ontario, all of Quebec and the Atlantic Provinces and the northeastern United States, including Maine, New Hampshire, Vermont, Massachusetts, Rhode Island, Connecticut and northern New York near the Adirondack Mountains. Population increasing. This is a fairly small-bodied subspecies, females weighing an average of 270 kg (595 lb), males weighing an average of 365 kg (805 lb) and males standing up to approximately 2 m (6.6 ft) at the shoulder.
Western moose	A. a. andersoni	British Columbia to western Ontario, the eastern Yukon, the Northwest Territories, southwestern Nunavut, Michigan (the Upper Peninsula), northern Wisconsin, northern Minnesota and northeastern North Dakota. A middle-sized subspecies that weighs 340 to 420 kg (750 to 926 lb) in adult females and 450 to 500 kg (992 to 1,102 lb) in adult males on average.
Alaskan moose	A. a. gigas	Alaska and the western Yukon. The largest subspecies in North America and the world and the largest living deer in the world; the largest one shot on record weighed 820 kg (1,808 lb), and was 2.33 m (7.6 ft) tall at the shoulder.
Shiras moose or Yellowstone moose	A. a. shirasi	Colorado, Idaho, Montana, Oregon, Utah, Washington and Wyoming. The smallest subspecies in North America, weighing about 230 to 344 kg (507 to 758 lb) at maturity.
† Caucasian elk	A. a. caucasicus	The Caucasus Mountains. Extinct due to habitat loss and overhunting. Its range would have included European Russia, Armenia, Georgia, Azerbaijan, Turkey and North and West Iran.

== Relationship with humans ==
=== History ===
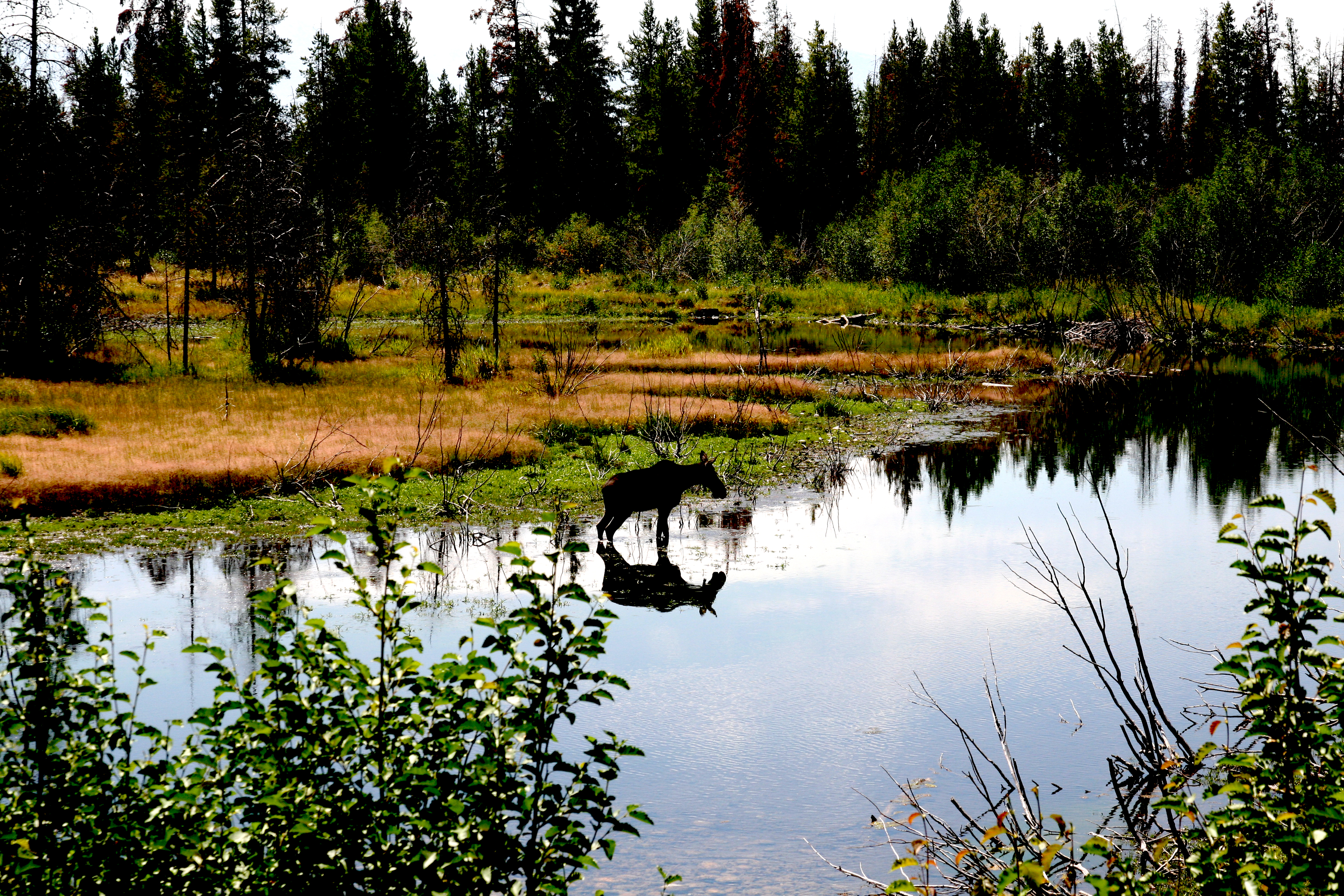
A moose and its reflection

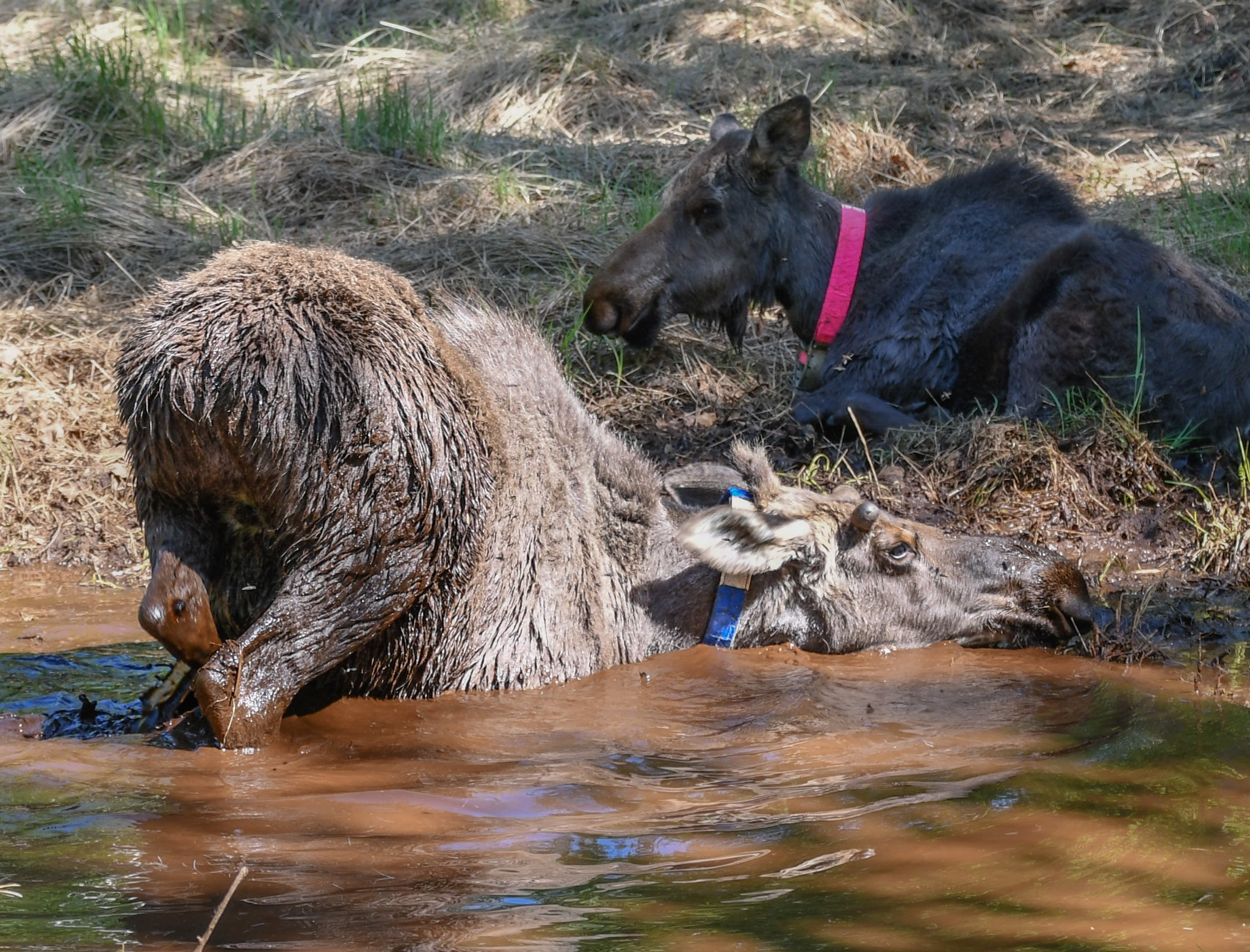
Two young moose wearing radio tracking collars

European rock drawings and cave paintings reveal that moose have been hunted since the Stone Age. Excavations in Alby, Sweden, adjacent to the Stora Alvaret have yielded moose antlers in wooden hut remains from 6000 BC, indicating some of the earliest moose hunting in northern Europe. In northern Scandinavia one can still find remains of trapping pits used for hunting moose. These pits, which can be up to 4 m × 7 m (13 ft × 23 ft) in area and 2 m (6 ft 7 in) deep, would have been camouflaged with branches and leaves. They would have had steep sides lined with planks, making it impossible for the moose to escape once it fell in. The pits are normally found in large groups, crossing the moose's regular paths and stretching over several kilometers. Remains of wooden fences designed to guide the animals toward the pits have been found in bogs and peat. In Norway, an early example of these trapping devices has been dated to around 3700 BC. Trapping elk in pits is an extremely effective hunting method. As early as the 16th century the Norwegian government tried to restrict their use, but the method was in use until the 19th century.

The earliest recorded description of the moose is in Julius Caesar's Commentarii de Bello Gallico, where it is described thus:

There are also [animals], which are called alces (moose). The shape of these, and the varied color of their skins, is much like roes, but in size they surpass them a little and are destitute of horns, and have legs without joints and ligatures; nor do they lie down for the purpose of rest, nor, if they have been thrown down by any accident, can they raise or lift themselves up. Trees serve as beds to them; they lean themselves against them, and thus reclining only slightly, they take their rest; when the huntsmen have discovered from the footsteps of these animals whither they are accustomed to betake themselves, they either undermine all the trees at the roots, or cut into them so far that the upper part of the trees may appear to be left standing. When they have leant upon them, according to their habit, they knock down by their weight the unsupported trees, and fall down themselves along with them.

In book 8, chapter 16 of Pliny the Elder's Natural History from AD 77, the elk and an animal called achlis, which is presumably the same animal, are described thus:

... there is, also, the elk, which strongly resembles our steers, except that it is distinguished by the length of the ears and of the neck. There is also the achlis, which is produced in the land of Scandinavia; it has never been seen in this city, although we have had descriptions of it from many persons; it is not unlike the moose, but has no joints in the hind leg. Hence, it never lies down, but reclines against a tree while it sleeps; it can only be taken by previously cutting into the tree, and thus laying a trap for it, as otherwise, it would escape through its swiftness. Its upper lip is so extremely large, for which reason it is obliged to go backwards when grazing; otherwise, by moving onwards, the lip would get doubled up.

=== As food ===
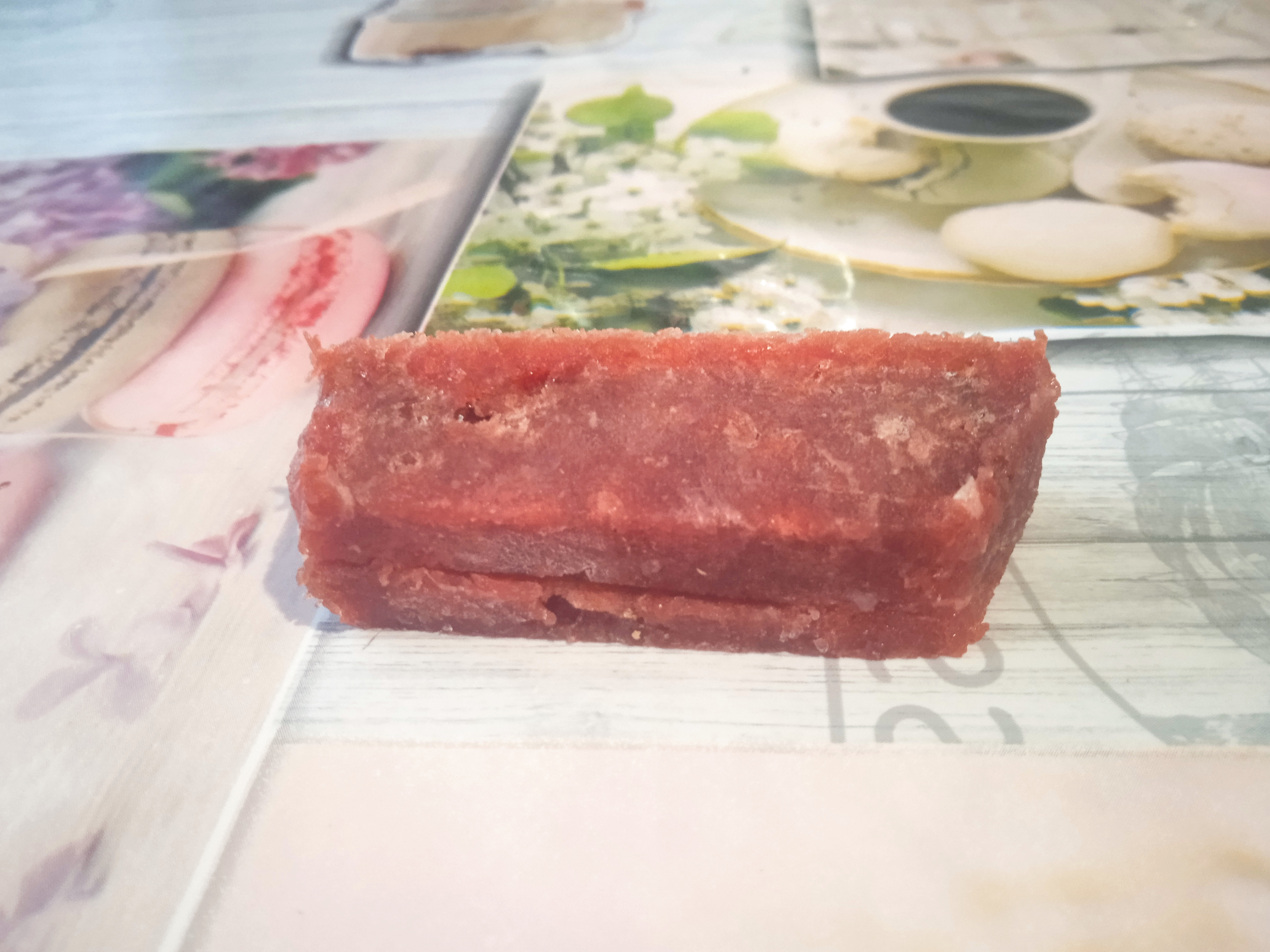
Moose meat

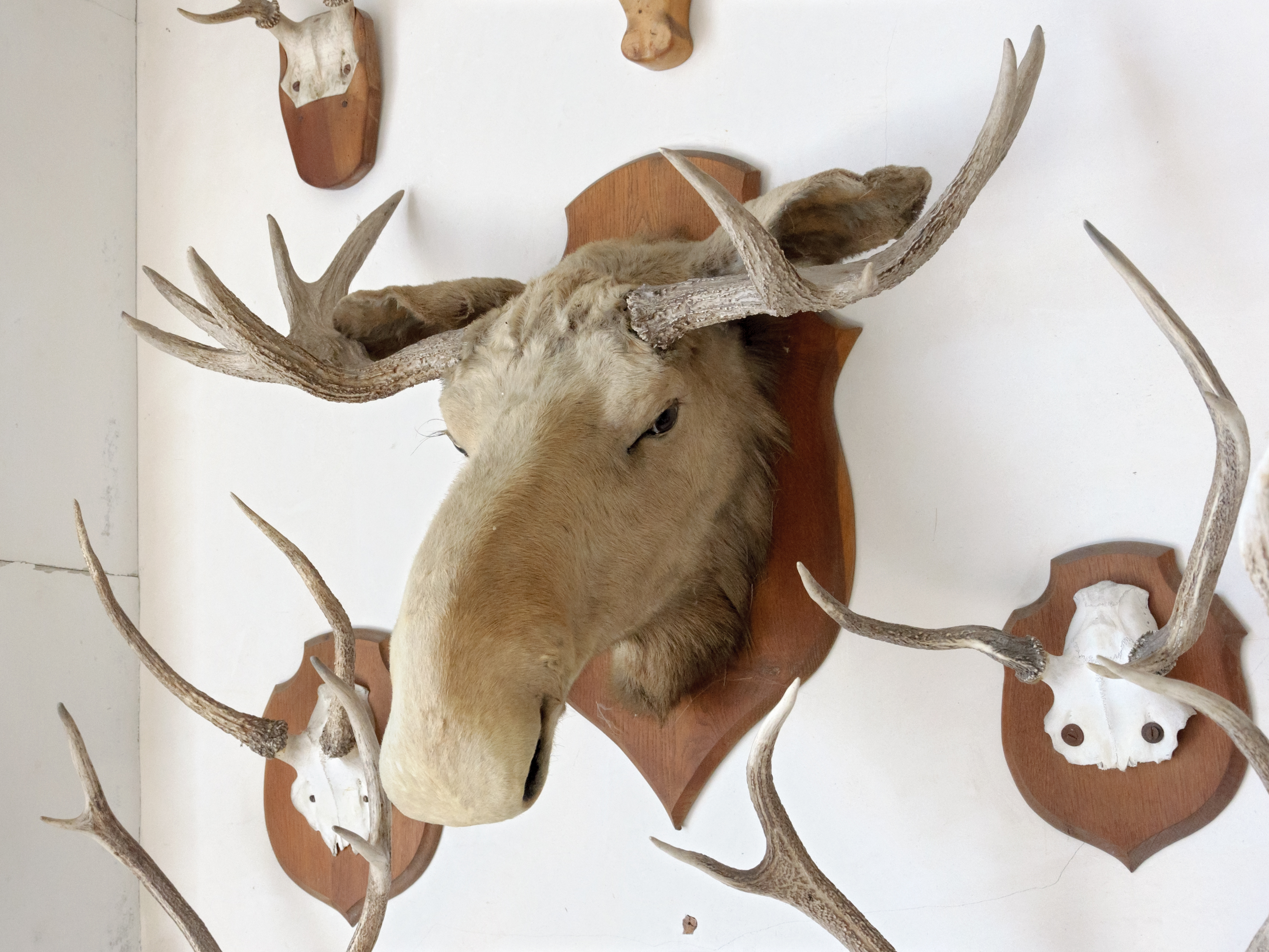
Moose trophy head

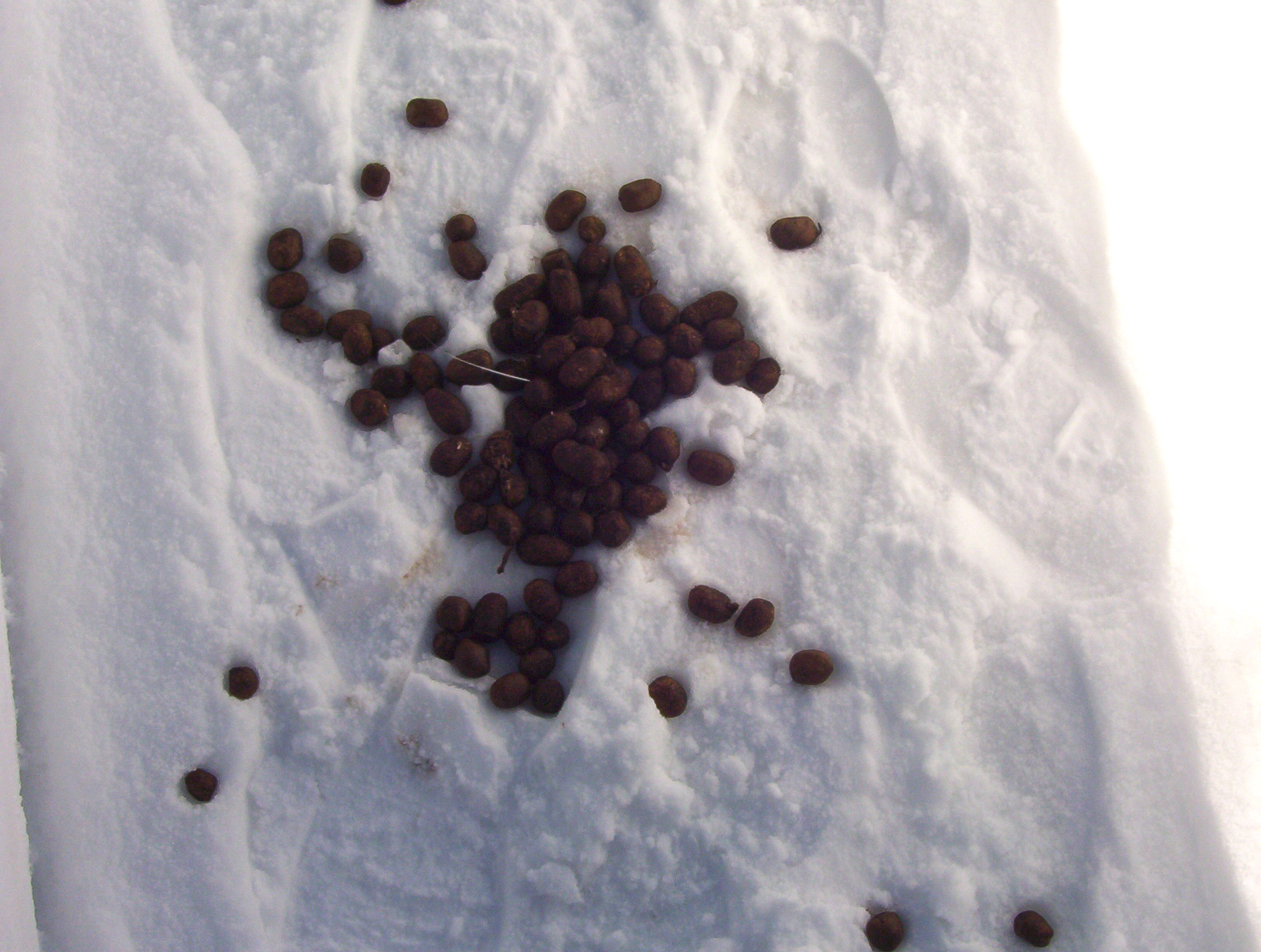
Moose scat is commonly found on trails. Some souvenir shops sell bags of it, sealed with shellac and labeled with humorous names.

Moose are hunted as a game species in many of the countries where they are found. Moose meat tastes, wrote Henry David Thoreau in The Maine Woods, "like tender beef, with perhaps more flavour; sometimes like veal". While the flesh has protein levels similar to those of other comparable red meats (e.g. beef, deer, and wapiti), it has a low fat content, and the fat that is present consists of a higher proportion of polyunsaturated fats than saturated fats.

Dr. Valerius Geist, who emigrated to Canada from the Soviet Union, wrote in his 1999 book Moose: Behaviour, Ecology, Conservation:

In Sweden, no fall menu is without a mouthwatering moose dish. The Swedes fence their highways to reduce moose fatalities and design moose-proof cars. Sweden is less than half as large as the Canadian province of British Columbia, but the annual take of moose in Sweden—upward of 150,000—is twice that of the total moose harvest in North America.

Boosting moose populations in Alaska for hunting purposes is one of the reasons given for allowing aerial or airborne methods to remove wolves in designated areas, e.g., Craig Medred: "A kill of 124 wolves would thus translate to [the survival of] 1488 moose or 2976 caribou or some combination thereof". Some scientists believe that this artificial inflation of game populations is actually detrimental to both caribou and moose populations as well as the ecosystem as a whole. This is because studies have shown that when these game populations are artificially boosted, it leads to both habitat destruction and a crash in these populations.

==== Consumption of offal ====
Cadmium levels are high in Finnish moose liver and kidneys, with the result that consumption of these organs from moose more than one year old is prohibited in Finland. As a result of a study reported in 1988, the Ontario Ministry of Natural Resources recommended against the consumption of moose and deer kidneys and livers. Levels of cadmium were found to be considerably higher than in Scandinavia. The New Brunswick Department of Natural Resources advises hunters not to consume cervid offal.

Cadmium intake has been found to be elevated amongst all consumers of moose meat, though the meat was found to contribute only slightly to the daily cadmium intake. However the consumption of moose liver or kidneys significantly increased cadmium intake, with the study revealing that heavy consumers of moose organs have a relatively narrow safety margin below the levels which would probably cause adverse health effects.

=== Vehicle collisions ===
The center of mass of a moose is above the hood of most passenger cars. In a collision, the impact crushes the front roof beams and individuals in the front seats. Collisions of this type are frequently fatal; seat belts and airbags offer little protection. In collisions with higher vehicles (such as trucks), most of the deformation is to the front of the vehicle and the passenger compartment is largely spared. Moose collisions have prompted the development of a vehicle test referred to as the "moose test" (Swedish: Älgtest, German: Elchtest). A Massachusetts study found that moose–vehicular collisions had a very high human fatality rate and that such collisions caused the death of 3% of the Massachusetts moose population annually.

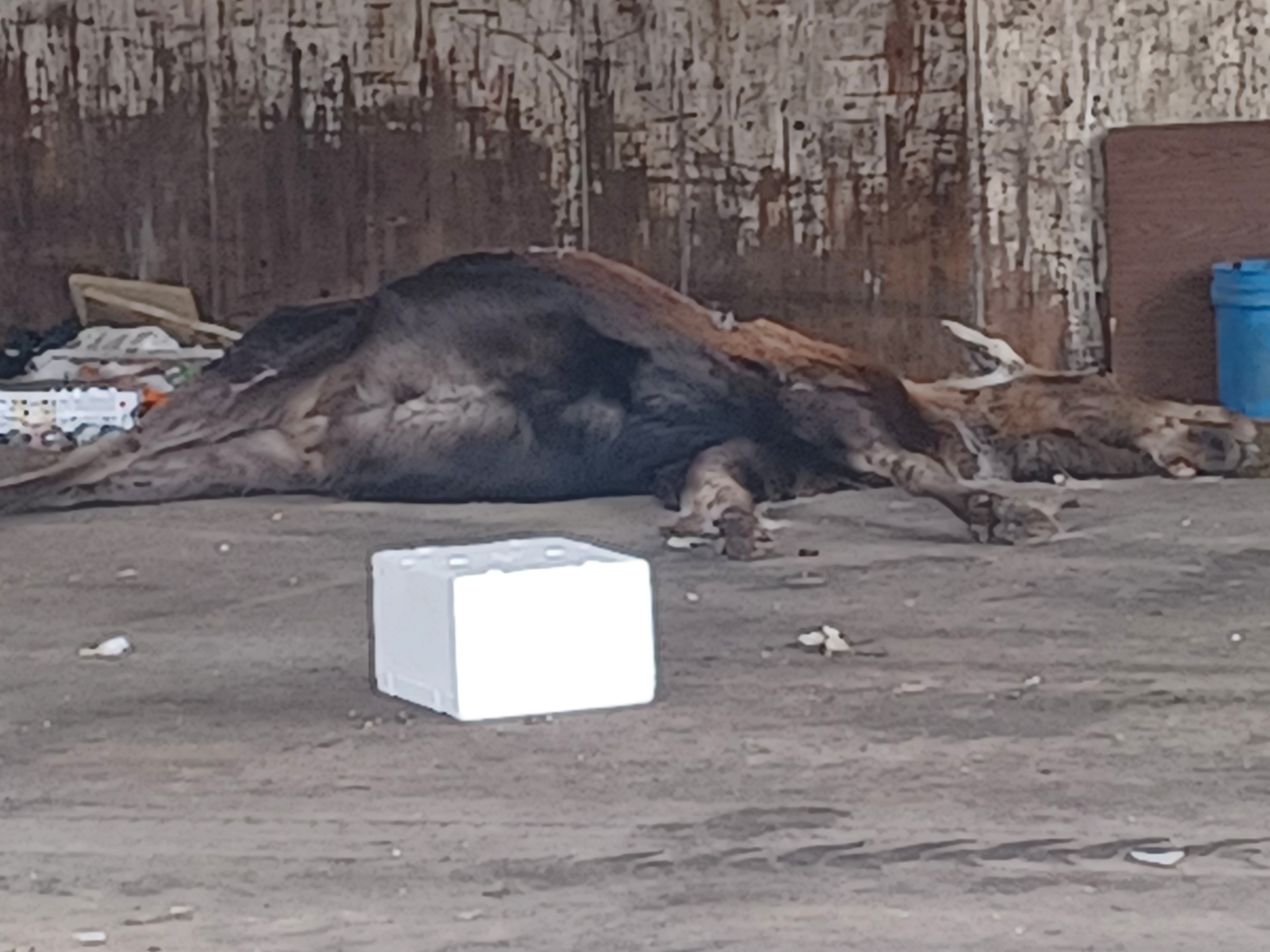
Moose carcass, cause of death unknown, at a solid waste transfer facility in Alaska

Moose warning signs are used on roads in regions where there is a danger of collision with the animal. The triangular warning signs common in Sweden, Norway, and Finland have become coveted souvenirs among tourists traveling in these countries, causing road authorities so much expense that the moose signs have been replaced with imageless generic warning signs in some regions.

In Ontario, Canada, an estimated 265 moose die each year as a result of collision with trains (as of 2019). Moose–train collisions were more frequent in winters with above-average snowfall. In January 2008, the Norwegian newspaper Aftenposten estimated that some 13,000 moose had died in collisions with Norwegian trains since 2000. The state agency in charge of railroad infrastructure (Jernbaneverket) plans to spend 80 million Norwegian kroner to reduce collision rate in the future by fencing the railways, clearing vegetation from near the tracks, and providing alternative snow-free feeding places for the animals elsewhere.

In the Canadian province of New Brunswick, collisions between automobiles and moose are frequent enough that all new highways have fences to prevent moose from accessing the road, as has long been done in Finland, Norway, and Sweden. A demonstration project, Highway 7 between Fredericton and Saint John, which has one of the highest frequencies of moose collisions in the province, did not have these fences until 2008, although it was and continues to be extremely well signed. Newfoundland and Labrador recommended that motorists use caution between dusk and dawn because that is when moose are most active and most difficult to see, increasing the risk of collisions. Local moose sightings are often reported on radio stations so that motorists can take care while driving in particular areas. An electronic "moose detection system" was installed on two sections of the Trans-Canada Highway in Newfoundland in 2011, but the system proved unreliable and was removed in 2015. As of 2024, the moose population in Newfoundland was increasing along with the number of road accidents.

In Sweden, a road will not be fenced unless it experiences at least one moose accident per km per year.

In eastern Germany, where the scarce population is slowly increasing, there were two road accidents involving moose since 2000.

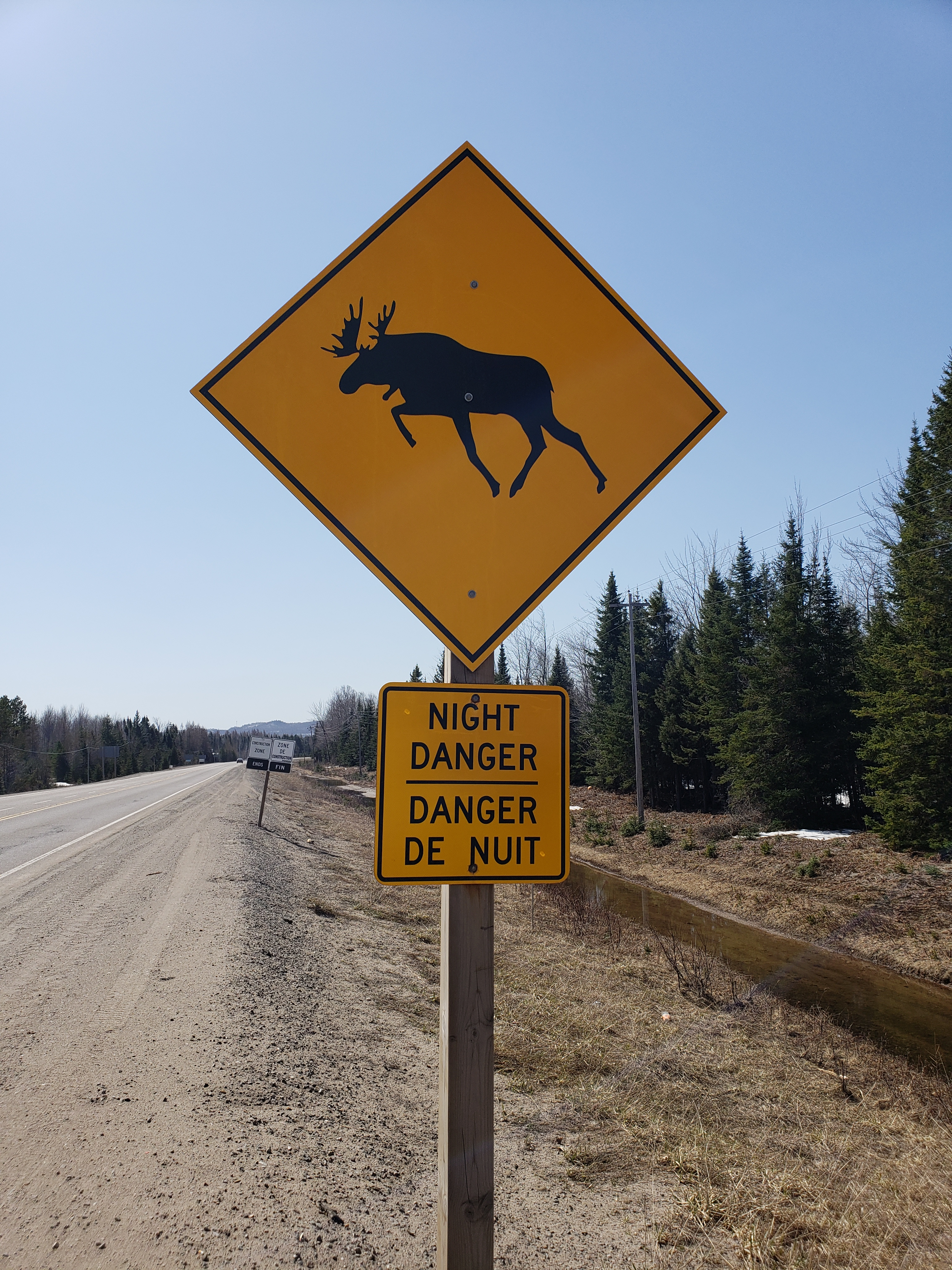
Canadian road sign

Finnish road sign

Norwegian road sign

Swedish road sign

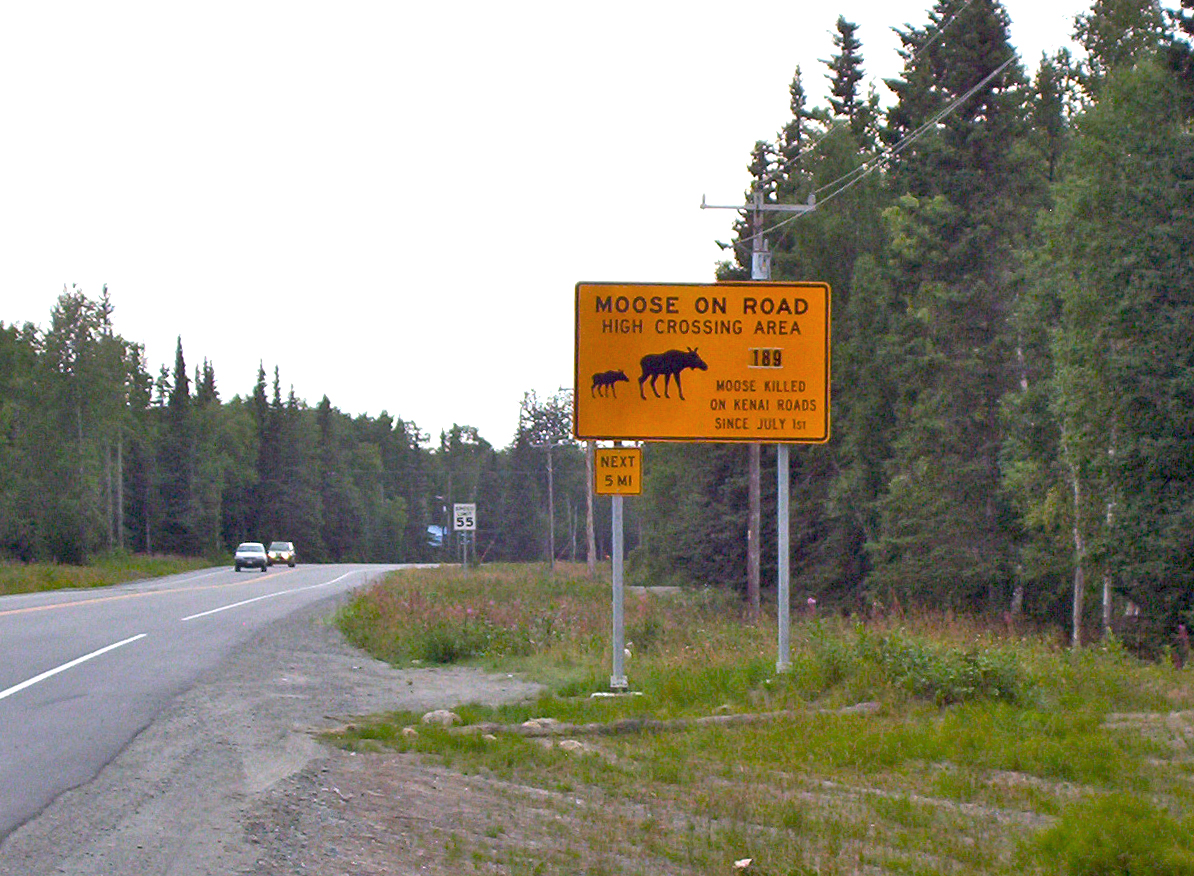
Warning sign in Alaska where trees and brush are trimmed along high moose crossing areas so that moose can be seen as they approach the road

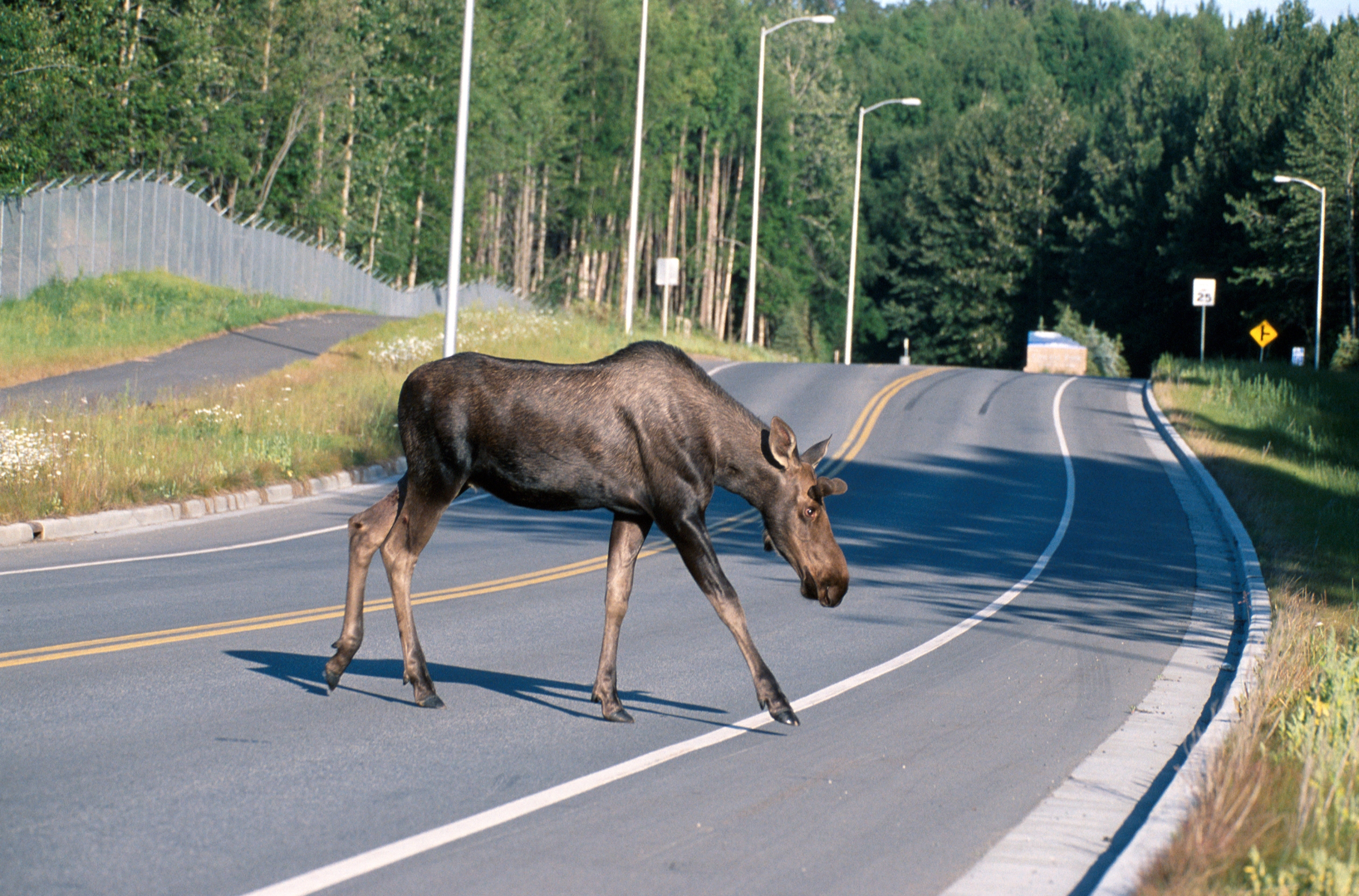
Moose (A. a. gigas) crossing a road in Alaska

=== Domestication ===
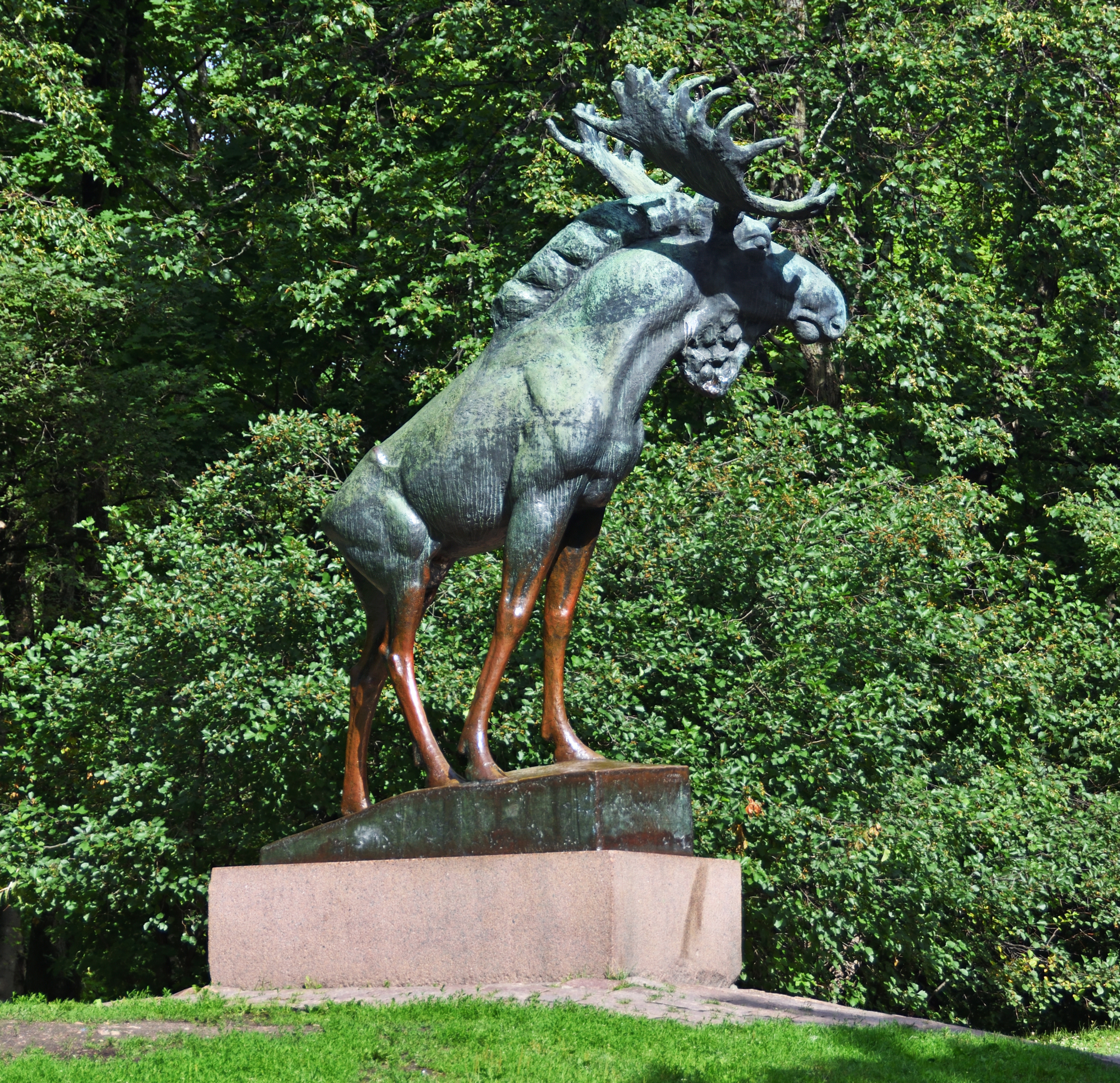
Sculpture by the Finnish Jussi Mäntynen from 1923. The statue was preserved intact from the Second World War and is located in Vyborg.

De novo domestication of moose was investigated in the Soviet Union before World War II. Early experiments were inconclusive, but with the creation of a moose farm at Pechora-Ilych Nature Reserve in 1949, a small-scale moose domestication program was started, involving attempts at selective breeding of animals on the basis of their behavioural characteristics. Since 1963, the program has continued at Kostroma Moose Farm, which had a herd of 33 tame moose as of 2003. Although at this stage the farm is not expected to be a profit-making enterprise, it obtains some income from the sale of moose milk and from visiting tourist groups. Its main value, however, is seen in the opportunities it offers for the research in the physiology and behavior of the moose, as well as in the insights it provides into the general principles of animal domestication.

In Sweden, there was a debate in the late 18th century about the national value of using the moose as a domestic animal. Among other things, the moose was proposed to be used in postal distribution, and there was a suggestion to develop a moose-mounted cavalry. Such proposals remained unimplemented, mainly because the extensive hunting for moose that was deregulated in the 1790s nearly drove it to extinction. While there have been documented cases of individual moose (e.g., Älgen Stolta) being used for riding and/or pulling carts and sleds, Björklöf concludes no wide-scale usage has occurred outside fairy tales.

=== Heraldry ===
As one of the Canadian national symbols, the moose occurs on several Canadian coats of arms, including Newfoundland and Labrador, and Ontario. Moose are also commonly found on northern European coats of arms. For example, in Finland, it appears on the coats of arms of Hirvensalmi and Mäntsälä municipalities. The seals of Maine and Michigan feature moose as well.

A moose in the coat of arms of Hirvensalmi, Finland

== See also ==
- Älgen Stolta, a rare example of a domesticated moose
