= Antler =

Skull projections found in deer

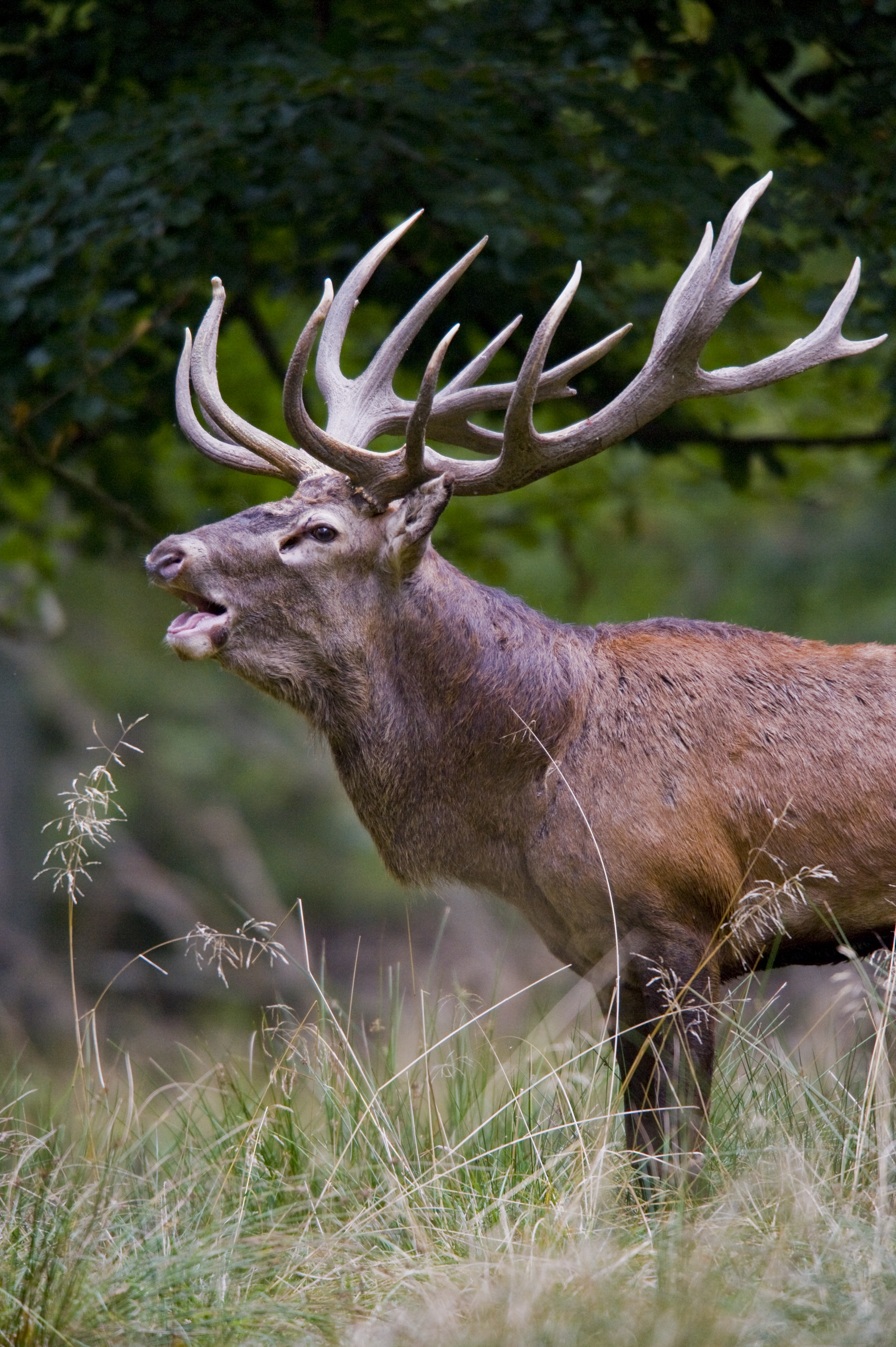
Mature red deer stag, Denmark

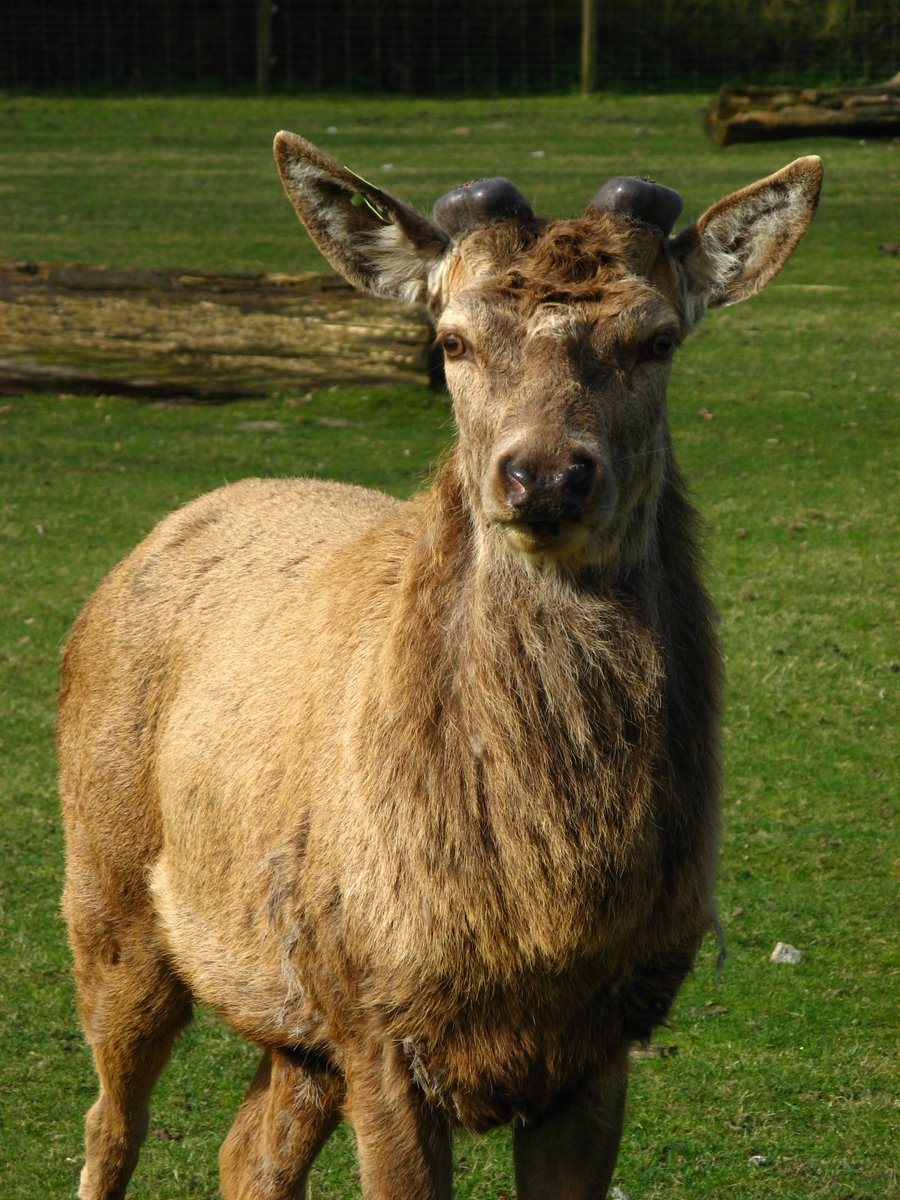
Red deer at the beginning of the growing season

Antlers are extensions of an animal's skull found in members of the Cervidae (deer) family. Antlers are a single structure composed of bone, cartilage, fibrous tissue, skin, nerves, and blood vessels. They are generally found only on males, with the exception of reindeer/caribou. Antlers are shed and regrown each year and function primarily as objects of sexual attraction and as weapons.

== Etymology ==
Antler comes from the Old French antoillier (see present French : "Andouiller", from ant-, meaning before, oeil, meaning eye and -ier, a suffix indicating an action or state of being) possibly from some form of an unattested Latin word *anteocularis, "before the eye" (and applied to the word for "branch" or "horn").

== Structure and development ==
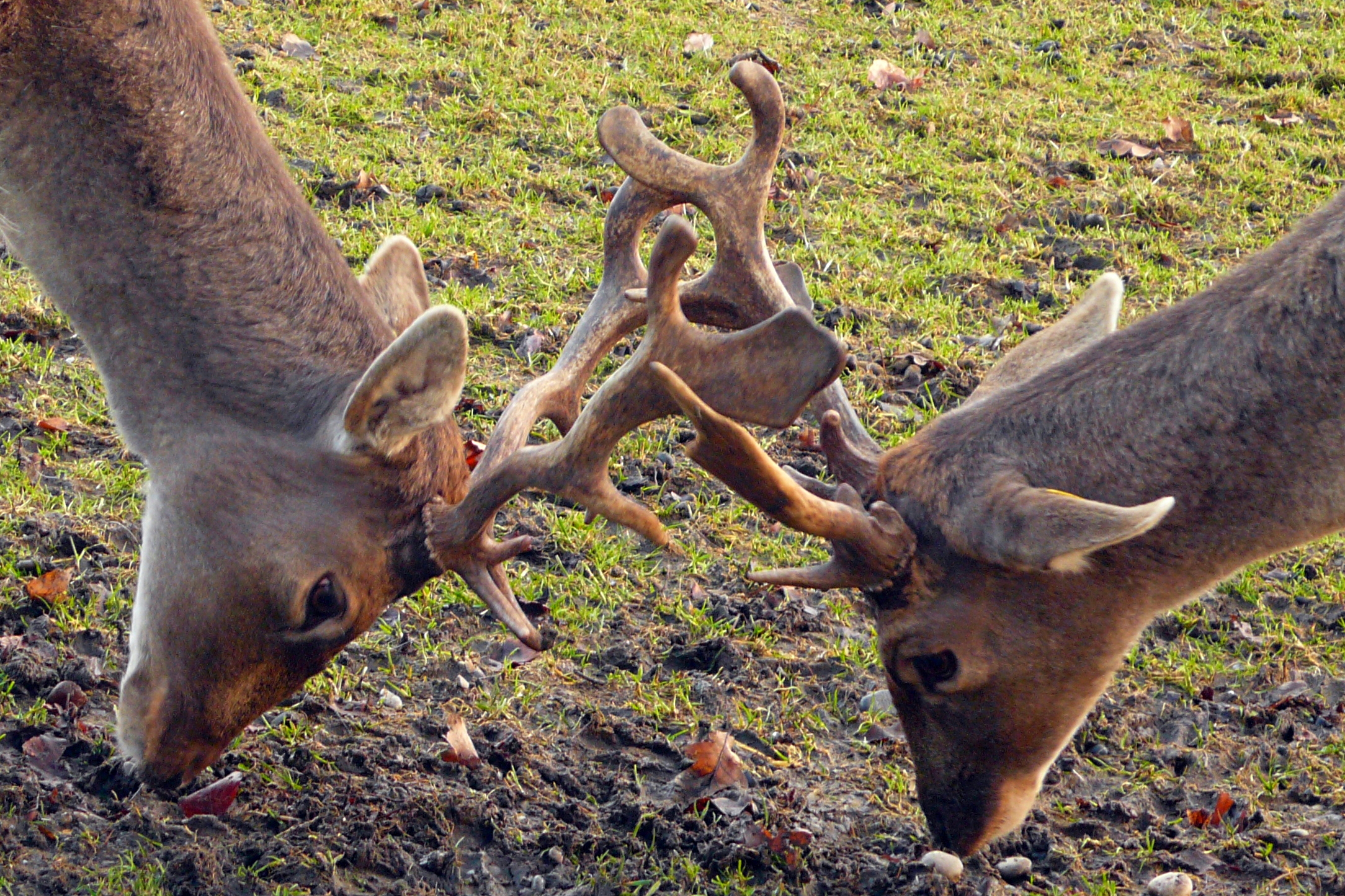
Male fallow deer fighting

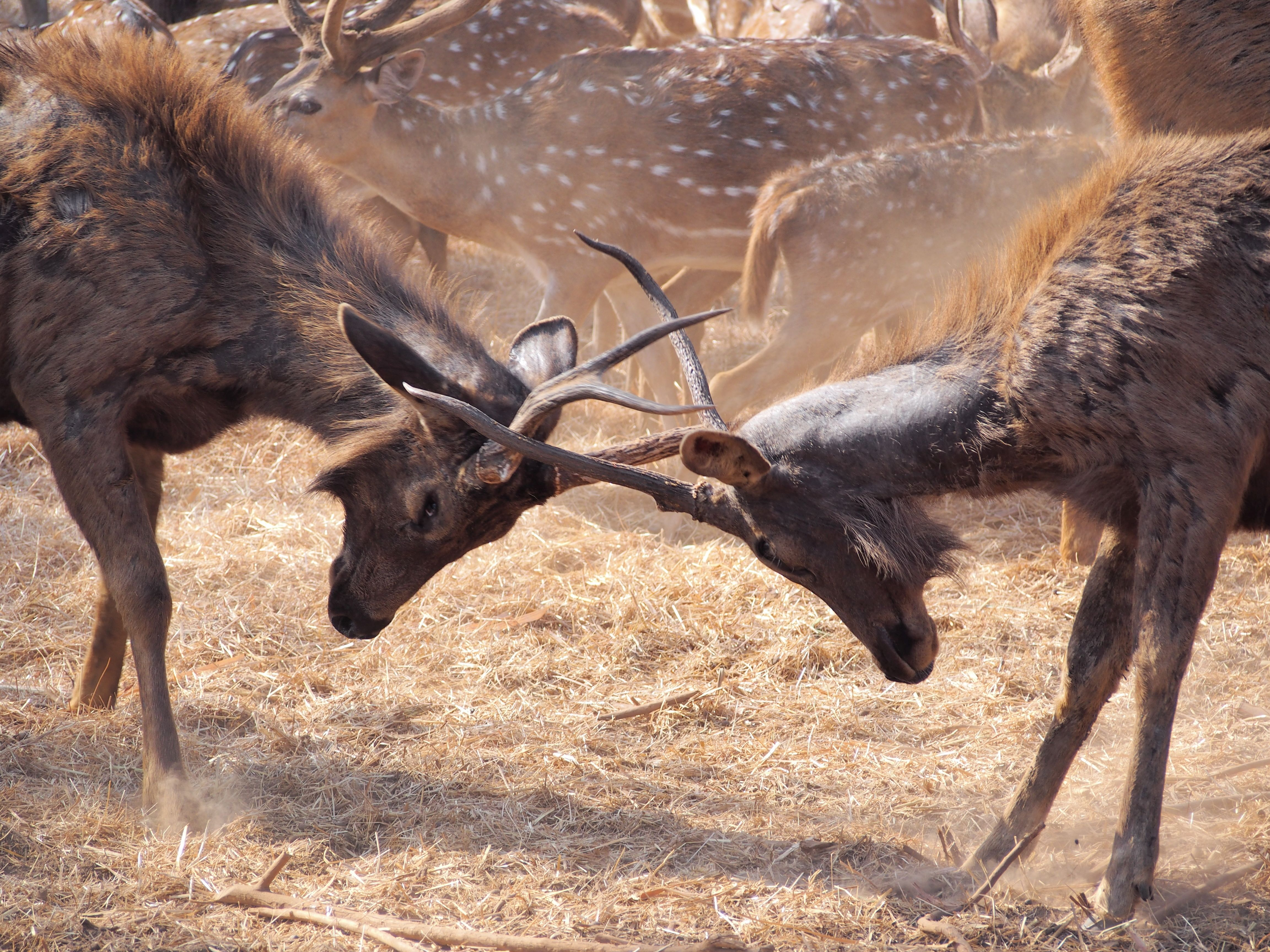
Two sambar deer fighting, Silvassa, India

Antlers are unique to cervids. The ancestors of deer had tusks (long upper canine teeth). In most species, antlers appear to replace tusks. However, one modern species (the water deer) has tusks and no antlers and the muntjacs have small antlers and tusks. The musk deer, which are not true cervids, also bear tusks in place of antlers.

In contrast to antlers, horns—found on pronghorns and bovids, such as sheep, goats, bison and cattle—are two-part structures that usually do not shed. A horn's interior of bone is covered by an exterior sheath made of keratin (the same material as human fingernails and toenails).

Antlers are usually found only on males. Only reindeer (known as caribou in North America) have antlers on the females, and these are normally smaller than those of the males. Nevertheless, fertile does from other species of deer have the capacity to produce antlers on occasion, usually due to increased testosterone levels. The "horns" of a pronghorn (which is not a cervid but a antilocaprid) meet some of the criteria of antlers, but are not considered true antlers because they contain keratin.

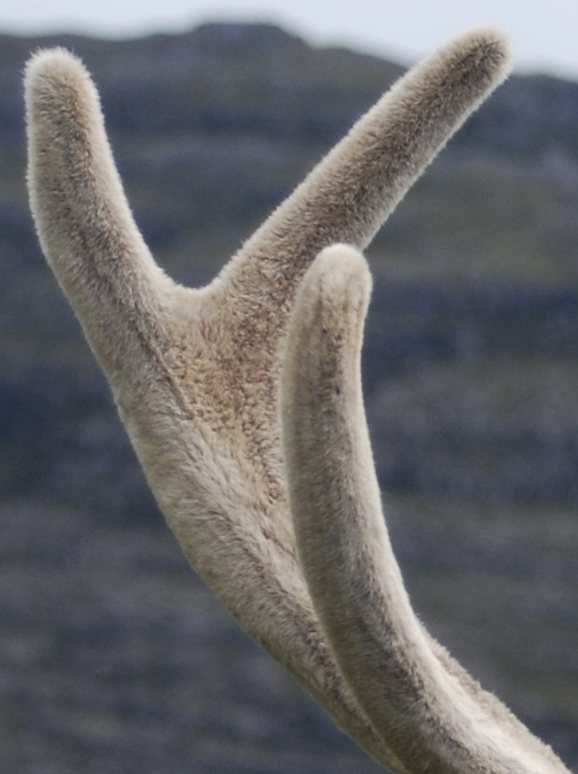
An antler on a red deer stag. Velvet covers a growing antler, providing blood flow that supplies oxygen and nutrients.

Each antler grows from an attachment point on the skull called a pedicle. While an antler is growing, it is covered with highly vascular skin called velvet, which supplies oxygen and nutrients to the growing bone. Antlers are considered one of the most exaggerated cases of male secondary sexual traits in the animal kingdom, and grow faster than any other mammal bone. Growth occurs at the tip, and is initially cartilage, which is later replaced by bone tissue. Once the antler has achieved its full size, the velvet is lost and the antler's bone dies. This dead bone structure is the mature antler. In most cases, the bone at the base is destroyed by osteoclasts and the antlers fall off at some point. As a result of their fast growth rate, antlers are considered a handicap since there is an immense nutritional demand on deer to re-grow antlers annually, and thus can be honest signals of metabolic efficiency and food gathering capability.

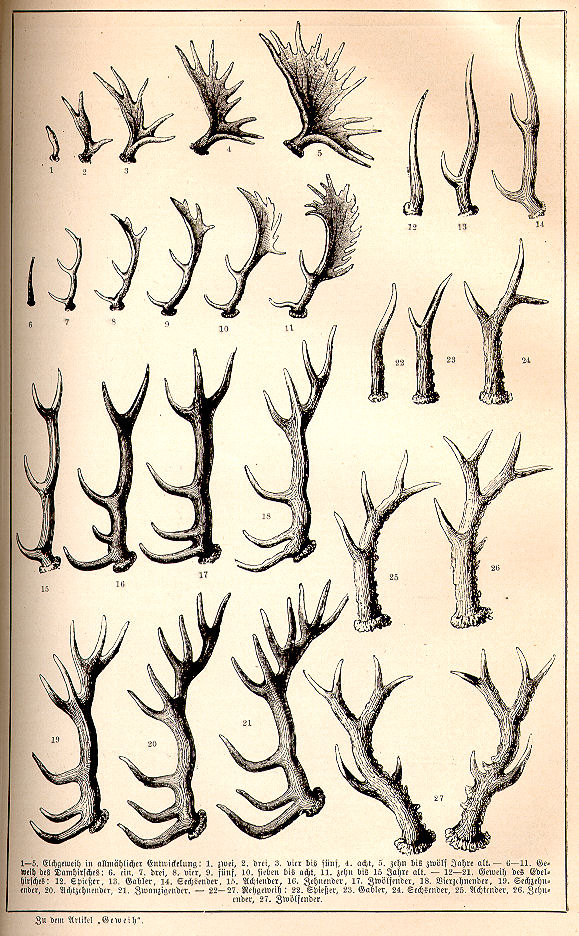
Increasing size of antlers year on year in different European game species, 1891 illustration

In most Arctic and temperate-zone species, antler growth and shedding is annual, and is controlled by the length of daylight. Although the antlers are regrown each year, their size varies with the age of the animal in many species, increasing annually over several years before reaching maximum size. In tropical species, antlers may be shed at any time of year, and in some species such as the sambar, antlers are shed at different times in the year depending on multiple factors. Some equatorial deer such as Bornean muntjacs may never shed their antlers.

A Chital stag, showing the velvet on its antlers.

A 2019 study published in Science identified eight genes active in antler formation that are normally associated with bone cancer, particularly osteosarcoma. Additional tumor-suppressing and tumor-growth-inhibiting genes were determined to be responsible for regulating antler growth. This was taken to indicate that antler formation is more similar to a highly controlled form of cancer growth than to normal bone development.

Antlers function as both weapons in male-male competition and as displays of sexual ornaments for females. Because mature antlers are no longer living during combat, antler fractures are incapable of being repaired following competition. A study in 2019 hypothesized that the periodic casting and regrowth of antlers might have evolved as a way to ensure the availability of complete antler sets to display each year. Antler regeneration in male deer ensures that every mating season begins on a clean slate, as an increase in branching size and complexity happens each regeneration cycle in an individual.

== Mechanical properties ==
Bones typically serve a structural purpose, with load bearing abilities that are greater than any other part of an animal's body. Bones typically differ in shape and properties to better fit their overall function. Antlers are not structural and typically have different properties when compared to structural bones like femurs.

While antlers are classified as bone, they differ in some ways from human bones and bovine bones. Bone is characterized as being made up of primarily collagen and a mineral phase. In antlers, the mineral content is considerably lower than other examples of bone tissue, while having a high volume of collagen. This leads antlers to having lower yield strength and stiffness, but higher fracture toughness when compared to human cortical bone. Mineral content differs among species and also depends on the food availability. In recent studies, increase in mineral content has been linked to the increase in stiffness with a decrease in fracture toughness.

Further, bones are highly anisotropic due to their hierarchical structure. Thus, mechanical properties are highly dependent on testing conditions and directions. Due to their cylindrical shape, antlers can be tested using bending along three different orientations. Bend testing in these orientations have resulted in different mechanical properties. In samples from antler bone taken in the transverse direction, an elastic modulus of 8.92–10.02 GPa was reported. For the longitudinal and radial orientations, the elastic modulus was 7.19–8.23 and 4.01–4.27 GPa respectively. The transverse direction was overall found to be the stronger orientation with higher mechanical properties. The ultimate tensile strength of 262.96–274.38 MPa in the transverse direction was statistically significant when compared to the longitudinal and radial directions' values of 46.91–48.55 and 41.75–43.67 MPa.

Tensile testing of antler bones has also been conducted to compare to bovine femur results. The antler samples were tested in dry and wet conditions as done in other studies. The wetness of a sample resulted in a difference in mean maximum strain: 1.46% and 2.2%, dry and wet respectively. Further, the ultimate tensile strength of wet, dry and bovine difference showed differences as well: 188 MPa, 108 MPa, and 99.2 MPa for dry, wet and bovine samples respectively. Similarly, the elastic modulus for dry samples was 17.1 GPa, 7.5 GPa for wet samples, and 17.7 GPa for bovine femur. This difference in elastic modulus is due to the difference in function of a bovine femur versus an antler. Bovine femurs must withstand greater stresses, holding up the body of the animal, whereas an antler is used for sexual selection and competition.

== Function ==
=== Sexual selection ===
The principal means of evolution of antlers is sexual selection, which operates via two mechanisms: male-to-male competition (behaviorally, physiologically) and female mate choice. Male-male competition can take place in two forms. First, they can compete behaviorally where males use their antlers as weapons to compete for access to mates; second, they can compete physiologically where males present their antlers to display their strength and fertility competitiveness to compete for access to mates. Males with the largest antlers are more likely to obtain mates and achieve the highest fertilization success due to their competitiveness, dominance and high phenotypic quality. Whether this is a result of male-male fighting or display, or of female choosiness differs depending on the species as the shape, size, and function of antlers vary between species.

=== Heritability and reproductive advantage ===
There is evidence to support that antler size influences mate selection in the red deer, and has a heritable component. Despite this, a 30-year study showed no shift in the median size of antlers in a population of red deer, so a large antler size appears to confer no reproductive advantage. The lack of response could be explained by environmental covariance, meaning that lifetime breeding success is determined by an unmeasured trait which is phenotypically correlated with antler size but for which there is no genetic correlation of antler growth. Alternatively, the lack of response could be explained by the relationship between heterozygosity and antler size, which states that males heterozygous at multiple loci, including MHC loci, have larger antlers. The evolutionary response of traits that depend on heterozygosity is slower than traits that are dependent on additive genetic components and thus the evolutionary change is slower than expected. A third possibility is that the costs of having larger antlers (resource use, and mobility detriments, for instance) exert enough selective pressure to offset the advantage in attracting mates; thereby stabilizing antler size in the population.

=== Protection against predation ===
If antlers functioned only in male–male competition for mates, the best evolutionary strategy would be to shed them immediately after the rutting season, both to free the male from a heavy encumbrance and to give him more time to regrow a larger new pair. Yet antlers are commonly retained through the winter and into the spring, suggesting that they have another use. Wolves in Yellowstone National Park are 3.6 times more likely to attack individual male elk without antlers, or groups of elk in which at least one male is without antlers. Half of all male elk killed by wolves lack antlers, at times in which only one quarter of all males have shed antlers. These findings suggest that antlers have a secondary function in deterring predation.

=== Female antlers in reindeer ===
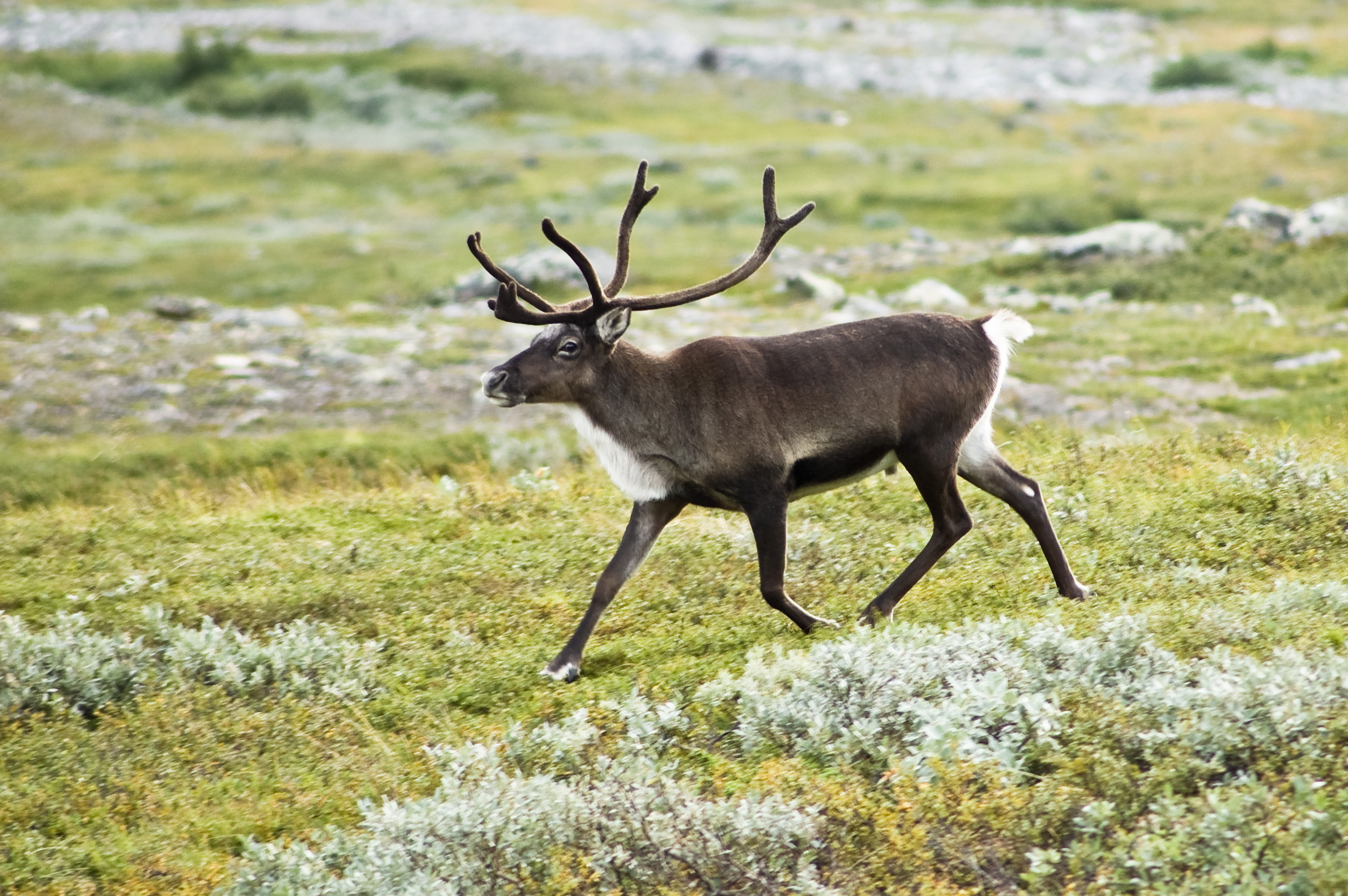
Reindeer in Kebnekaise valley, Sweden

Reindeer (Rangifer tarandus) are the only cervid species that inhabit the Arctic and subarctic regions of the globe, yet their most striking distinction is the presence of pedicles after birth and antlers in both males and females. One possible reason that females of this species evolved antlers is to clear away snow so they can eat the vegetation underneath. Another possible reason is for female competition during winter foraging. Espmark (1964) observed that the presence of antlers on females is related to the hierarchy rank and is a result of the harsh winter conditions and the female dominated parental investment. Males shed their antlers prior to winter, while female antlers are retained throughout winter. Also, female antler size plateaus at the onset of puberty, around age three, while males' antler size increases during their lifetime. This likely reflects the differing life history strategies of the two sexes, where females are resource limited in their reproduction and cannot afford costly antlers, while male reproductive success depends on the size of their antlers because they are under directional sexual selection. In other species of deer, the presence of antlers in females indicates some degree of intersex condition, the frequency of which has been seen to vary from 1.5% to 0.02%.

=== Antenna for hearing ===
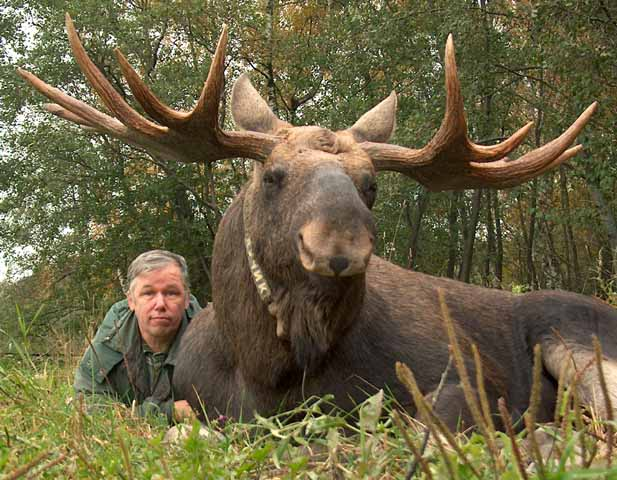
A six-year old moose undergoing domestication at Kostroma Moose Farm

In moose, antlers may act as large hearing aids. Equipped with large, highly adjustable external ears, moose have highly sensitive hearing. Moose with antlers have more sensitive hearing than moose without, and a study of trophy antlers with an artificial ear confirmed that the large flattened (palmate) antler behaves like a parabolic reflector.

== Diversification ==
The diversification of antlers, body size and tusks has been strongly influenced by changes in habitat and behavior (fighting and mating).

=== Capreolinae ===
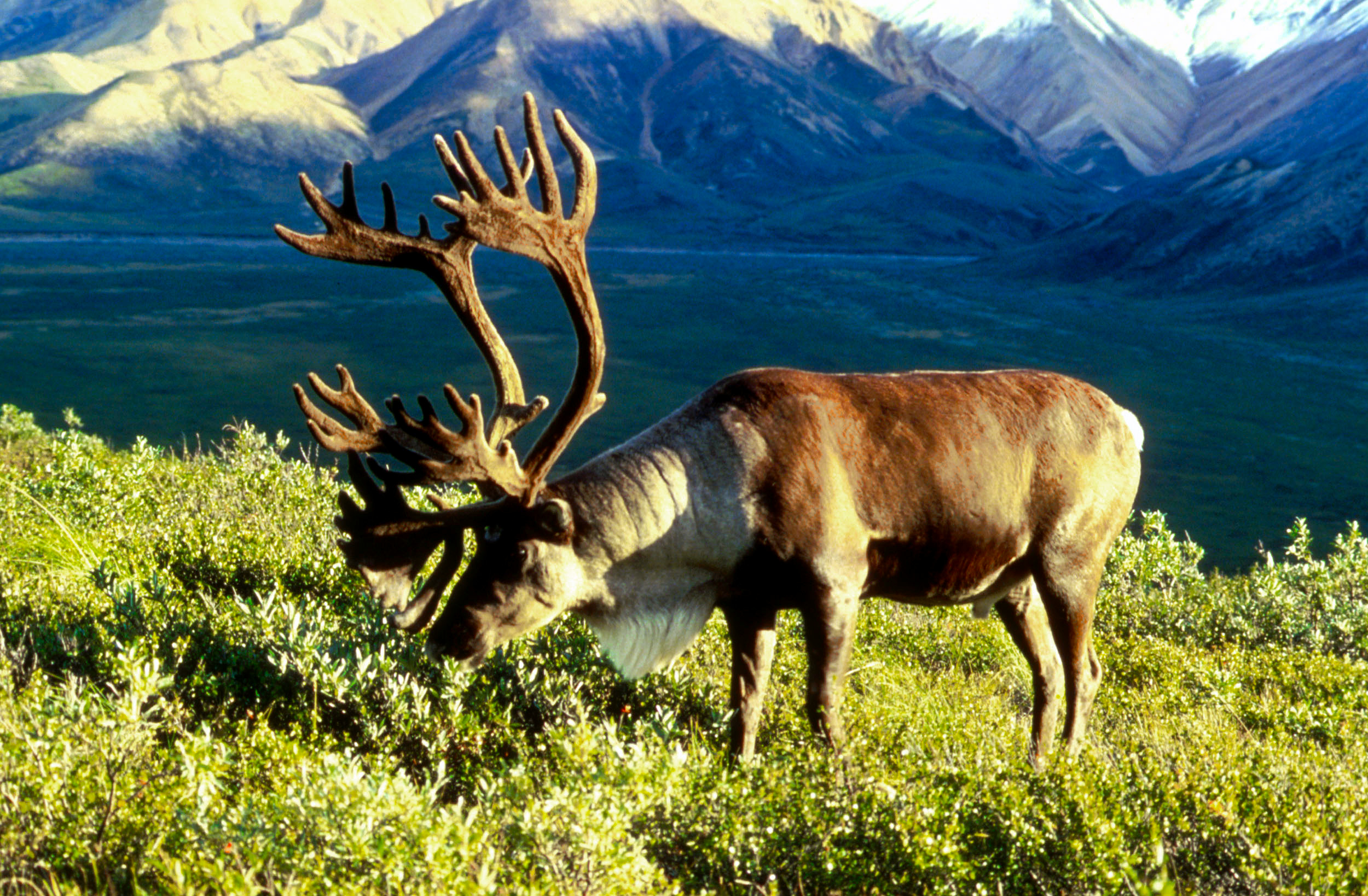
Porcupine caribou

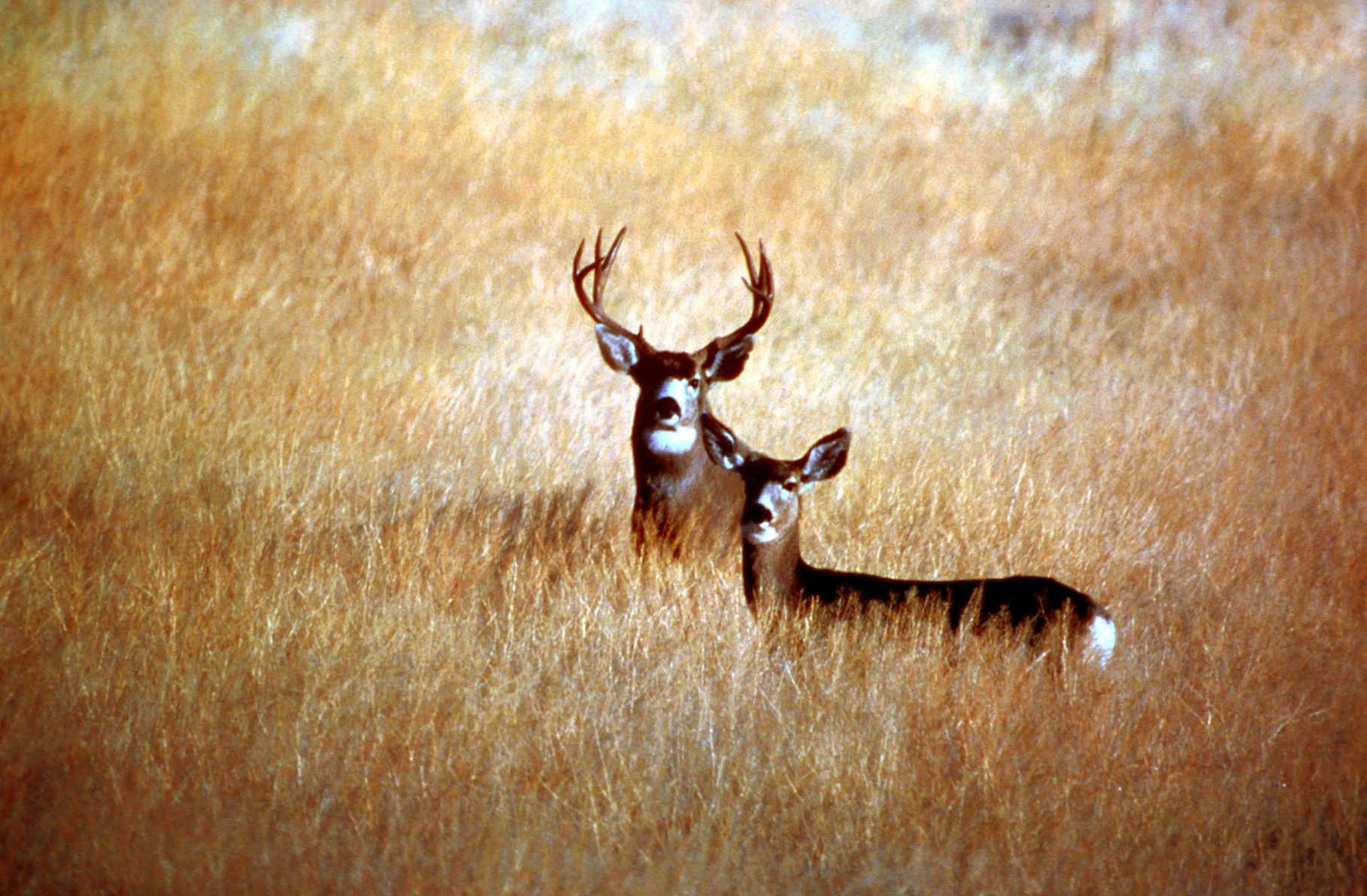
A mule deer with relatively large antlers

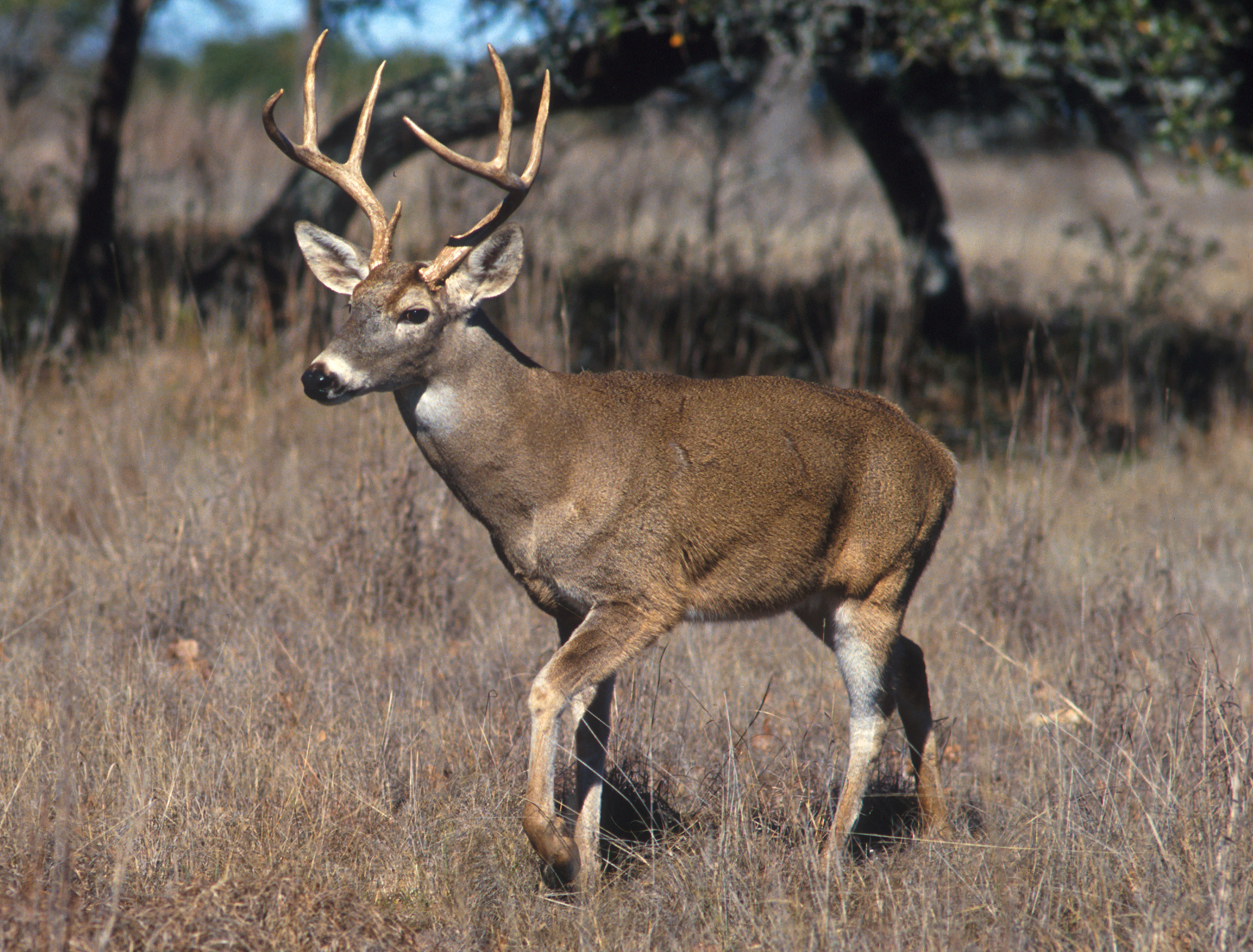
White-tailed deer

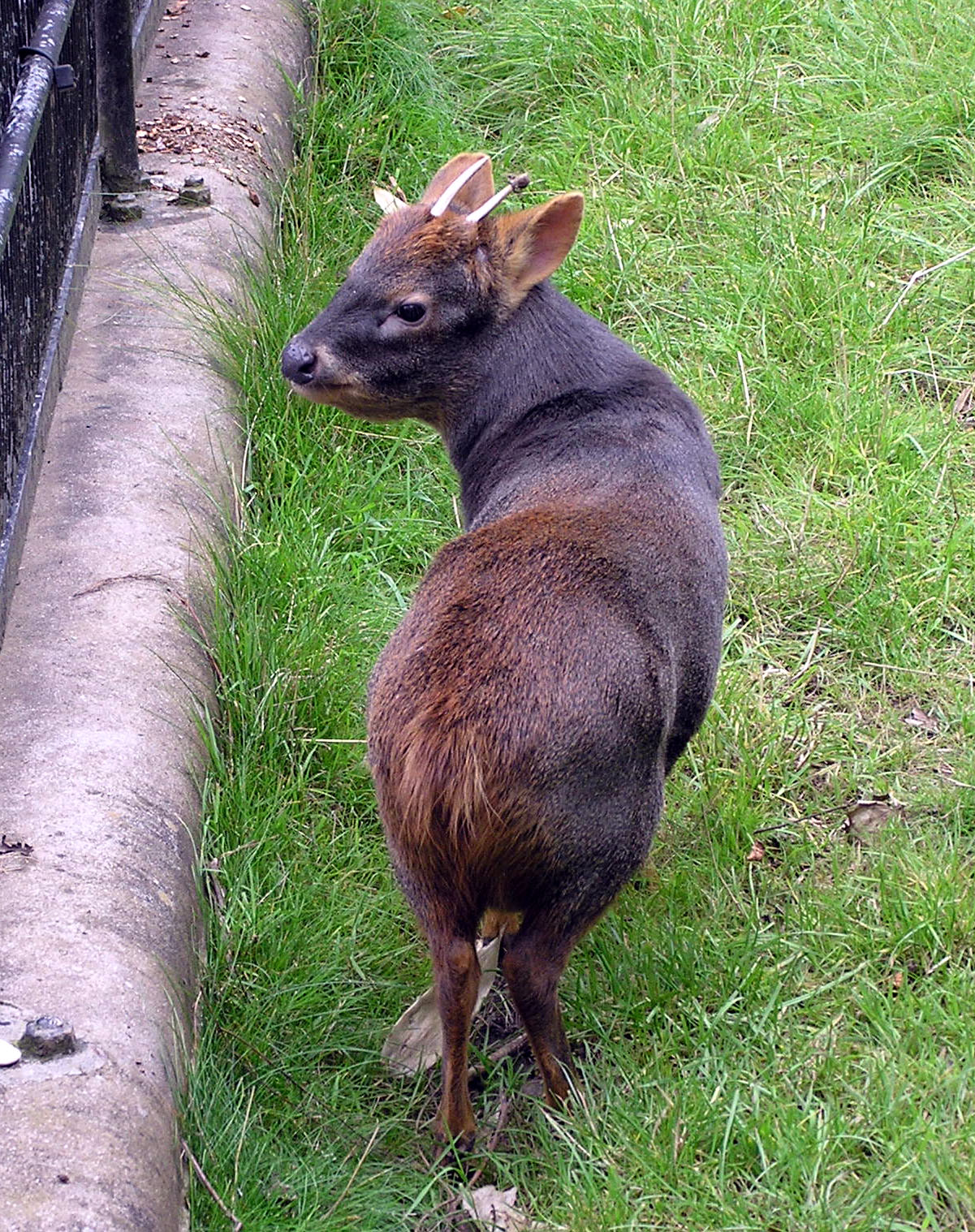
Pudú

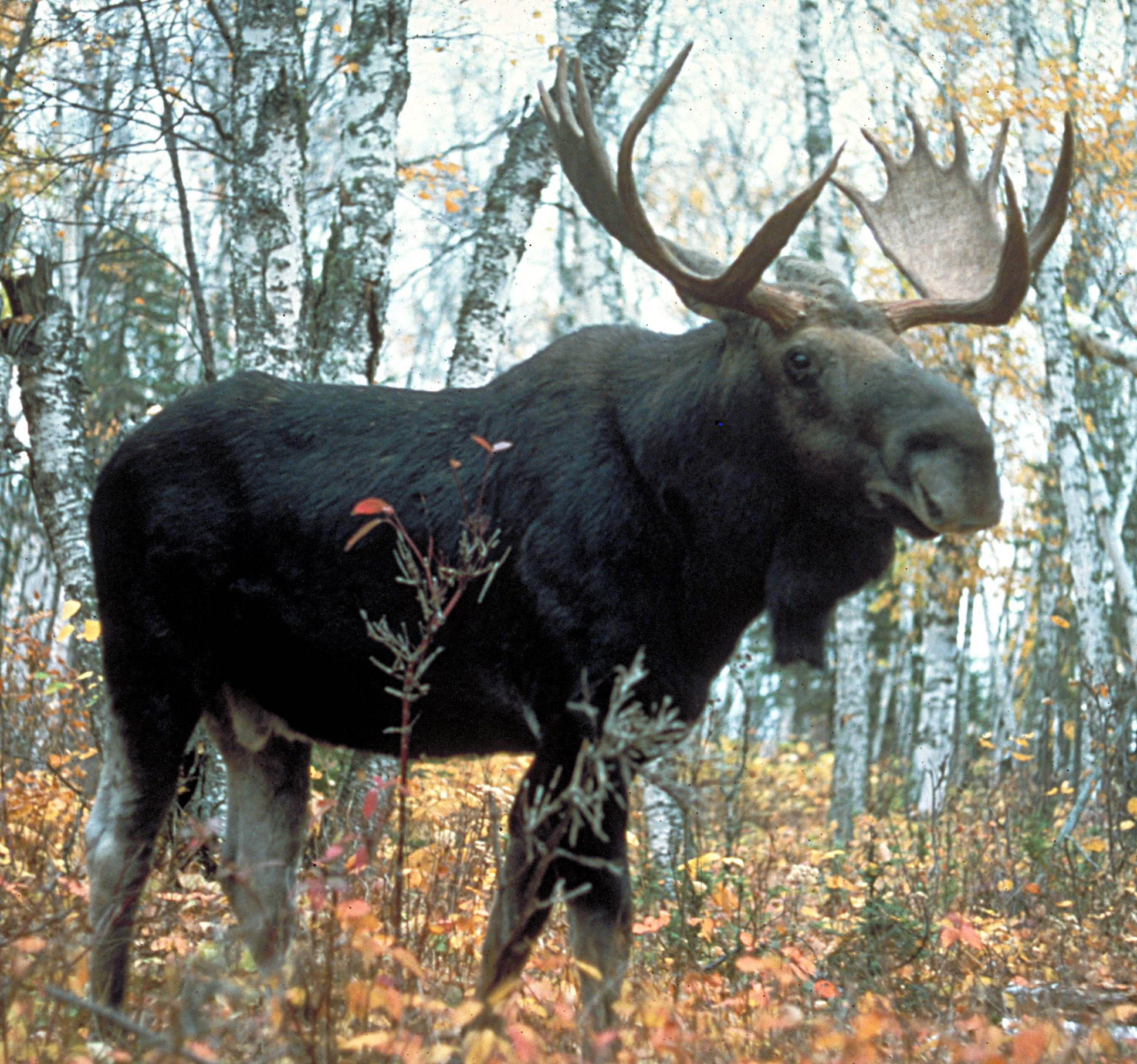
Moose

=== Cervinae ===
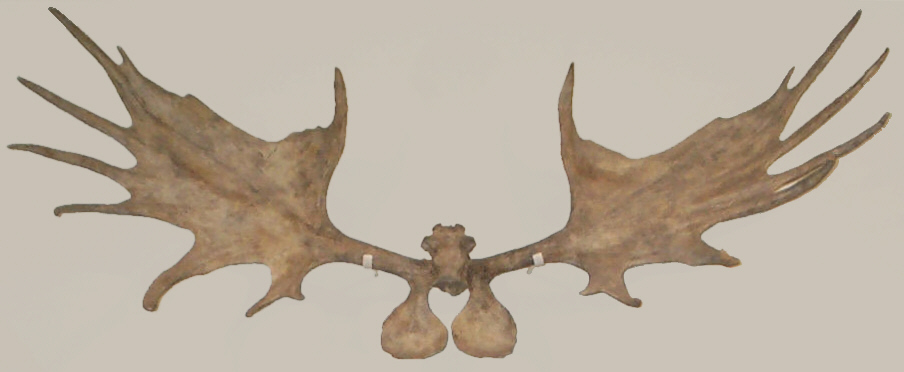
Irish elk, extinct species

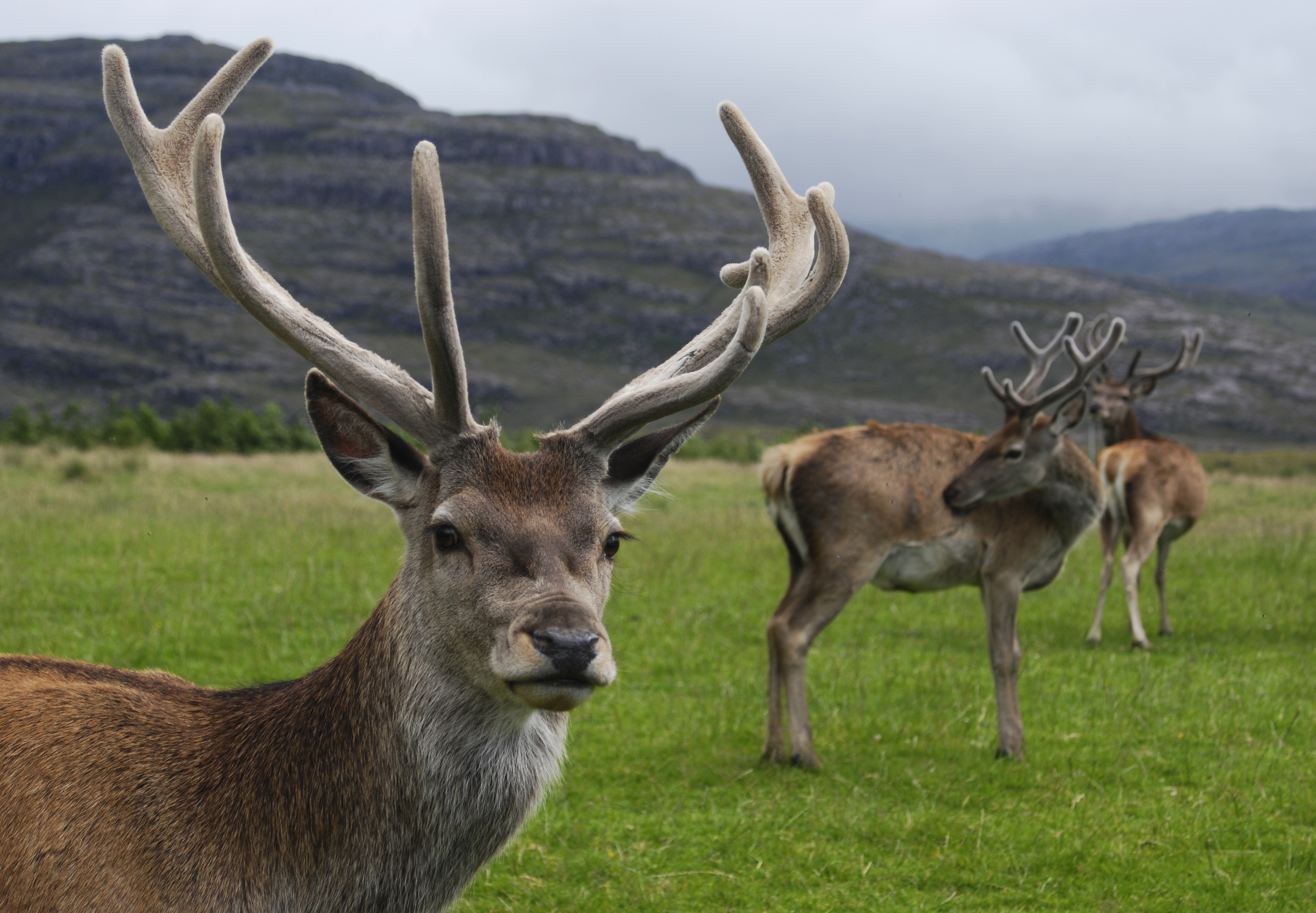
Young red deer, with velvet

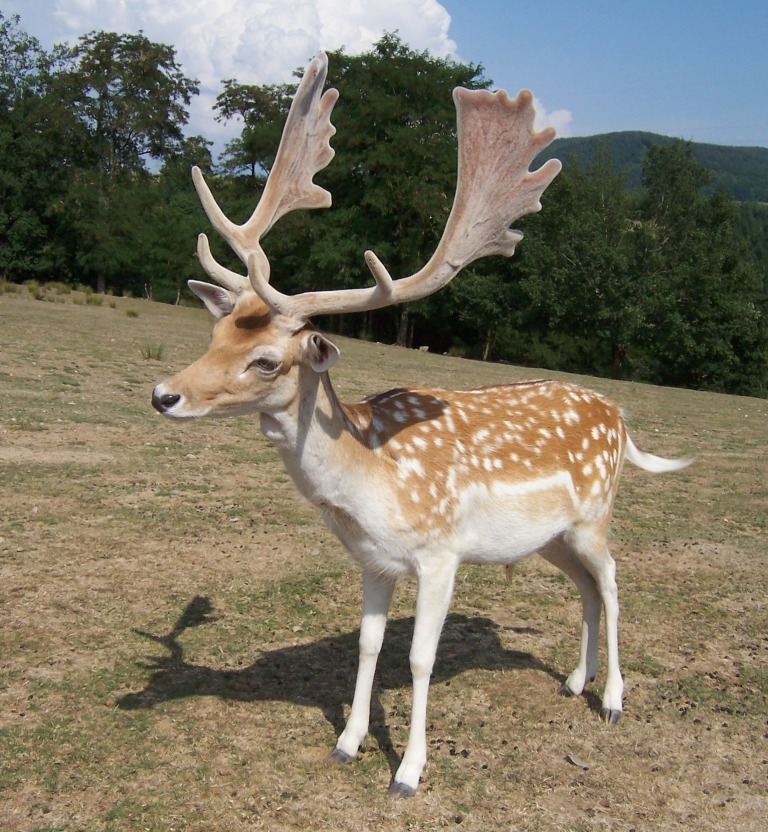
Fallow deer

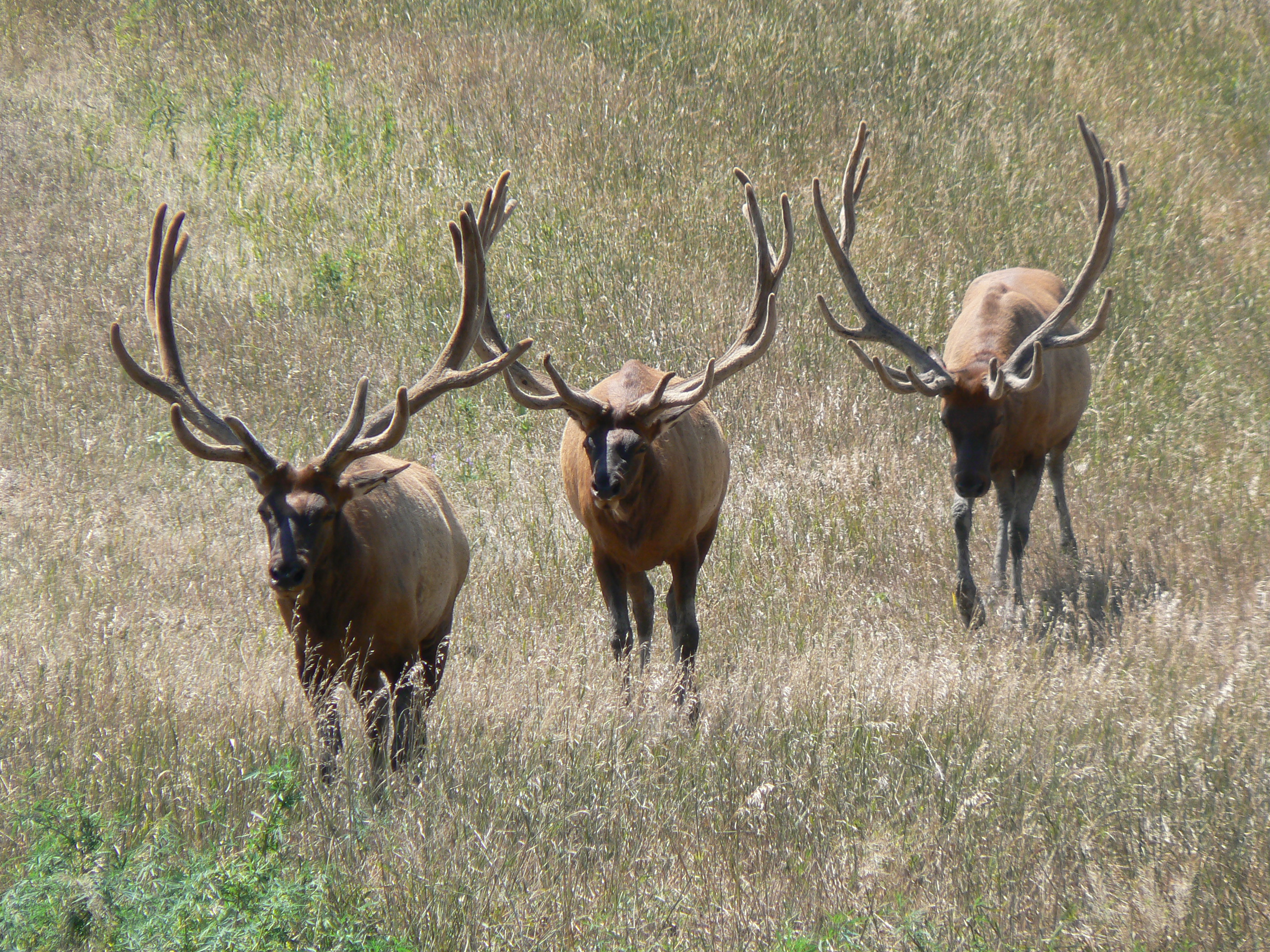
American elk, or wapiti

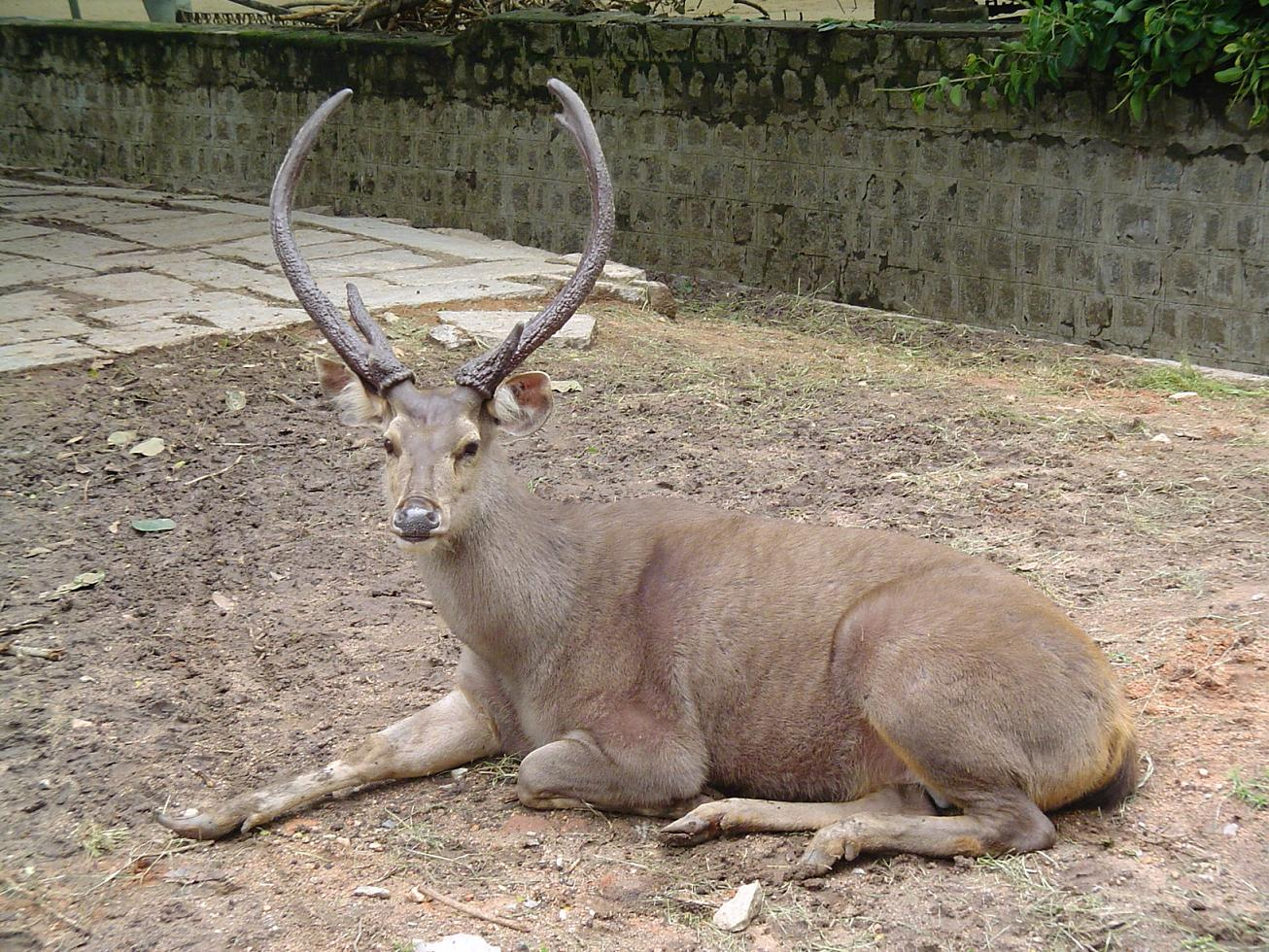
Sambar deer with thick, forked beams for antlers.

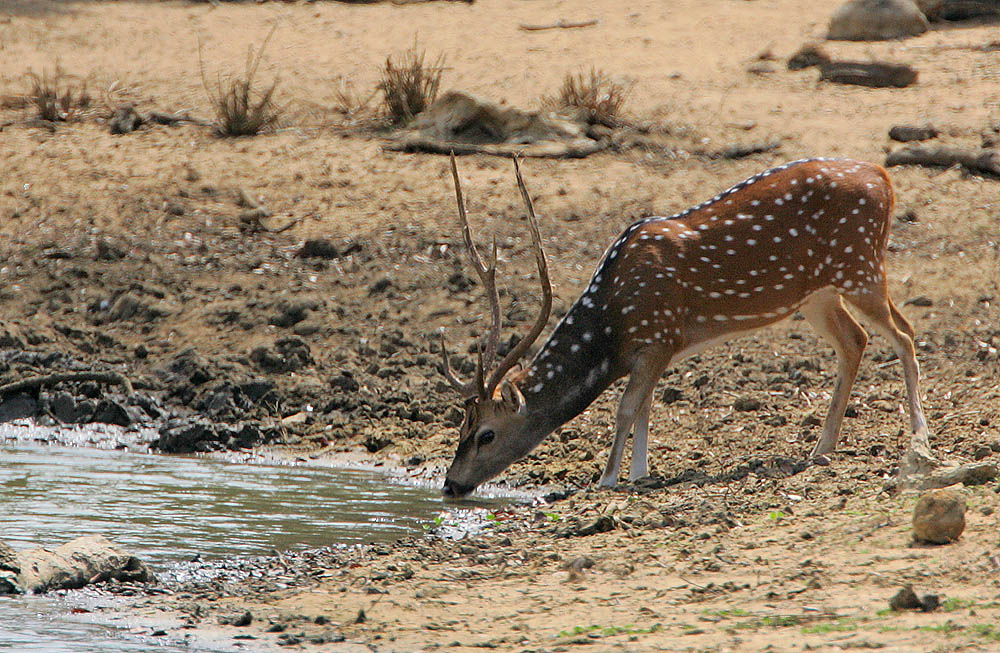
Chital

== Homology and evolution of tines ==
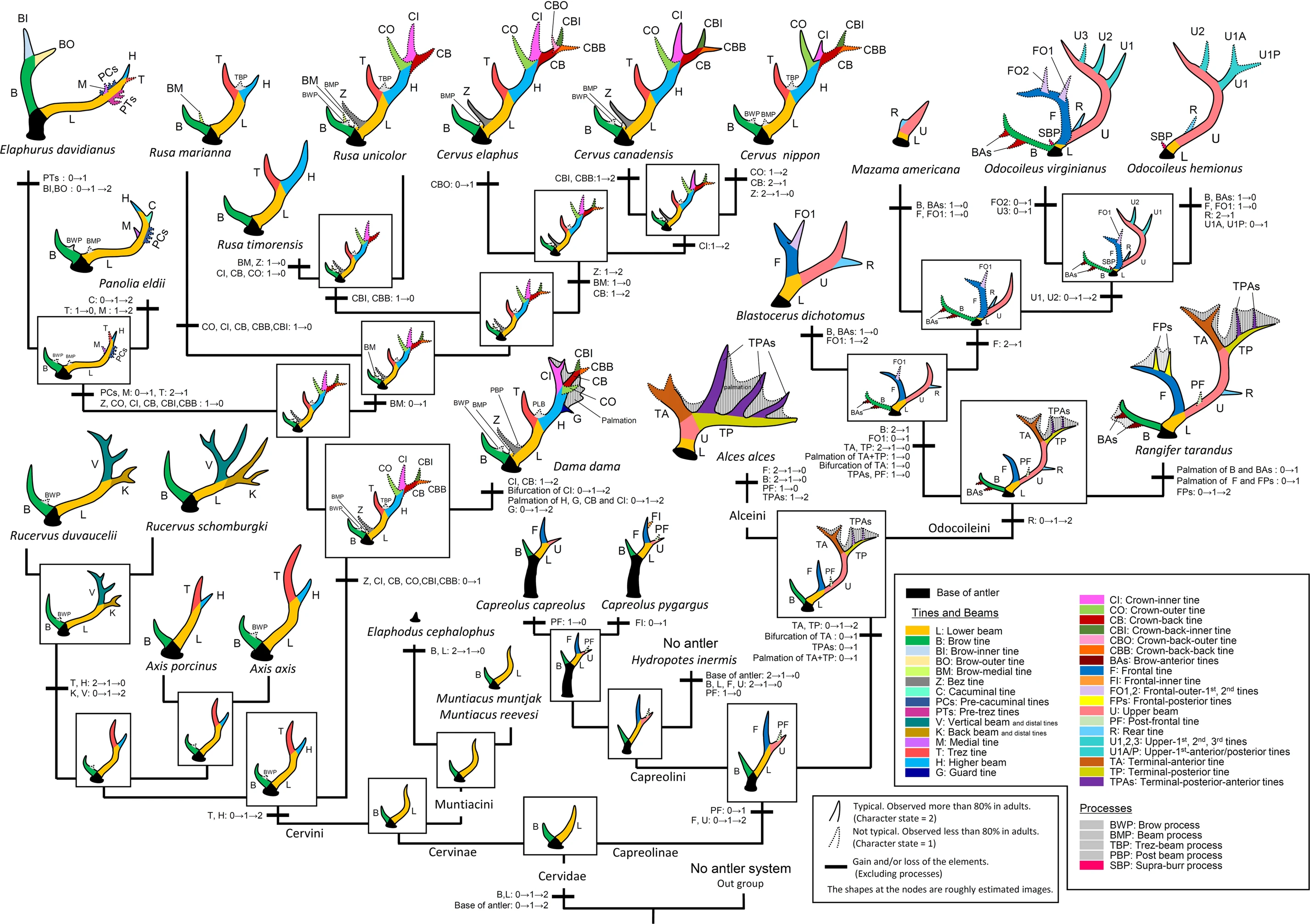
Antler phylogenetics

Antlers originated once in the cervid lineage. The earliest fossil remains of antlers that have been found are dated to the early Miocene, about 17 million years ago. These early antlers were small and had just two forks. As antlers evolved, they lengthened and gained many branches, or tines, becoming more complex. The homology of tines has been discussed since the 1900s and has provided great insight into the evolutionary history of the Cervidae family.

In 2020, a new method to describe the branching structure of antlers was described. The method uses antler grooves, which are formed on the surface of antlers by growth, projecting the branching structure on the burr circumference, and making diagrams. Comparing the positional order among species on the diagram, the tine on the same position is homologous. The study revealed that three-pointed structures of Capreolinae and Cervini are homoplasious, and their subclades gained synapomorphous tines.

== Exploitation by other species ==
=== Ecological role ===
Discarded antlers represent a source of calcium, phosphorus and other minerals and are often gnawed upon by small animals, including squirrels, porcupines, rabbits and mice. This is more common among animals inhabiting regions where the soil is deficient in these minerals. Antlers shed in oak forest inhabited by squirrels are rapidly chewed to pieces by them.

=== Trophy hunting ===
Antlered heads are prized as trophies with larger sets being more highly prized. The first organization to keep records of sizes was Rowland Ward Ltd., a London taxidermy firm, in the early 20th century. For a time only total length or spread was recorded. In the middle of the century, the Boone and Crockett Club and the Safari Club International developed complex scoring systems based on various dimensions and the number of tines or points, and they keep extensive records of high-scoring antlers. Deer bred for hunting on farms are selected based on the size of the antlers.

Hunters have developed terms for antler parts: beam, palm, brow, bez or bay, trez or tray, royal, and surroyal. These are the main shaft, flattened center, first tine, second tine, third tine, fourth tine, and fifth or higher tines, respectively. The second branch is also called an advancer.

In Yorkshire in the United Kingdom roe deer hunting is especially popular due to the large antlers produced there. This is due to the high levels of chalk in Yorkshire. The chalk is high in calcium which is ingested by the deer and helps growth in the antlers.

=== Shed antler hunting ===
Gathering shed antlers or "sheds" attracts dedicated practitioners who refer to it colloquially as shed hunting, or bone picking. In the United States, the middle of December to the middle of February is considered shed hunting season, when deer, elk, and moose begin to shed. The North American Shed Hunting Club, founded in 1991, is an organization for those who take part in this activity.

In the United States in 2017 sheds fetch around US$10 per pound, with larger specimens in good condition attracting higher prices. The most desirable antlers have been found soon after being shed. The value is reduced if they have been damaged by weathering or being gnawed by small animals. A matched pair from the same animal is a very desirable find but often antlers are shed separately and may be separated by several miles. Some enthusiasts for shed hunting use trained dogs to assist them. Most hunters will follow "game trails" (trails where deer frequently run) to find these sheds or they will build a shed trap to collect the loose antlers in the late winter/early spring.

In most US states, the possession of or trade in parts of game animals is subject to some degree of regulation, but the trade in antlers is widely permitted. In the national parks of Canada, the removal of shed antlers is an offense punishable by a maximum fine of C$25,000, as the Canadian government considers antlers to belong to the people of Canada and part of the ecosystems in which they are discarded.

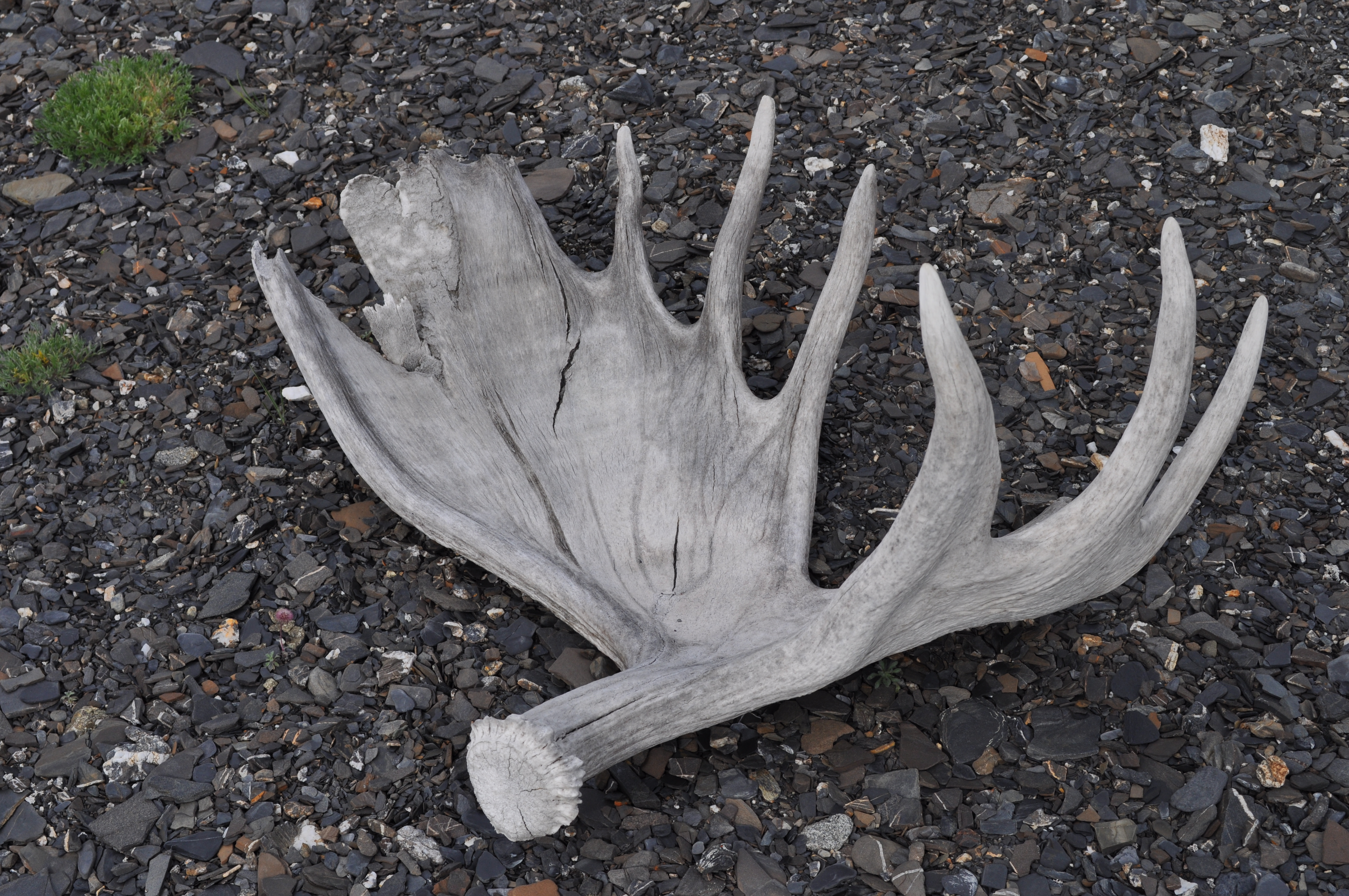
A shed moose antler in Denali National Park and Preserve, Alaska (2010)

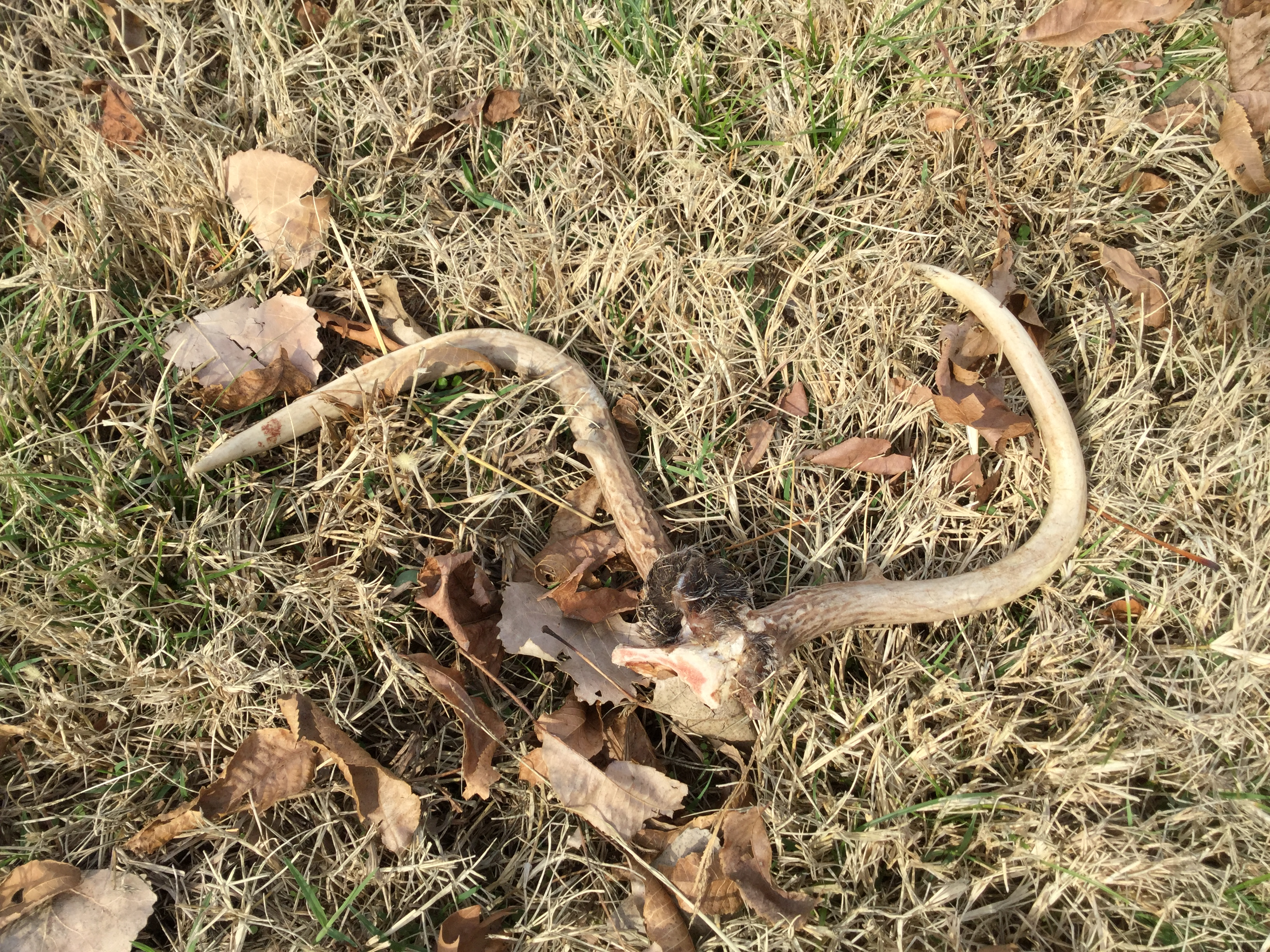
Antlers found shortly after being shed by a whitetail deer in eastern Oklahoma

=== Carving for decorative and tool uses ===
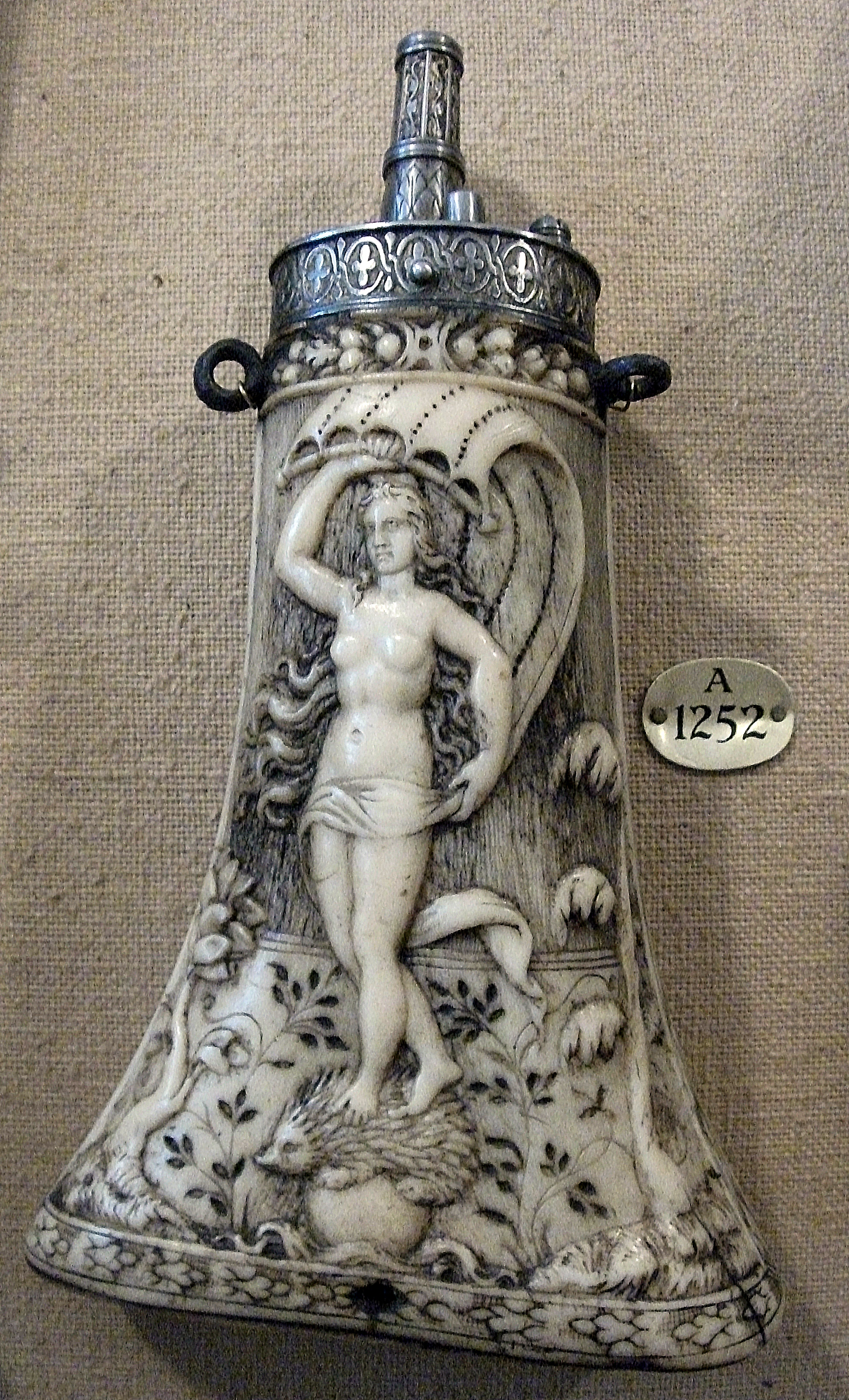
A German powder flask made from a red deer antler, c. 1570. Wallace Collection, London (2010)

Antler has been used through history as a material to make tools, weapons, ornaments, and toys. It was an especially important material in the European Late Paleolithic, used by the Magdalenian culture to make carvings and engraved designs on objects such as the so-called Bâton de commandements and the Bison Licking Insect Bite. In the Viking Age and medieval period, it formed an important raw material in the craft of comb-making. In later periods, antler—used as a cheap substitute for ivory—was a material especially associated with equipment for hunting, such as saddles and horse harness, guns and daggers, powder flasks, as well as buttons and the like. The decorative display of wall-mounted pairs of antlers has been popular since medieval times at least.

The Netsilik, an Inuit group, made bows and arrows using antlers, reinforced with strands of animal tendons braided to form a cable-backed bow. Several Indigenous American tribes also used antler to make bows, gluing tendons to the bow instead of tying them as cables. An antler bow, made in the early 19th century, is on display at Brooklyn Museum. Its manufacture is attributed to the Yankton Sioux.

Through history large deer antler from a suitable species (e.g. red deer) were often cut down to its shaft and its lowest tine and used as a one-pointed pickax.

=== Ceremonial roles ===
Antler headdresses were worn by shamans and other spiritual figures in various cultures, and for dances; 21 antler "frontlets" apparently for wearing on the head, and over 10,000 years old, have been excavated at the English Mesolithic site of Starr Carr. Antlers are still worn in traditional dances such as Yaqui deer dances and carried in the Abbots Bromley Horn Dance.

=== Dietary usage ===
In the velvet antler stage, antlers of elk and deer have been used in Asia as a dietary supplement or alternative medicinal substance for more than 2,000 years. Recently, deer antler extract has become popular among Western athletes and body builders because the extract, with its trace amounts of IGF-1, is believed to help build and repair muscle tissue; however, one double-blind study did not find evidence of intended effects.

Elk, deer, and moose antlers have also become popular forms of dog chews that owners purchase for their pet canines.

=== Shed hunting with dogs ===
Dogs are sometimes used to find shed antlers. The North American Shed Hunting Dog Association (NASHDA) has resources for people who want to train their dogs to find shed antlers and hold shed dog hunting events.
