= Kostroma Moose Farm =

Experimental farm in Kostroma Oblast, Russia

Coordinates: 57°40′32″N 41°12′24″E

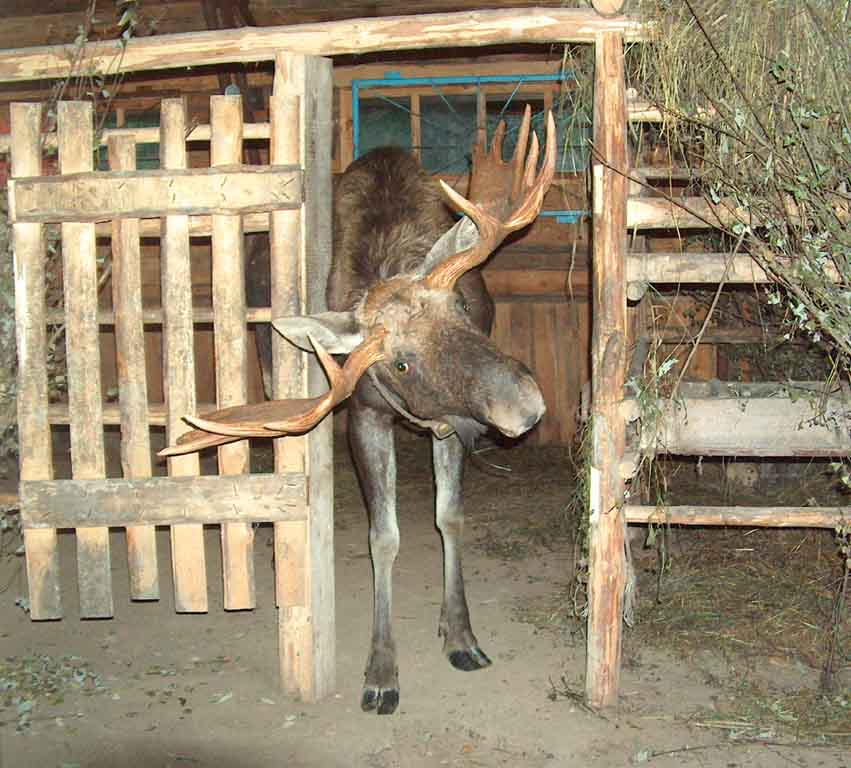
This bull moose finds a gate at Kostroma Moose Farm rather narrow for his antlers.

Kostroma Moose Farm (Russian: Костромска́я лосефе́рма) is an experimental farm in Kostroma Oblast, Russia, where a herd of moose is kept, primarily for milk production; the farm supplies moose's milk to a nearby sanitorium. It is located near the village of Sumarokovo in Krasnoselsky District of Kostroma Oblast, some 25 km east of the city of Kostroma.

== Early history of the moose domestication ==
As early as 1869, the Russian zoologist and explorer Alexander von Middendorff wrote to the Tsar's Government:

Even the civilized Europe these days has failed to domesticate the moose, the animal that doubtlessly can be of great utility. Our government ought to apply all possible efforts toward the domestication of this animal. This is doable. The reward would be great, and so would be the glory.

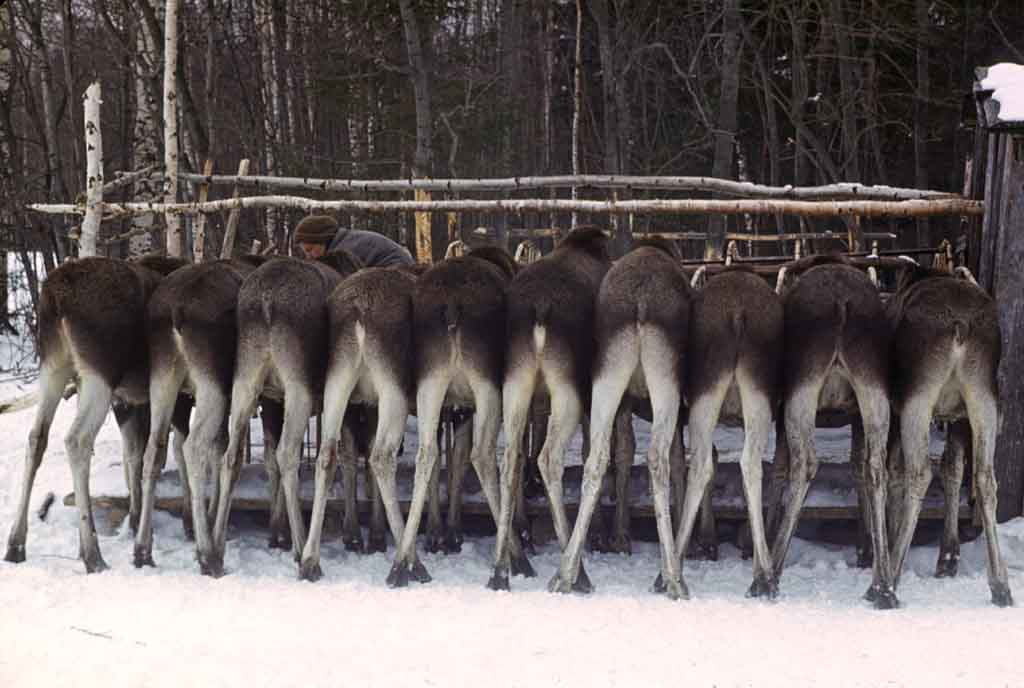
Young moose eating steamed oats at the winter camp

The idea of the moose domestication did not get much traction in Tsarist Russia. However, it reappeared in the 1930s’ Soviet Union; it was suggested at the time that moose cavalry could be efficiently used even in the deep snow. In 1934, the Soviet Government's Nature Reserve Committee ordered creation of moose reserves (zapovedniks) and moose breeding centers (лосиные питомники). Experimental work, initiated by Petr Alexandrovich Manteufel (Петр Александрович Мантейфель), took place at a number of locations: in Yakutia, at the Serpukhov Experimental Game Farm, and in the Buzuluksy Bor Nature Reserve (Бузулукский бор) in Orenburg Region. This experimental work included mounting pistols, spikes, and shields to the antlers of a moose, as well delegating moose labor to tasks of hauling cannons and long range artillery.

However, the work was not finished in time for World War II, and when the war came, the entire idea of cavalry as a combat force was swept away.

After the war, the idea of domesticating the moose was pursued again, with the focus on agricultural use. It was thought that the moose, whose very name means twig eater in an Algonquian language, could provide an ideal way of improving the utilization of the biomass production potential of the taiga of northern and eastern Russia, which are not particularly suitable for either food crop planting or conventional animal husbandry. If the moose could be farmed, it could be provided with feed practically for free, utilizing the by-products of timber harvesting: tree branches and bark.

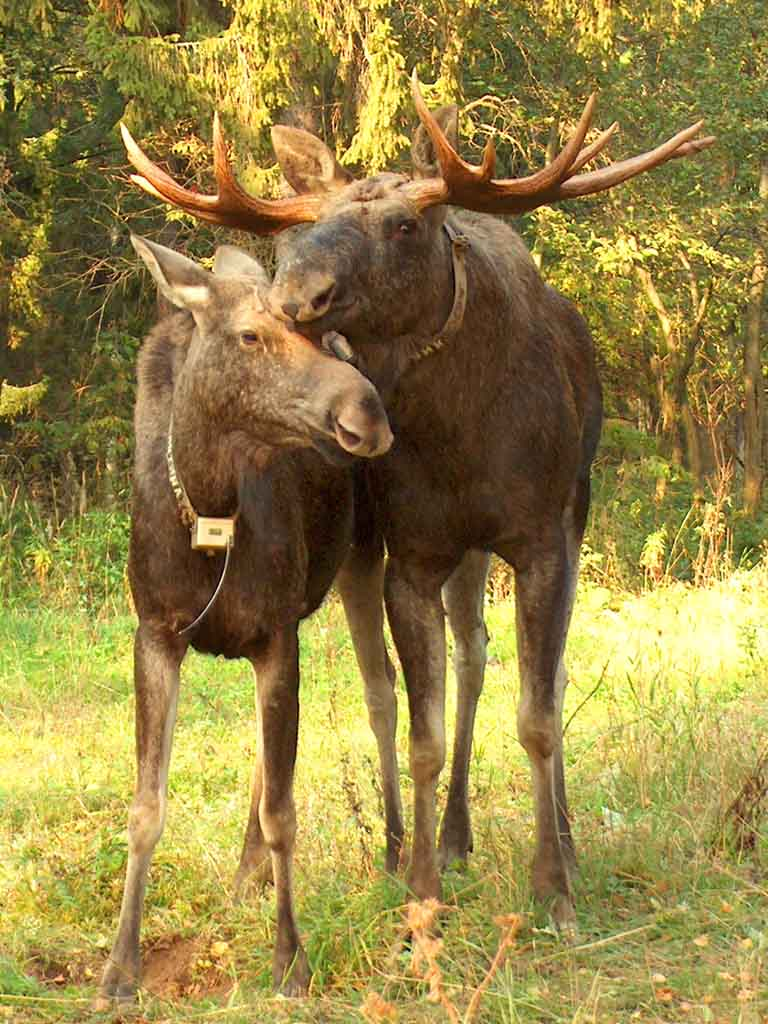
To study the behavior of the moose, each animal at Kostroma Moose Farm is equipped with a radio transmitter.

The first experimental moose farm, led by Yevgeny Knorre, was launched in 1949 by the staff of the Pechora-Ilych Nature Reserve, outside of the settlement of Yaksha in the Komi Republic. Rare photos from that period, one of a moose being ridden and one of a moose pulling a sledge, were included in the 1969 paper "Behavioural changes in elk in the process of its domestication"

Research quickly showed that being penned in stalls is not conducive to moose biology; the animals' health would suffer in such conditions, possibly because of the lack of certain nutrients that the free-ranging animals can find in wild plants. Moreover, it would be very expensive to supply captive moose with suitable fodder, as the moose are picky eaters and will not eat branches thicker than some 10 mm (0.4 in) or so.

== Later history ==
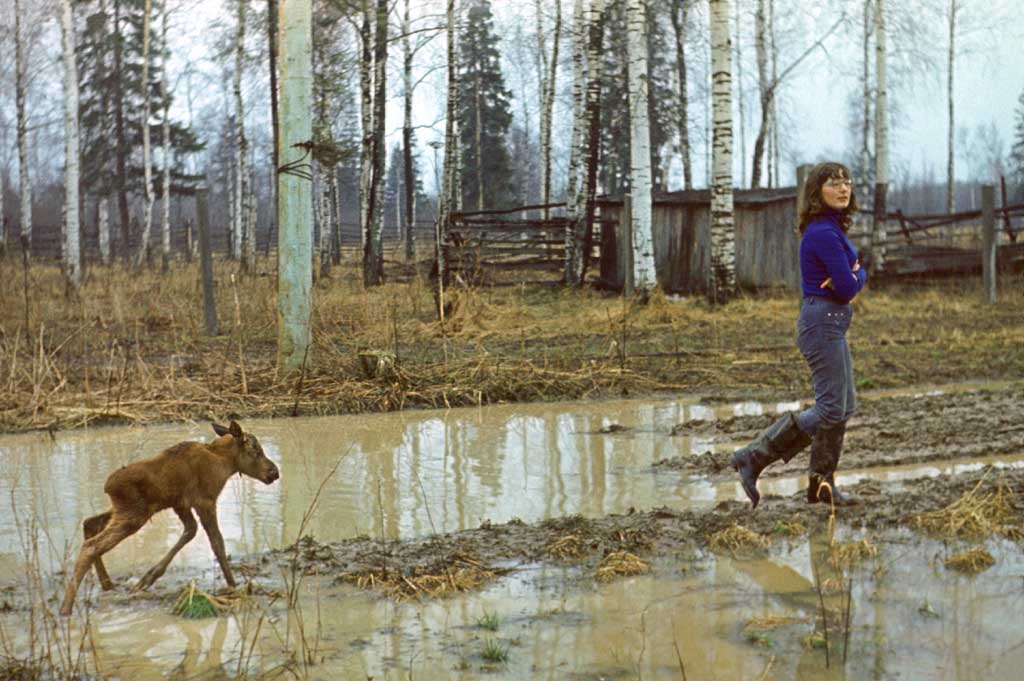
A bottle-fed baby moose develops attachment to its caregiver.

The more feasible technique, adopted first at Yaksha and later at Kostroma Moose Farm can be called "moose ranching". It is somewhat similar to the semi-domesticated reindeer husbandry pursued by the people of the tundra, or the sheep herding of the steppes.

During a large part of the year, the animals are allowed to roam free throughout the forest. They usually do not go too far, however, because they know the farm (or the winter camp, as the case may be) as the place to get their favorite foods and as a safe place to give birth to their young.

The Kostroma moose give birth to their young in April or May. A farm-born moose calf is taken from its mother within 2–3 hours after birth and is raised by people. It is first bottle-fed with a milk substitute, and later fed from a bucket. The resulting imprinting effect makes the growing animal attached to people; the steamed oats will remain one of its favorite foods for the rest of its life.

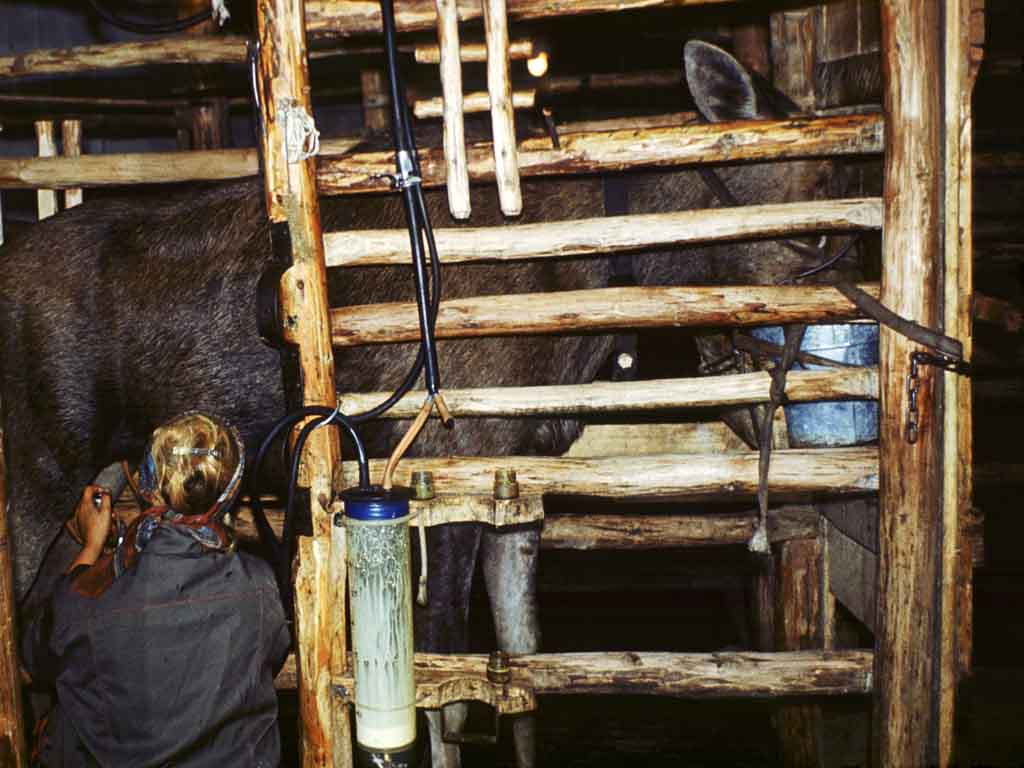
Machine milking.

In the meantime, the mother moose is being milked by the farm's milkmaids; due to a similar imprinting mechanism, the cow moose will soon recognize them as her "substitute children". At this point, it can be released to the forest; it will come back to the farm every day to be milked during the rest of her lactation period (typically, until September or October).

In winter, the animals spend much time at the woodlots in the nearby forests where trees are being cut, feeding on the byproducts of timber operations. The abundant supply of forest foods, plus daily rations of oats and salted water keep them around the woodlot even without the fence.

It was found early in the course of the moose domestication research that some animals are more attached to the farm than others. Therefore, it is hoped that a multi-generational selection program will result in breeding a domesticated variety of the moose. However, in the conditions of the existing moose farms the prospects of artificial selection are made somewhat difficult by the fact that in the free-range conditions farm moose cows often mate with wild moose bulls.

== The Kostroma Farm ==
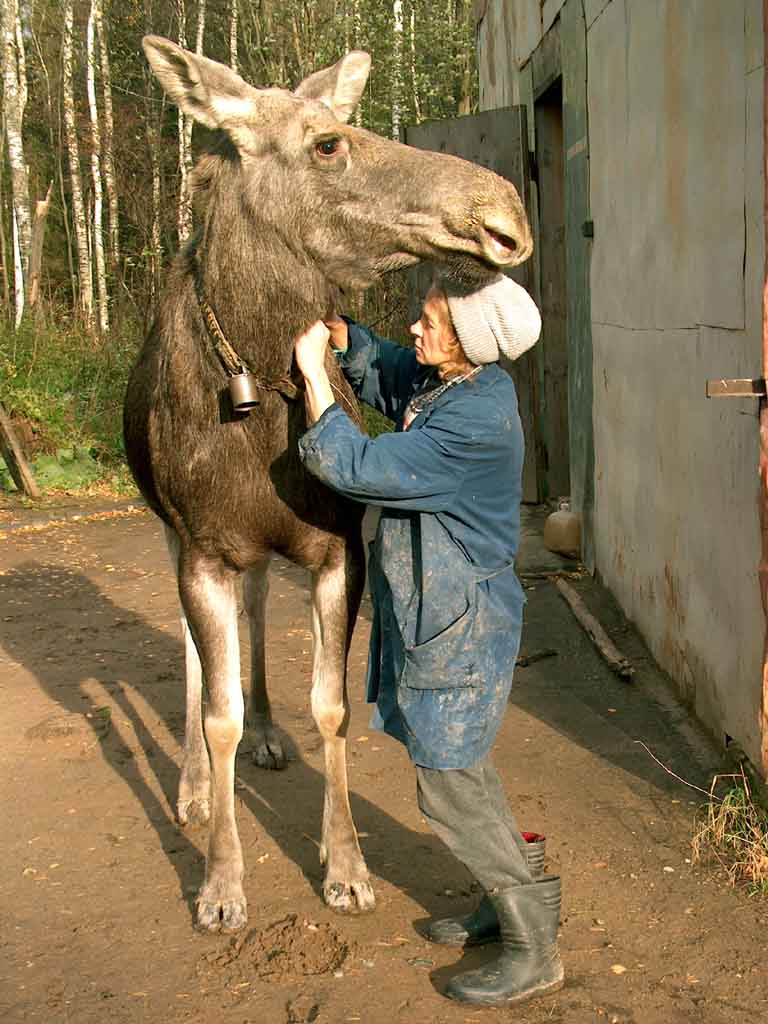
A milkmaid with her favorite moose cow.

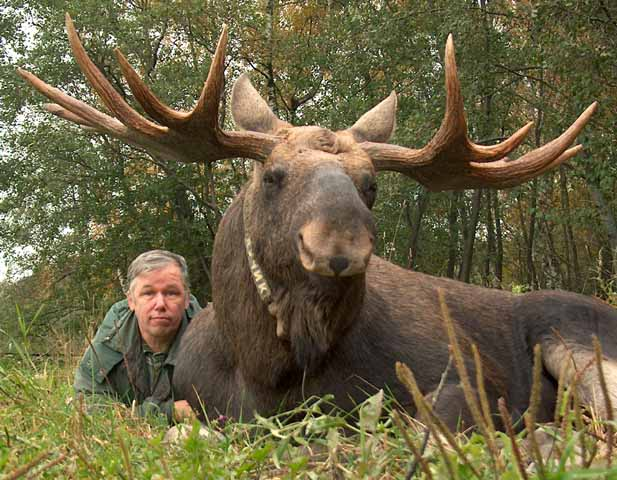
Dr. Minaev, whose Cand. Sci. dissertation has to do with using radio monitoring to study the behavior of the moose in the process of domestication, and Luchik the Moose, wearing a collar with a radio transmitter (photo by Alexander Minaev)

Kostroma Moose Farm, established in 1963 under the aegis of Kostroma Oblast Agricultural Research Station (Костромская государственная областная сельскохозяйственная опытная станция), where the free-range moose ranching techniques described above are used. A Moose Husbandry Laboratory was created at the research station to coordinate research work conducted at the farm, both by the Kostroma zoologists and by researchers from Moscow and elsewhere.

In 1985 the Moose Husbandry Laboratory was transferred from the Kostroma Agriculture Research Station to the Kostroma Forestry Research Station, and due to budgetary cuts was closed altogether in 1992. Also in 1985 the moose farm was transferred to the Kostroma Forestry Enterprise (Костромской лесхоз). In these conditions the farm continued to operate, but more like a petting zoo than a research facility.

Resumption of the research work on the farm came only after January 2002 when the Moose Husbandry Laboratory was re-created, under the Kostroma Agricultural Research Institute and when in 2005 the Kostroma Moose Farm was transferred from the forestry enterprise to the Kostroma Oblast Natural Resources Committee.

The main lines of farm's business are:

- Milk production. The farm's livestock includes around 10-15 milk-producing moose cows. The milk, reported to be rich in vitamins and microelements and to be useful for the treatment of peptic ulcers, radiation lesions and some other conditions is supplied to the nearby Ivan Susanin Sanatorium.
- Harvesting antler velvet. A bull moose grows a new pair of antlers every summer. Similar to the maral farms in New Zealand and Siberia, moose antlers can be harvested while they are still soft and covered with velvet, which is used for the manufacture of certain supplements and alternative medicines.
- Tourist attraction / novelty value. Although, as at any responsible animal husbandry establishment, access to the farm is strictly controlled by the management, organized tourist groups can visit the facility on tours arranged through the Kostroma Tourism Bureau.
- Potentially, sales of farm-raised young animals to zoos and safari parks, wildlife reintroduction projects in areas that have lost their Alces populations, or to those who want to start new dairy moose farms.

Researchers involved with the project emphasize that although much has been learned about the moose biology, and the techniques for semi-domesticated moose husbandry have been developed, raising animals like this is a not an easy affair. In the interests of the animals themselves, one should not try to enter this business without appropriate expertise, good capitalization, and access to a suitable habitat.

In particular, one is advised not to try to start a moose farm for meat production: the meat output will not cover the costs of production (which could be ten times as high as those of beef production), and, besides, free-range moose are not stupid, and they will not be coming back to the farm where their kin are being slaughtered. A couple of operators in Yaroslavl and Nizhny Novgorod Oblasts went out of business trying to do this.

The farm maintains the database of all animals that have ever been brought to the farm or born there. As of 2006, it listed 842 moose that have lived on the farm during its history.

Over the first forty years of operation (1963–2003), 770 animals ended their stay at the farm in the following ways:

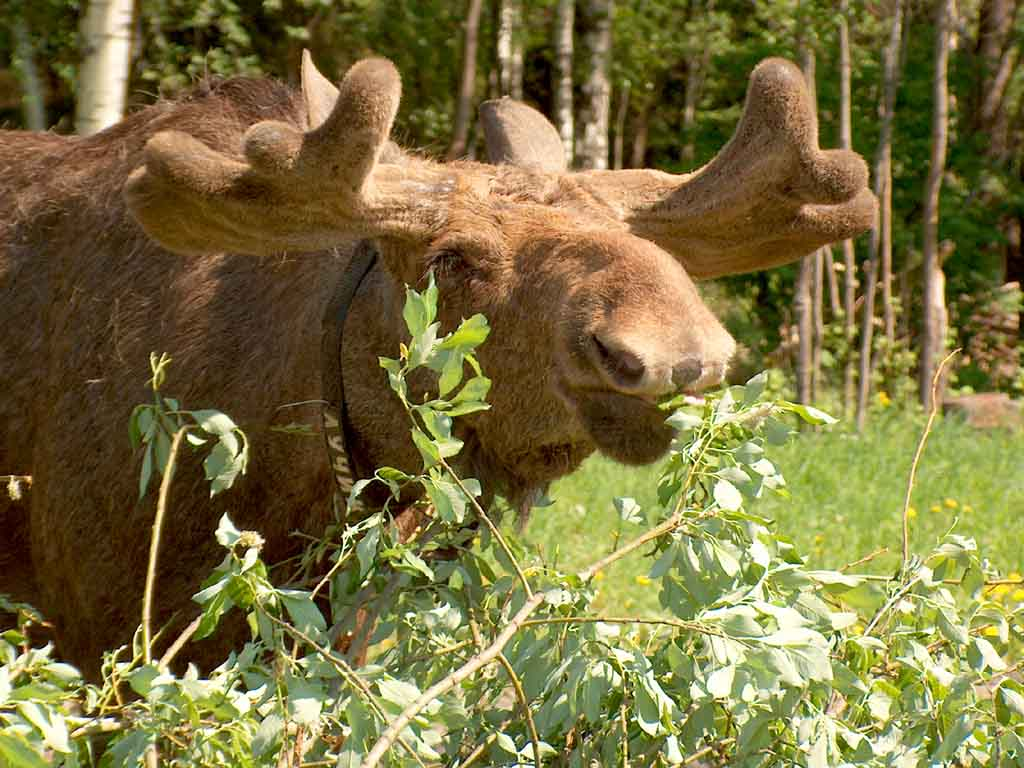
Immature moose antlers, covered with antler velvet, can be harvested every summer.

Disposition	Females	Males	Total
Died or disappeared (while under 1 year of age)	118	139	257
Disappeared or escaped (after 1 year of age)	93	66	159
Killed by poachers	28	4	32
Died of a disease or accident	23	12	35
Died of natural causes	11	0	11
Sold (after 1 year of age)	10	14	24
Slaughtered (after 1 year of age)	4	44	48
Sold (under 1 year of age)	51	66	117
Slaughtered (under 1 year of age)	8	46	54
Still living on the farm in 2003	29	4	33
Total over 1963-2003	375	395	770

Over the years, the herd size varied from 4 (in 1965) to 67 (in 1978).

Over the period from 1972 to 1985 (when the milk production statistics are available), the number of milked moose cows on the farm increased from 3 to 16, the average number over the period being 11. Over those 13 years, 23,864 liters (around 6,000 gallons) of the milk had been produced.
