= Moose cavalry =

Military Unit

Moose

Moose cavalry are military units of cavalrymen mounted on moose (AKA Eurasian elk, Alces alces alces) rather than the more usual horses. Some sources state that in 17th-century Sweden Charles XI trialled the use of moose as a replacement for horses, which had to be imported, but this is disputed. The use of moose cavalry by the Soviets in the Winter War of 1939 and 1940 is also reported but seems to stem from a 2010 Popular Mechanics April Fools' Day article.

== Sweden ==
The moose (Eurasian elk, Alces alces alces) had been used in Sweden to draw the sleighs of royal couriers since at least the reign of Charles IX. They proved effective in this role, able to travel around 230 miles (370 km) in a day. Some sources state that as a development of this role, Charles XI (1660–1697) trialled the use of moose cavalry. The intention was apparently to replace the horses of one of his cavalry regiments with moose, to avoid the need to import horses as was the contemporary practice. It is said to have been thought that the animals would cause fear in the horses of enemy cavalry, allowing formations to be broken without the need for artillery or musketry. The idea was allegedly presented to the Royal Swedish Academy of Sciences in Stockholm.

It is said that during training the moose was too fearful to allow itself to be ridden into battle and took fright at the sound of gunfire. They were also said to be of too peaceful in nature for the purpose. Moose were also more susceptible to disease than horses and there was difficulty in feeding the animals which were used to foraging across large areas rather than being fed on fodder in pasture.

Swedish historian Dick Harrison has stated that he has found no evidence for the use of moose cavalry in contemporary sources. The only evidence comes from 19th century rumors about a past moose cavalry. (Though he does note that there were serious attempts to de novo domesticate moose, at least in the 19th century.)

== Russian April Fools' Day hoax ==
Some news outlets have reported that Joseph Stalin attempted to introduce the moose as a replacement for horses in Soviet cavalry regiments based in the northern parts of the country during the 1930s. The story is thought to have been popularised by a 2010 April Fools' Day article published in the Russian language edition of Popular Mechanics.

The article claimed that 1,500 moose cavalrymen were trained for service in the Winter War of 1939 and 1940. Machine guns were supposedly mounted to the antlers of the moose. Among the more outlandish claims was that the start of the war was postponed to avoid clashing with the moose mating season and that the animals could distinguish between the Russian and Finnish languages at a distance of over a kilometre. The article included several photographs supposedly showing members of the moose cavalry unit. These were in fact posed by members of Popular Mechanics' publishing house dressed in reproduction Red Army uniforms with the moose superimposed in post-processing. A graphics artist, Vitas Chernyauskas, mocked-up the front cover of an instruction manual for the unit, based on contemporary Soviet documents and this was also included in the article.

The hoax article was widely reproduced in Russian media over the following years, often without the April Fools' Day disclaimer carried in the original article. Posters on military history forums often claimed to have seen, or even read, copies of the fictional instruction manual. The coverage in newspapers, satirical sites and social media meant that the story gained a measure of credence as a historical fact. Moose were successfully domesticated in Soviet Russia but as livestock, at Pechoro-Ilychkaya from 1949 and Kostroma Moose Farm from 1965.

In 2017, a war museum in Lakhdenpokhya, Karelia, Russia showcased the doctored photographs from the Popular Mechanics article in an exhibition as a recent discovery of historic documents. The exhibition claimed that the "war moose" had been trained by the Soviet army for four years.

The story, sourced from the museum exhibition, was covered by the Finnish national public broadcaster Yle in a television broadcast and as an online news article in June 2017. The story was also covered by the tabloid newspaper Iltalehti. Yle was informed of the errors in the story by a member of the public but only issued a correction one month later. As a consequence they were investigated by the Finnish media regulator the Council for Mass Media in Finland for failures in fact-checking and responding to the error report. The erroneous story is still available on the Yle website, including the doctored images from Popular Mechanics, but with a disclaimer and link to the Council for Mass Media's findings. Iltalehti also published amendments to their online article and a link to the Council for Mass Media.

There is some information relating to Soviet moose cavalry trials that pre-dates the 2010 hoax. In 2004 the manager of the Kostroma Moose Farm claimed that the trials were carried out in the 1930s. He claimed that "Stalin thought elk could replace horses in cavalry regiments based in the north ... but this did not work out, and the idea was abandoned". The National Archives of Finland state that the Red Army did use limited numbers of moose during the Second World War, though as pack or draft animals, not as mounts.

== See also ==
- Camel cavalry
