= Moose cheese =

Moose milk product

- Country of origin: Sweden
- Region: Bjurholm Municipality
- Town: Bjurholm, at the Älgens Hus farm
- Source of milk: Moose
- Fat content: 12%
- Protein content: 12%

Moose cheese is cheese made from moose milk. Varieties of moose cheese are produced in Sweden by Christer and Ulla Johansson at their location called "Moose House" or "Elk House". Three varieties of moose cheese are produced.

== Overview ==
The Elk House (Älgens Hus) farm in Bjurholm, Sweden, run by Christer and Ulla Johansson, is one of the world's only producers of moose cheese. It has three milk-producing moose, whose milk yields roughly 300 kilograms of cheese per year; the cheese sells for about US$1,000 per kilogram (approximately US$455 per pound).

Three varieties of cheese are produced: a rind-style, a blue and a feta-style.

The cheese is served at the Älgens Hus' restaurant, located in Sweden.

Moose cheese is also produced by GamEat from Russia by cheese maker Alexander Fursin.

== See also ==
- List of cheeses
