= Moose milk =

Milk produced by female mooses

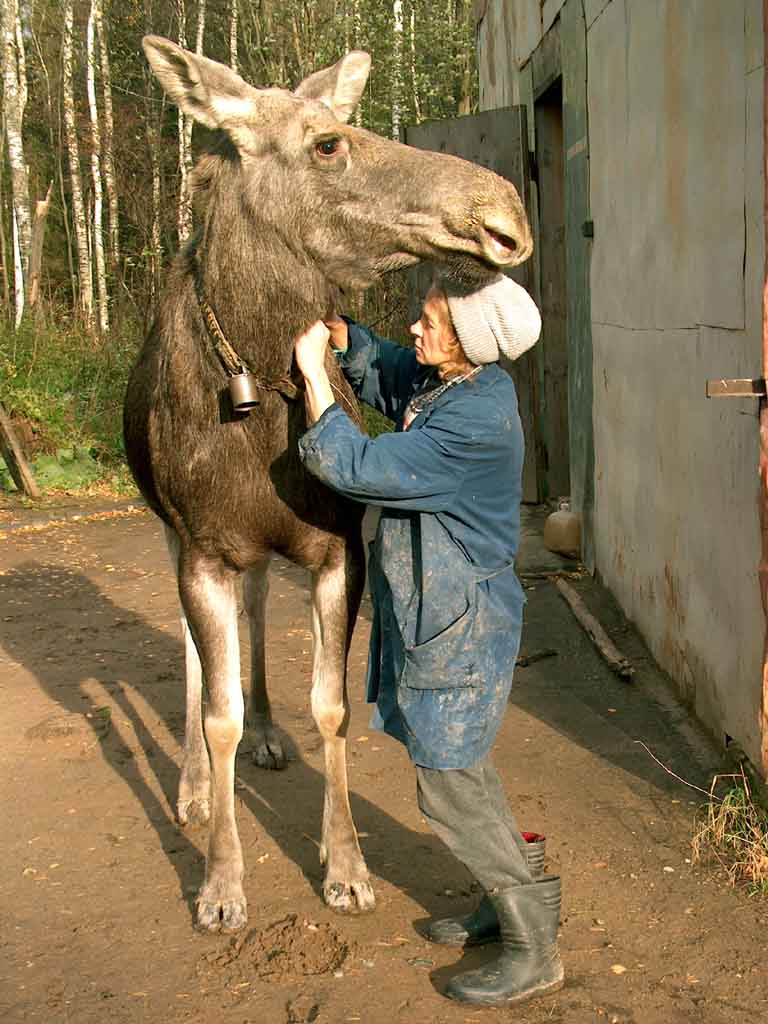
A milkmaid at the Kostroma Moose Farm in Kostroma Oblast, Russia prepares to milk a moose

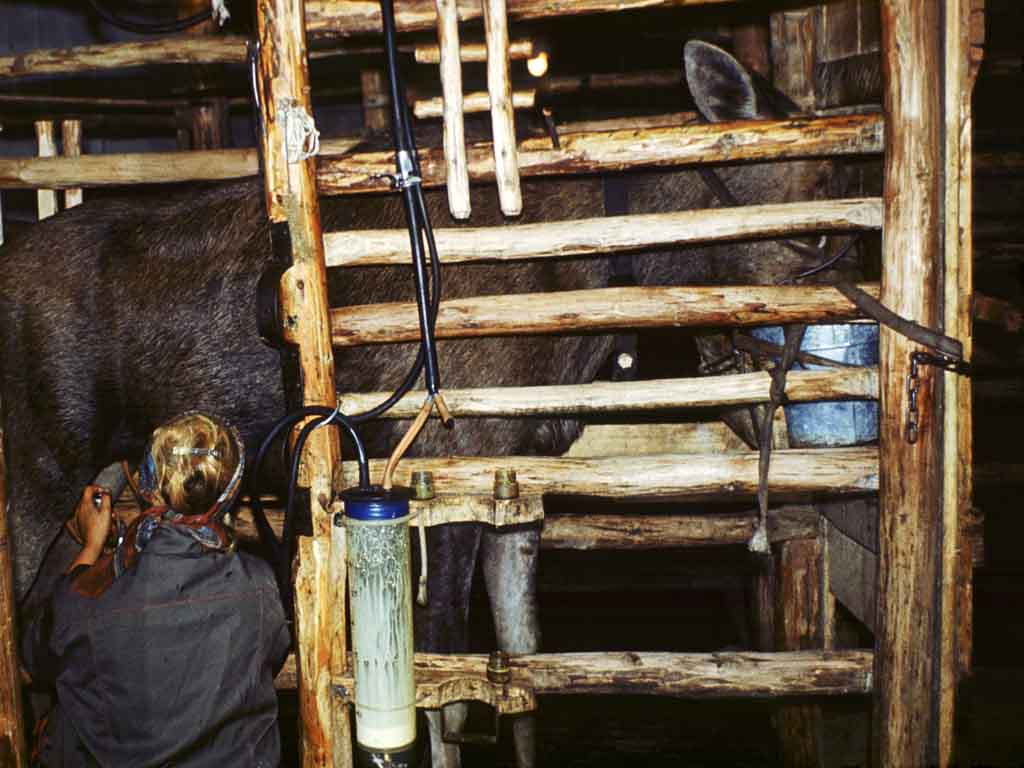
Collecting moose milk at Kostroma Moose Farm in Russia

Moose milk, also known as elk milk, refers to milk produced by moose (Alces alces). Though it is most commonly consumed by moose calves, its production has also been commercialised in Russia and Sweden.

== Nutritional content ==
Moose milk is high in butterfat (10%) and solids (21.5%), according to data collected on Russian moose; research into American moose milk is in a less advanced state than in Russia, but appears to indicate that American moose have even higher concentrations of solids in their milk. Moose lactate between June and August; conditional on a good supply of high-quality forage, nutrient and fat concentrations in the milk typically increase during the first twenty-five days of lactation, which are considered the peak period; nutrients, fat, and mineral element concentrations decrease for the remainder of the lactation period. However, compared to cow milk, moose milk still has much higher levels of aluminium, iron, selenium, and zinc.

== Farming and sale ==
Moose milk is commercially farmed in Russia; one sanitorium, the Ivan Susanin Sanitorium, even serves moose milk to residents in the belief that it helps them recover from disease or manage chronic illness more effectively. Some Russian researchers have recommended that moose milk could be used for the prevention of gastroenterological diseases in children, due to its lysozyme activity.

The Elk House (Älgens Hus) farm in Bjurholm, Sweden, run by Christer and Ulla Johansson is believed to be the world's only producer of moose cheese. As of 2007, it had three milk-producing moose, whose milk yielded roughly 300 kilograms (660 lb) of cheese per year, which sold for about $1,000 (equivalent to $1,516 in 2024) per kilogram. A disturbed moose cow's milk dries up, so it can take up to 2 hours of milking in silence to get the full 2-litre (0.53 US gal) yield. Russian moose researcher Alexander Minaev had also previously tried to make moose cheese, but he stated that, due to the milk's high protein content, the cheese became hard far too quickly. As of 2007, he was not aware of any attempts to make moose ice cream.

== See also ==
- Donkey's milk
- Camel milk
- Goat milk
- Sheep milk
- Cow milk
- List of dairy products
