= Sumarokovo =

Sumarokovo Сумароково
- Village
- Location within Vladimir Oblast Location within Russia
- Coordinates: 56°10′N 42°31′E
- Country: Russia
- Region: Vladimir Oblast
- District: Gorokhovetsky District
- Time zone: UTC+3:00

Sumarokovo (Russian: Сумароково) is a rural locality (a village) in Kupriyanovskoye Rural Settlement, Gorokhovetsky District, Vladimir Oblast, Russia. The population was 1 as of 2010.

== Geography ==
Sumarokovo is located on the Klyazma River, 17 km west of Gorokhovets (the district's administrative centre) by road. Khabalevo is the nearest rural locality.
