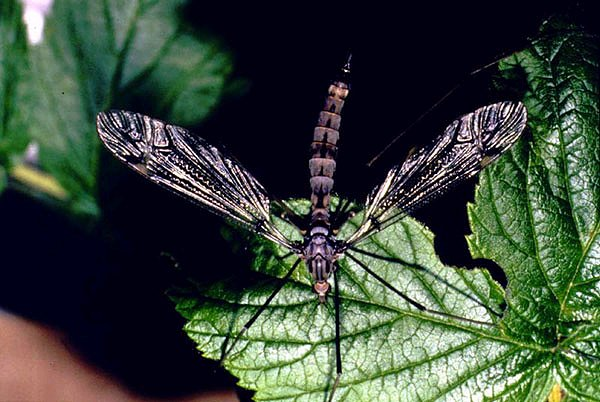

Scientific classification
- Domain: Eukaryota
- Kingdom: Animalia
- Phylum: Arthropoda
- Class: Insecta
- Order: Diptera
- Suborder: Eudiptera

Infraorder
- Deuterophlebiomorpha; Tipulomorpha; Culicomorpha; Bibionomorpha; Blephariceromorpha; Axymyiomorpha; Ptychopteromorpha

= Eudiptera =

Suborder of flies

Eudiptera is a suborder of Diptera under an alternative subordinal classification based largely on fossil taxa; it has not gained wide acceptance among non-paleontological dipterists and is presented here for comparative purposes only. The suborder is the sister group of Archidiptera (another group also largely based on fossil taxa).

All of the taxa included in Eudiptera are also members of the Nematocera, and the latter is the preferred grouping; both are paraphyletic.
