= Archidiptera =

Scientific classification
- Kingdom: Animalia
- Phylum: Arthropoda
- Class: Insecta
- Order: Diptera
- Suborder: Archidiptera

Infraorder
- Infraorder Nymphomyiomorpha; Nymphomyiidae; Infraorder Dictyodipteromorpha extinct Superfamily Dictyodipteridea; Dictyodipteridae - (Upper Triassic); Superfamily Hyperpolyneuridea; Hyperpolyneuridae - (Upper Triassic); Superfamily Dyspolyneuridea; Dyspolyneuridae - (Upper Triassic); Infraorder Diplopolyneuromorpha extinct Diplopolyneuridae - (Upper Triassic)

Alternative classification of flies

Archidiptera is a suborder of Diptera under an alternative classification based largely on fossil taxa; it has not gained wide acceptance among non-paleontological dipterists. This is a sister group of Eudiptera (another suborder also based largely on fossil taxa).

Its sole living representative, the family Nymphomyiidae, is normally considered a member of the Blephariceromorpha within the Nematocera.
