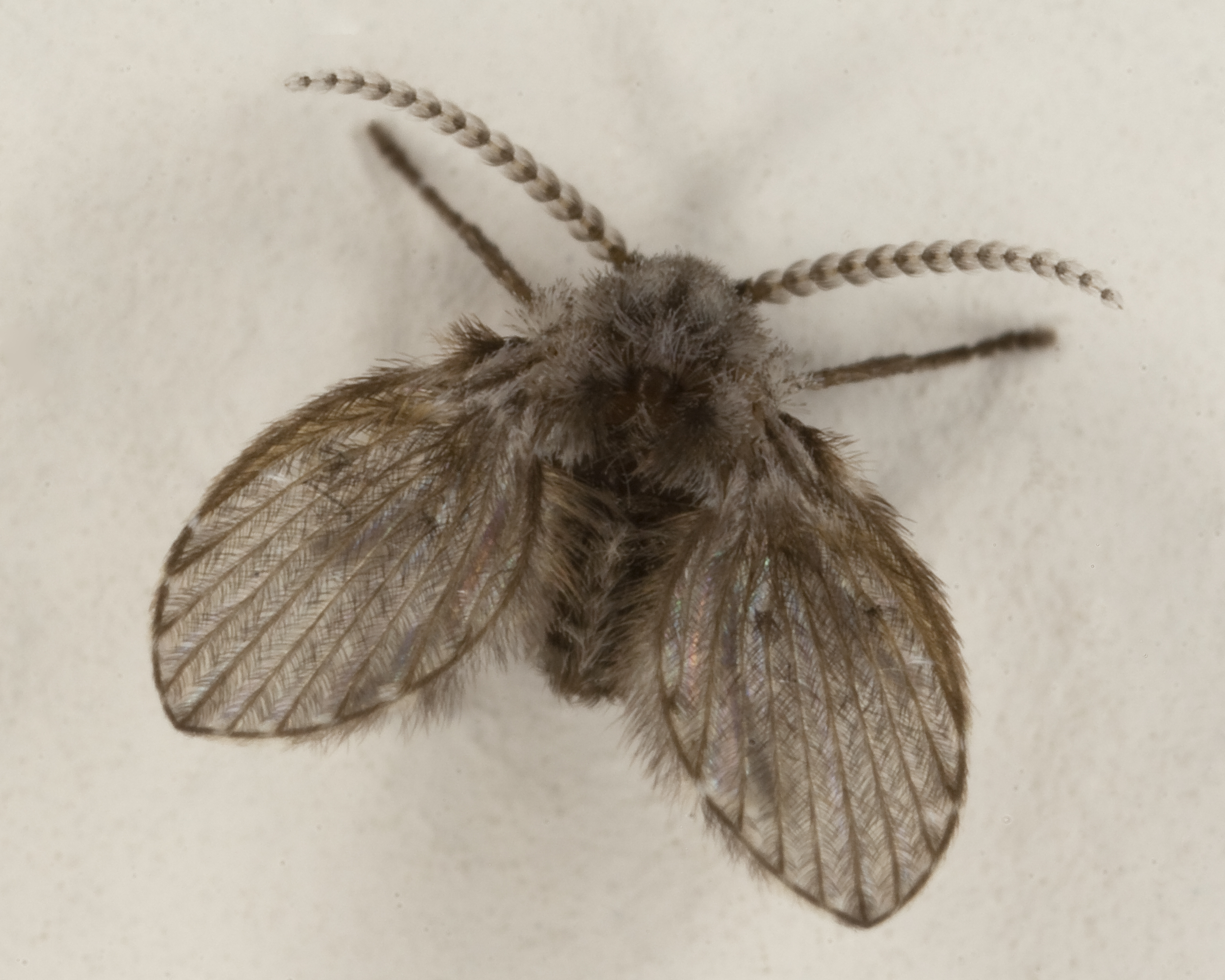
- Clogmia albipunctata family Psychodidae

Scientific classification
- Kingdom: Animalia
- Phylum: Arthropoda
- Clade: Pancrustacea
- Class: Insecta
- Order: Diptera
- Suborder: Nematocera
- Infraorder: Psychodomorpha; Hennig, 1968

Families
- Blephariceridae; Psychodidae; Tanyderidae; Scatopsoidea; Canthyloscelidae; Scatopsidae; Valeseguyidae

= Psychodomorpha =

Infraorder of insects

The nematoceran infraorder Psychodomorpha (sometimes misspelled as Psychomorpha, which is the name of a genus of noctuid moths) includes three families, Psychodidae, Blephariceridae, and Tanyderidae, as well as the superfamily Scatopsoidea, which contains the families Canthyloscelidae, Scatopsidae and Valeseguyidae.
