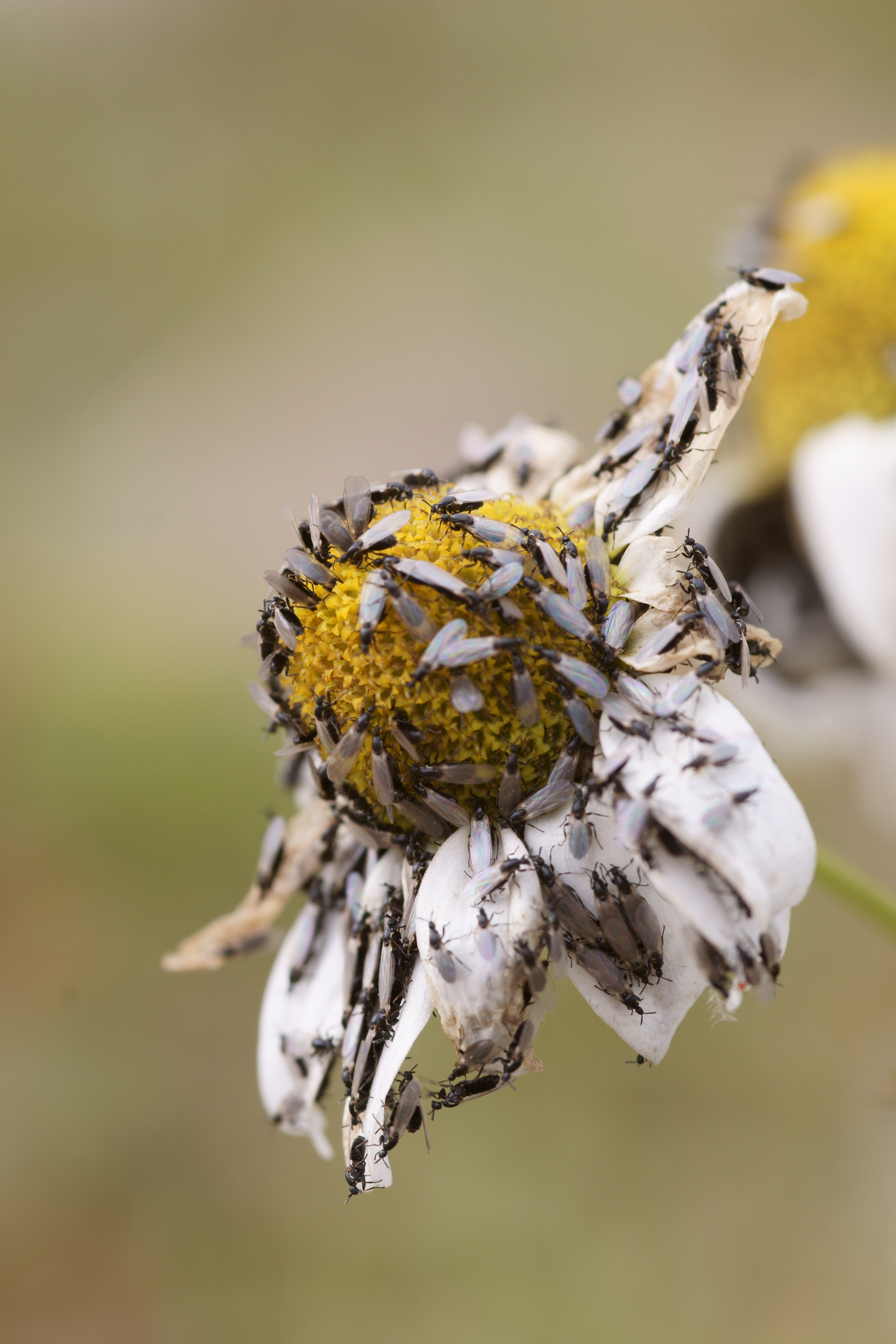
- Minute black scavenger flies on oxeye daisy.

Scientific classification
- Kingdom: Animalia
- Phylum: Arthropoda
- Clade: Pancrustacea
- Class: Insecta
- Order: Diptera
- Suborder: Nematocera
- Infraorder: Bibionomorpha
- Superfamily: Scatopsoidea

Families
- Canthyloscelidae; Scatopsidae; Valeseguyidae

= Scatopsoidea =

Superfamily of flies

Scatopsoidea is a superfamily of true flies that comprises the families Canthyloscelidae, Scatopsidae, and Valeseguyidae. There are about 400 known species worldwide but more may yet to be discovered, especially in the tropics.

== Identification ==
In Scatopsoidea, the posterior margin of the katepisternum is displaced to a more posterior disposition, causing the pleural suture to be folded. The superfamily also has a well-developed sperm pump and associated apodemes.

== Phylogeny ==
Based on morphological features, Scatopsidae and Canthyloscelidae are sister groups to each other, and Valeseguyidae is the sister group to them.

An analysis of nuclear and mitochondrial gene markers supported the monophyly of Scatopsoidea. It also found that this superfamily is the sister group to Bibionomorpha.
