= Deuterophlebia shasta =

Scientific classification
- Domain: Eukaryota
- Kingdom: Animalia
- Phylum: Arthropoda
- Class: Insecta
- Order: Diptera
- Family: Deuterophlebiidae
- Genus: Deuterophlebia
- Species: D. shasta

Binomial name
- Deuterophlebia shasta Wirth, 1951

Species of mountain midge

Deuterophlebia shasta is a species of mountain midge in the family Deuterophlebiidae.
