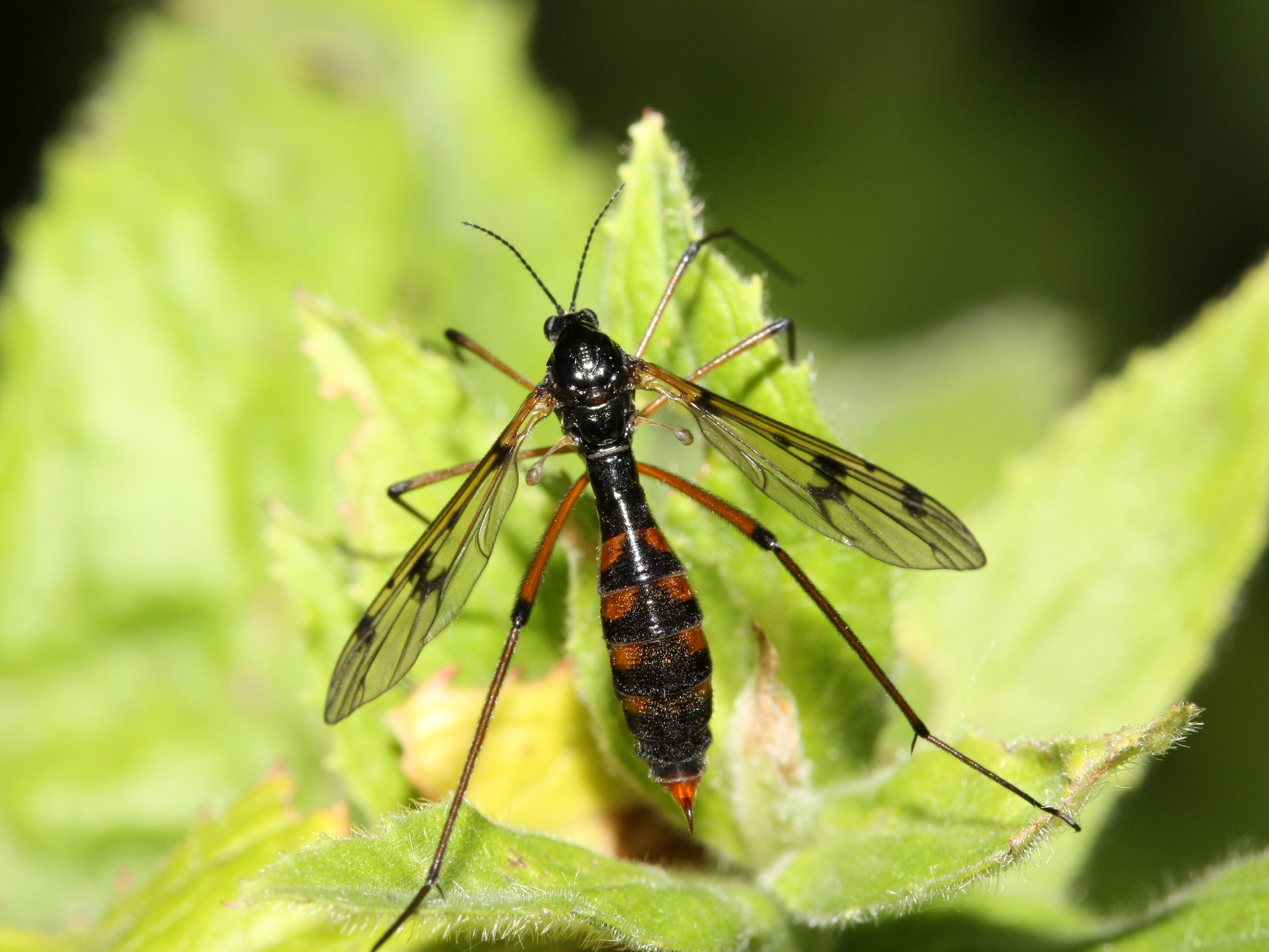
- Ptychoptera contaminata

Scientific classification
- Domain: Eukaryota
- Kingdom: Animalia
- Phylum: Arthropoda
- Class: Insecta
- Order: Diptera
- Suborder: Nematocera
- Infraorder: Ptychopteromorpha

Families
- Ptychopteridae - Phantom crane flies; Tanyderidae - Primitive crane flies

= Ptychopteromorpha =

Group of insects

Ptychopteromorpha is a taxonomic group within the suborder Nematocera consisting of two uncommon families. In older classifications, these families were included within the infraorder Tipulomorpha, based on superficial similarities (e.g., slender bodies and long legs). The inclusion of the families Tanyderidae and Ptychopteridae was based on the foldability of the last tarsomere in males. Molecular studies show no close relationship between the Tanyderidae and the Ptychopteridae, and support for this grouping is limited.
