= H1 neuron =

Neuron in flies

The H1 neuron is located in the visual cortex of true flies of the order Diptera and mediates motor responses to visual stimuli. H1 is sensitive to horizontal motion in the visual field and enables the fly to rapidly and accurately respond to optic flow with motor corrections to stabilize flight. It is particularly responsive to horizontal forward motion associated with movement of the fly's own body during flight. Damage to H1 impairs the fly's ability to counteract disturbances during flight, suggesting that it is a necessary component of the optomotor response. H1 is an ideal system for studying the neural basis of information processing due to its highly selective and predictable responses to stimuli. Since the initial anatomical and physiological characterizations of H1 in 1976, study of the neuron has greatly benefited the understanding of neural coding in a wide range of organisms, especially the relationship between the neural code and behavior.

== Anatomy ==
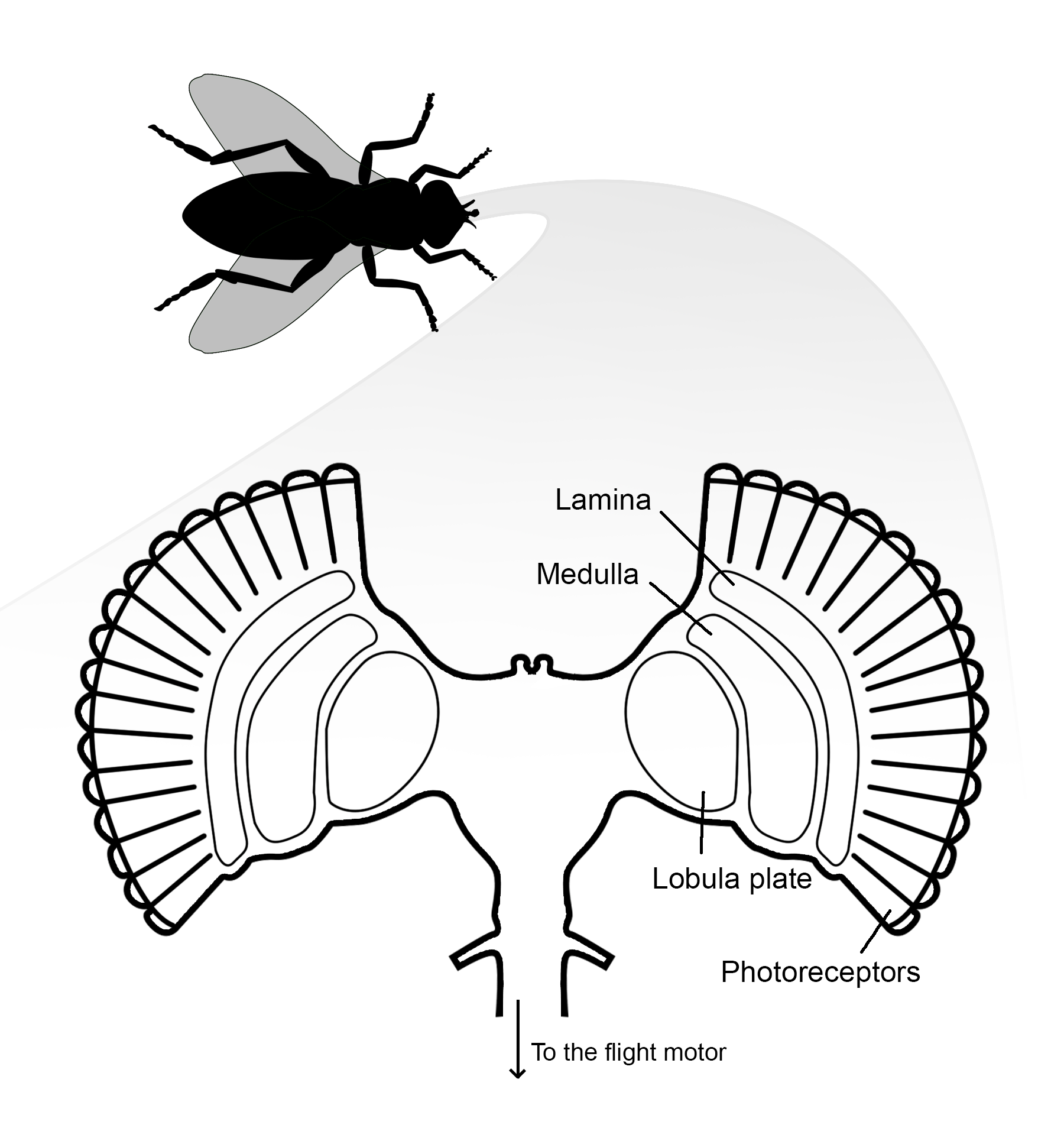
Fly brain

Flies possess two H1 neurons, one in each hemisphere of the brain. H1 is a lobula plate tangential cell (LPTC) located in the lobula plate of the optic lobe, the final destination of visual information originating from photoreceptors of the eye. The lobula plate forms the posterior part of the lobula complex where the LPTCs are located. The large process diameter of these neurons allowed them to be amongst the first visual neurons to be intracellularly recorded in the fly. H1 axons are about 5 μm diameter, 1200 μm long, and myelinated with a spike conduction velocity of 1 meter/second.

== Phylogeny ==
Neurons sensitive to motion during flight are not specific to flies, and have been found in numerous nondipterous insect groups including Odonata, Lepidoptera, and Hymenoptera. As in flies, these neurons receive input from both eyes and are sensitive to optic flow rotations corresponding to movement of the flying insect's body, suggesting motion sensitive neurons are an essential component of optomotor responses throughout the insect kingdom.

== Connectivity ==
Fly eyes are composed of many individual ommatidia that possess their own lenses and photoreceptors. The dendritic arbor of the H1 neuron covers the anterior surface of the lobula plate, where it receives retinotopic input from interneurons of the medulla lobula. To respond to image motion, the H1 neuron sends action potentials of varying frequency to the contralateral lobula plate.

=== Hardwiring ===
Unlike human brains that rely on experience-dependent neuronal plasticity, the brain of the fly is hardwired for particular tasks in the visual sensory system. The H1 neuron and related tangential neurons are suggested to be genetically determined, meaning that these neurons are unaffected by visual stimuli during early development. Parts of the fly brain have neuroplasticity but the H1 and other tangential neurons are hardwired neuronal machinery. Genetic hardwiring is likely an adaptation strategy that allow the flies to navigate in flight soon after hatching, actions largely mediated by the H1 and related tangential neurons.

== Function ==
Flies are agile flyers and strongly depend on vision during flight. For visual course control, flies optic flow field is analyzed by a set of ~60 motion-sensitive neurons, each present in the third visual neuropil of the left and right eyes. A subset of these neurons is thought to be involved in using the optic flow to estimate the parameters of self-motion, such as yaw, roll, and sideward translation. Other neurons are thought to be involved in analyzing the content of the visual scene itself, for example, to separate figure from ground using motion parallax. The H1 neuron is responsible for detecting horizontal motion across the entire visual field of the fly, allowing the fly to generate and guide stabilizing motor corrections mid-flight with respect to yaw.

== Exploring the Neural Code ==
Three characteristics of H1, reliability, specificity, and sensitivity, make it exceptionally well suited for testing proposed models of neural encoding.

=== Reliability ===
Visual information in optical systems is inhibited by the temporal and spatial attributes of the sensory input, and by the biophysical properties of the neuronal circuits. How neural circuits encode behaviorally relevant information is dependent on the computational capacity of the nervous system with relation to the ambient conditions the organisms normally operate in. H1 neurons are proven to be very efficient encoders of information via their high resilience to stimulus noise from external sources. The operational and encoding processes of sensory pathways are often negatively affected by both external noise (relating to the stimulus) and internal noise (imperfect physiological processes); however, the activity of H1 is unaffected by photon noise. Instead, neuronal noise intrinsic to the H1 neural architecture is the limiting factor for accurate responses to stimuli. This dramatically reduces the noise of H1 electrophysiological readings, and provides the reliability necessary for accurate study conclusions.

=== Specificity ===
H1 exhibits very specific and predictable responses to directional stimuli, characteristics that are greatly beneficial for exploring the neural code because they allow for confident correlations between neural activity and stimuli. H1 neurons are known as Horizontally Sensitive (HS) cell, meaning HS cells depolarize most strongly in response to horizontal stimuli, and hyperpolarize when the direction of motion is opposite. HS cells, and their counterpart Vertically Sensitive (VS) cells, respond to a fixed direction regardless of the color or contrast of the background or the stimulus, making these neuronal systems ideal for testing. H1 exhibits a response to the stimulation of a single ommatidium, and can discriminate between translational motion of 2-3˚ in the visual field.

=== Sensitivity ===
The response amplitude of H1 decreases during high velocity flight, thus becoming more sensitive to changes in optic flow speed and image contrast, and increasing the dynamic range over which H1 operates. Changes in H1 axonal membrane potential is proportional to the amplitude of optic image velocity. However, medullary interneurons that synapse with H1 exhibit periodic, local changes in membrane potential as optic image velocities increases. To rectify this discrepancy, the dendrites of H1 temporally integrate these local fluctuations, resulting in a linear relationship between H1 axon membrane potential and stimulus intensity. This adaptation allows flies to rapidly transition between stationary, hovering, and swift modes of flight.
