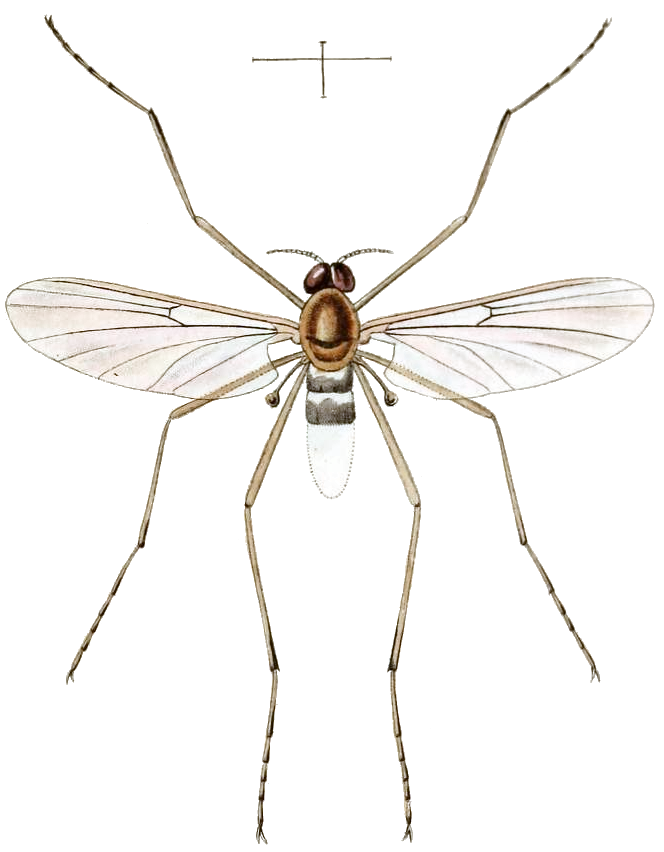
- Blepharicera fasciata imago in Westwood 1842

Scientific classification
- Domain: Eukaryota
- Kingdom: Animalia
- Phylum: Arthropoda
- Class: Insecta
- Order: Diptera
- Suborder: Nematocera
- Infraorder: Blephariceromorpha

Families
- Blephariceridae; Deuterophlebiidae; Nymphomyiidae

= Blephariceromorpha =

Infraorder of flies

The Blephariceromorpha are an infraorder of nematoceran flies, including three families associated with fast-flowing, high-mountain streams, where the larvae can be found.

One recent classification based largely on fossils splits this group into two infraorders, and removes the Nymphomyiidae to its own suborder, but this has not gained wide acceptance. More recently, the family Blephariceridae has been considered a member of the infraorder Psychodomorpha, with Deuterophlebiidae and Nymphomyiidae either assigned their own infraorders or left unassigned to infraorder. The placement of these three families remains controversial.
