= Nymphomyiidae =

Nymphomyiidae Temporal range: Cenomanian–Recent

Scientific classification
- Kingdom: Animalia
- Phylum: Arthropoda
- Clade: Pancrustacea
- Class: Insecta
- Order: Diptera
- Suborder: Nematocera
- Infraorder: Nymphomyiomorpha
- Family: Nymphomyiidae; Tokunaga, 1932

Family of flies

The Nymphomyiidae are a family of tiny (2 mm) slender, delicate flies (Diptera). Larvae are found among aquatic mosses in small, rapid streams in northern regions of the world, including northeastern North America, Japan, the Himalayas, and eastern Russia. Around a dozen extant species are known, with two fossil species found in amber, extending back to the Mid Cretaceous. Under an alternative classification, they are considered the only living representatives of a separate, suborder called Archidiptera (or Archaediptera) which includes several Triassic fossil members. The family has characteristics associated with the Nematocera as well as the Brachycera. The antennae are shortened as in the Brachycera and these flies are long, having a snout with vestigeal mouthparts, non-differentiated abdominal segments with large cerci. The wings are narrow and hair-fringed and have very weak venation. They are known to form cloud-like swarms in summer and the short-lived non-feeding adults have wings that fracture at the base shortly after mating.

The family Nymphomyiidae has several species which were originally placed in separate genera of their own. Nymphomyia alba, the type species for this family, was discovered in a fast-flowing stream in Japan by Masaaki Tokunaga in 1932. This was followed by Palaeodipteron walkeri described by Ide in Quebec in 1965 and Felicitomyia brundini was described from the Himalayas in 1970. Hennig examined the pupal characteristics of Nymphomyia and placed it in the family Psychodidae. Rohdendorf considered Nymphomyia so distinct that he put it in a separate superfamily Nymphomyioidea related to Triassic Dictyodipteridae which are in a suborder Archidiptera. Modern classifications put all the species in a single genus Nymphomyia. Based on larval morphology, the family has been suggested to be close to the Deuterophlebiidae while others place them in a separate infraorder, the Nymphomyiomorpha.

Nymphomyiidae are neotenic, retaining various larval features. They have strap-like wings with a very reduced venation, and the wing margins have long fringes like those of the Thysanoptera. The wings break at the base after mating. The antennae are very reduced. Species in the genus Nymphomyia have atrophied mouthparts. Nymphomyiidae are unusual in that the adults are ventrally holoptic, meaning they possess two eyes that meet on the underside of the head. Adults form large swarms above water. One or two generations may breed in a single year depending on the region and climate.

Nymphomyiidae are thought to be closely related to the extinct Strashilidae from the Jurassic of Asia, which are thought to have had a similar lifestyle.

== Species ==
Currently all species are treated as members of a single genus:

- Nymphomyia Tokunaga, 1932
  - N. alba Tokunaga, 1932 - Japan
  - N. levanidovae Rohdendorf & Kalugina, 1974 - Siberia
  - N. brundini (Kevan, 1970) - Himalayas
  - N. holoptica Courtney 1994 - Hong Kong
  - N. rohdendorfi Makarchenko, 1979 - Siberia
  - N. walkeri (Ide, 1964) - Canada
  - Nymphomyia dolichopeza Courtney, 1994 - North America
  - Nymphomyia allissae† (Burmese amber)
  - Nymphomyia succina† (Baltic amber)
