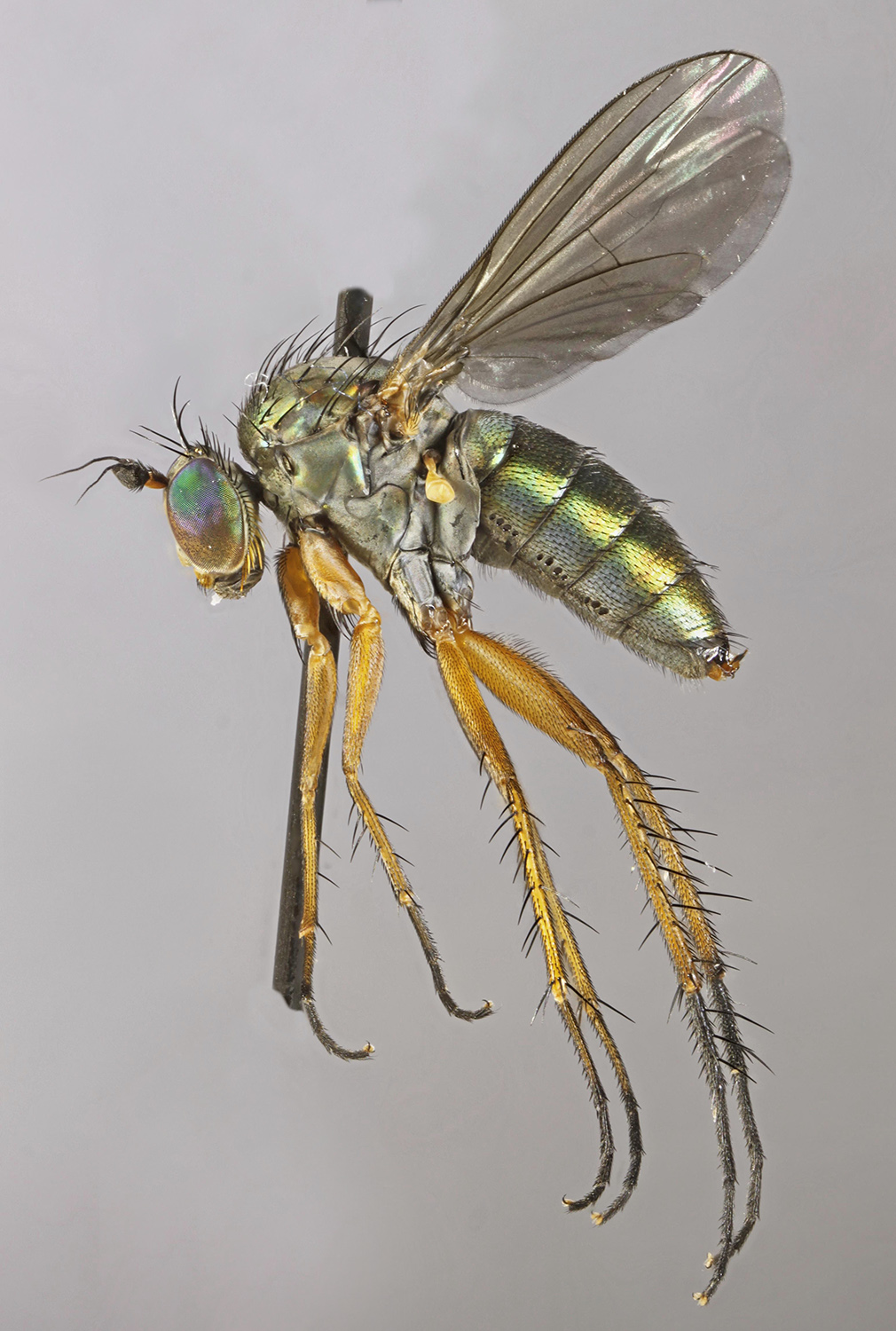
- Dolichopus pennatus North Wales

Scientific classification
- Kingdom: Animalia
- Phylum: Arthropoda
- Clade: Pancrustacea
- Class: Insecta
- Order: Diptera
- Family: Dolichopodidae
- Genus: Dolichopus
- Species: D. pennatus

Binomial name
- Dolichopus pennatus Meigen, 1824

= Dolichopus pennatus =

Species of fly

Dolichopus pennatus is a species of fly in the family Dolichopodidae. It is found in the Palearctic.
