= Valeseguyidae =

Valeseguyidae Temporal range: Cenomanian–Recent

Scientific classification
- Domain: Eukaryota
- Kingdom: Animalia
- Phylum: Arthropoda
- Class: Insecta
- Order: Diptera
- Superfamily: Scatopsoidea
- Family: Valeseguyidae; Amorim and Tozoni 1994

Genera
- Valeseguya; †Cretoseguya

Family of flies

Valeseguyidae is a family of flies, belonging to Scatopsoidea. It contains only one known extant species, Valeseguya rieki, known from a single male specimen found in Victoria, Australia, described in 1990. It was initially classified as a member of the wood gnat family Mycetobiidae, but was later given its own family in 2006. Two fossil species are known, including another species of Valeseguya, V. disjuncta, which is known from Miocene aged Dominican amber from the Caribbean, and Cretoseguya, containing the single species C. burmitica, which is known from the mid-Cretaceous Burmese amber of Myanmar, dating to around 100 million years ago.
