= Adenotrophic viviparity =

Reproductive mode of some insects

Adenotrophic viviparity means "gland fed, live birth". This is the reproductive mode of insects such as tsetse flies (Glossinidae), keds (Hippoboscidae) and bat flies (Streblidae and Nycteribiidae), as adenotrophic viviparity is a characteristic feature of the superfamily Hippoboscoidea. It has also been observed in members of the subfamily Mesembrinellinae.

In adenotrophic viviparity, the eggs (usually one at a time) are retained within the female's body, hatch, and are nourished through "milk glands" until the developed larvae are ready to pupate. The larvae are then 'larviposited' and immediately pupate. This is one way insects avoid predation during their most vulnerable life stage. Following the birth of the juvenile, lactation ceases and a period of involution of the milk gland secretory cells begins where they return to their original size. During this period, embryogenesis begins in the next egg.

The glands producing the milk secretions differ between the Hippoboscoidea and Mesembrinellinae observances; in the latter, lactation occurs via accessory glands and spermathecae as opposed to specific milk glands. In either case, the milk secretions are closely analogous to mammalian milk, including proteins such as lipocalins and MGP2–10 proteins (the latter of which are analogous to caseins in mammals) and bacterial endosymbionts (such as Wigglesworthia glossinidia in the tsetse fly).

Adenotrophic viviparity differs from ovoviviparity, in which one or more eggs hatch internally in the female, but they are not nourished after hatching and are immediately 'larviposited' and continue their development outside the female.
