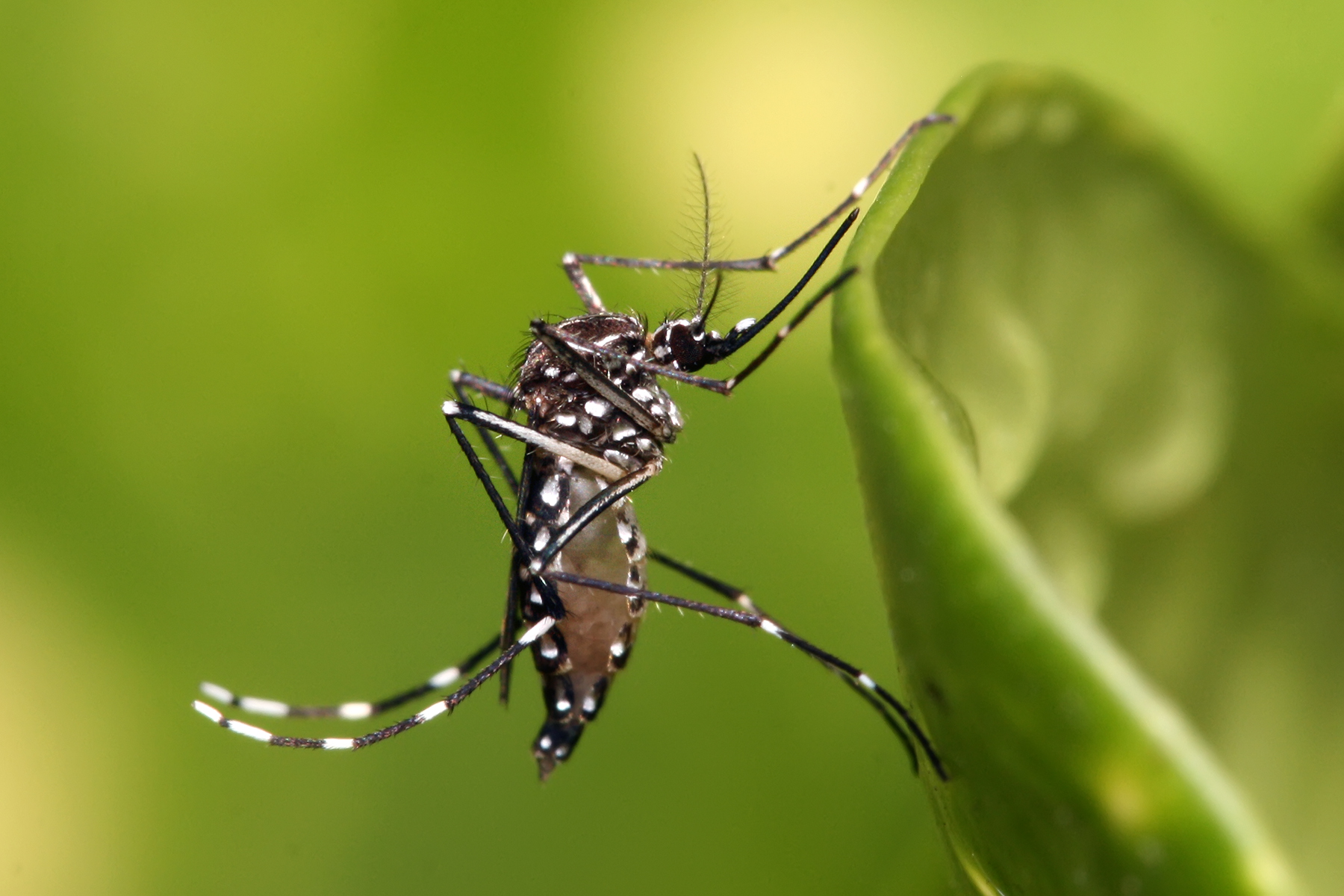
- Aedes aegypti, a disease-carrying mosquito

Scientific classification
- Kingdom: Animalia
- Phylum: Arthropoda
- Clade: Pancrustacea
- Class: Insecta
- Order: Diptera
- Suborder: Nematocera; Duméril, 1805

Groups included
- Infraorders Axymyiomorpha Bibionomorpha (Blephariceromorpha) Culicomorpha Deuterophlebiomorpha Nymphomyiomorpha Perissommatomorpha Psychodomorpha Ptychopteromorpha Tipulomorpha

Cladistically included but traditionally excluded taxa
- Brachycera

= Nematocera =

Suborder of flies

Swarming nematocera flies.

The Nematocera (nemato+cera meaning "thread-horns") are a suborder of elongated flies with thin, segmented antennae and mostly aquatic larvae. This group is paraphyletic, containing all flies except for those of the suborder Brachycera (the name meaning "short-horns"), which includes species such as the housefly or the common fruit fly. Thus, the equivalent clade to Nematocera would be the whole of Diptera, with Brachycera as a "subclade". Families in Nematocera include mosquitoes, crane flies, gnats, black flies, and multiple families commonly known as midges.

The nematoceran imago typically have elongated bodies and legs, and many species have relatively long abdomens. They also have fairly long, fine, finely-jointed antennae; in many species, such as most mosquitoes, the female antennae are more or less threadlike, but the males have spectacularly feather-like or plumose antennae.

The larvae of most nematoceran families are aquatic, either free-swimming, rock-dwelling, plant-dwelling, or luticolous (mud-dwelling). Some families however, are not aquatic; for instance the Tipulidae tend to be soil-dwelling and the Mycetophilidae feed on fungi such as mushrooms. Unlike most of the Brachycera, the larvae of Nematocera have distinct heads with mouthparts that may be modified for filter feeding or chewing, depending on their lifestyles. The pupae are orthorrhaphous which means that adults emerge from the pupa through a straight, longitudinal seam in the dorsal surface of the pupal cuticle.

Males of many species form mating swarms resembling faint pillars of smoke, competing for females that visit the cloud of males to find a mate.

== Phylogeny ==
A 2023 study revised the phylogeny of the Nematocera. The grouping remains paraphyletic with respect to the Brachycera, but is rearranged, with Deuterophlebiidae basal (sister to the rest), Nymphomyiidae placed inside Culicomorpha, and Blephariceridae within Psychodomorpha. Finally, Anisopodidae becomes sister to the Brachycera.

- Diptera
  - Deuterophlebiidae
  - - Tipulomorpha (crane flies)
    - - Axymyiomorpha
      - Ptychopteromorpha (phantom and primitive crane-flies)
      - Culicomorpha (mosquitoes, blackflies and midges, inc. Nymphomyiidae)
      - - Psychodomorpha (drain flies, sand flies, inc. Blephariceridae)
        - - Bibionomorpha (gnats)
          - - Anisopodidae (wood gnats)
            - Brachycera

== Families ==
These families belong to the suborder Nematocera:

- Anisopodidae Knab, 1912 - wood gnats or window-gnats
- Axymyiidae Shannon, 1921
- Bibionidae Fleming, 1821 - march flies and love bugs
- Blephariceridae Loew, 1861 - net-winged midges
- Bolitophilidae Winnertz, 1863
- Canthyloscelididae Enderlein, 1912
- Cecidomyiidae Newman, 1835 - gall midges or gall gnats
- Ceratopogonidae Newman, 1834 - biting midges
- Chaoboridae Newman, 1834 - phantom midges
- Chironomidae Newman, 1834 - chironomids or nonbiting midges
- Corethrellidae Edwards, 1932 - frog-biting midges
- Culicidae Meigen, 1818 - mosquitoes
- Cylindrotomidae Schiner, 1863 - cylindrotomid crane flies
- Deuterophlebiidae Edwards, 1922 - mountain midges
- Diadocidiidae Winnertz, 1863
- Ditomyiidae Keilin, 1919
- Dixidae Schiner, 1868 - meniscus midges
- Hesperinidae Schiner, 1864
- Keroplatidae Rondani, 1856 - predatory fungus gnats
- Limoniidae Rondani, 1856 - limoniid crane flies
- Lygistorrhinidae Edwards, 1925 - long-beaked fungus gnats
- Mycetophilidae Newman, 1834 - fungus gnats
- Nymphomyiidae Tokunaga, 1932
- Pachyneuridae Schiner, 1864
- Pediciidae Osten Sacken, 1859 - hairy-eyed crane flies
- Perissommatidae Colless, 1962
- Psychodidae Newman, 1834 - moth flies or drain flies
- Ptychopteridae Osten Sacken, 1862 - phantom crane flies
- Rangomaramidae Jaschhof & Didham, 2002
- Scatopsidae Newman, 1834 - minute black scavenger flies or dung midges
- Sciaridae Billberg, 1820 - dark-winged fungus gnats
- Simuliidae Newman, 1834 - black flies
- Tanyderidae Osten Sacken, 1880 - primitive crane flies
- Thaumaleidae Bezzi, 1913 - trickle midges
- Tipulidae Latreille, 1802 - large crane flies
- Trichoceridae Rondani, 1841 - winter crane flies
- Valeseguyidae Amorim & Grimaldi, 2006
- † Ansorgiidae Krzemiñski & Lukashevich, 1993
- † Antefungivoridae Rohdendorf, 1938
- † Archizelmiridae Rohdendorf, 1962
- † Asiochaoboridae Hong & Wang, 1990
- † Boholdoyidae Kovalev, 1985
- † Cascopleciidae Poinar Jr., 2010
- † Crosaphididae Kovalev, 1983
- † Elliidae Krzeminska, Blagoderov & Krezmiñski, 1993
- † Eoditomyiidae Ansorge, 1996
- † Eopolyneuridae Rohdendorf, 1962
- † Grauvogeliidae Krzemiñski, 1999
- † Hennigmatidae Shcherbakov, 1995
- † Heterorhyphidae Ansorge & Krzemiñski, 1995
- † Hyperpolyneuridae Rohdendorf, 1962
- † Luanpingitidae Zhang, 1986
- † Mesosciophilidae Rohdendorf, 1946
- † Nadipteridae Lukashevich, 1995
- † Palaeophoridae Rohdendorf, 1951
- † Paraxymyiidae Rohdendorf, 1946
- † Pleciofungivoridae Rohdendorf, 1946
- † Procramptonomyiidae Kovalev, 1983
- † Protendipedidae Rohdendorf, 1951
- † Protopleciidae Rohdendorf, 1946
- † Protorhyphidae Handlirsch, 1906
- † Protoscatopsidae Rohdendorf, 1946
- † Serendipidae Evenhuis, 1994
- † Siberhyphidae Kovalev, 1985
- † Strashilidae Rasnitsyn, 1992
- † Tanyderophrynidae Rohdendorf, 1962
- † Tethepomyiidae Grimaldi & Arillo, 2009
- † Tillyardipteridae Lukashevich & Shcherbakov, 1999
- † Tipulodictyidae Rohdendorf, 1962
- † Tipulopleciidae Rohdendorf, 1962
- † Vladipteridae Shcherbakov, 1995
