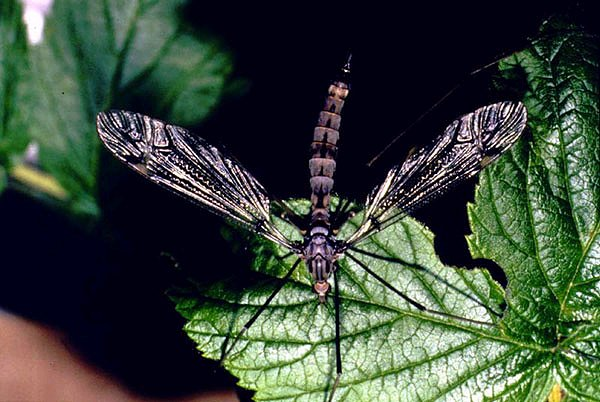
- Crane fly

Scientific classification
- Domain: Eukaryota
- Kingdom: Animalia
- Phylum: Arthropoda
- Class: Insecta
- Order: Diptera
- Suborder: Nematocera
- Infraorder: Tipulomorpha

Superfamilies and families
- Tipuloidea (typical crane flies); Cylindrotomidae; Pediciidae; Limoniidae; Tipulidae; Trichoceroidea (winter crane flies); Trichoceridae

= Tipulomorpha =

Crane flies and allies Temporal range: Triassic–Present

Infraorder of flies

The Tipulomorpha are an infraorder of Nematocera, containing the crane flies, a very large group, and allied families.

== Taxonomy ==
The Tipulomorpha comprise five extant families.

- Tipulomorpha
  - Tipuloidea (typical crane flies)
    - Cylindrotomidae (long-bodied crane flies)
    - Pediciidae (hairy-eyed crane flies)
    - Limoniidae (limoniid crane flies) – probably paraphyletic
    - Tipulidae (large crane flies)
  - Trichoceroidea (winter crane flies)
    - Trichoceridae

=== Extinct superfamilies ===
One recent classification based largely on fossils splits this group into a series of extinct superfamilies (below), and includes members of other infraorders, but this has not gained wide acceptance.

- Superfamily Eopolyneuroidea
  - Family Eopolyneuridae - (Upper Triassic)
  - Family Musidoromimidae - (Upper Triassic)
- Superfamily Tipulodictyoidea extinct
  - Family Tipulodictyidae - (Upper Triassic)
- Superfamily Tanyderophryneoidea extinct
  - Family Tanyderophryneidae - (Middle Jurassic)
