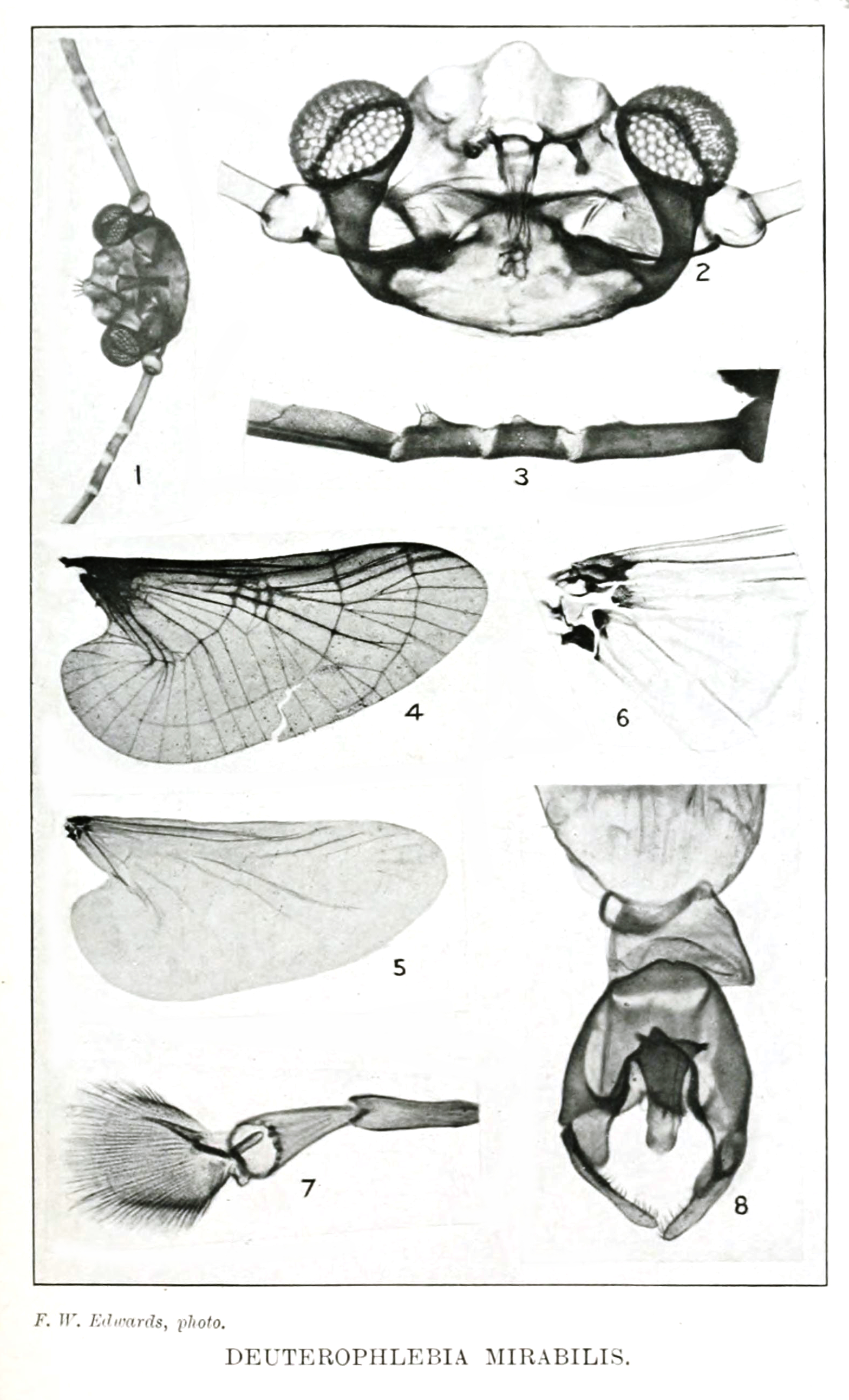

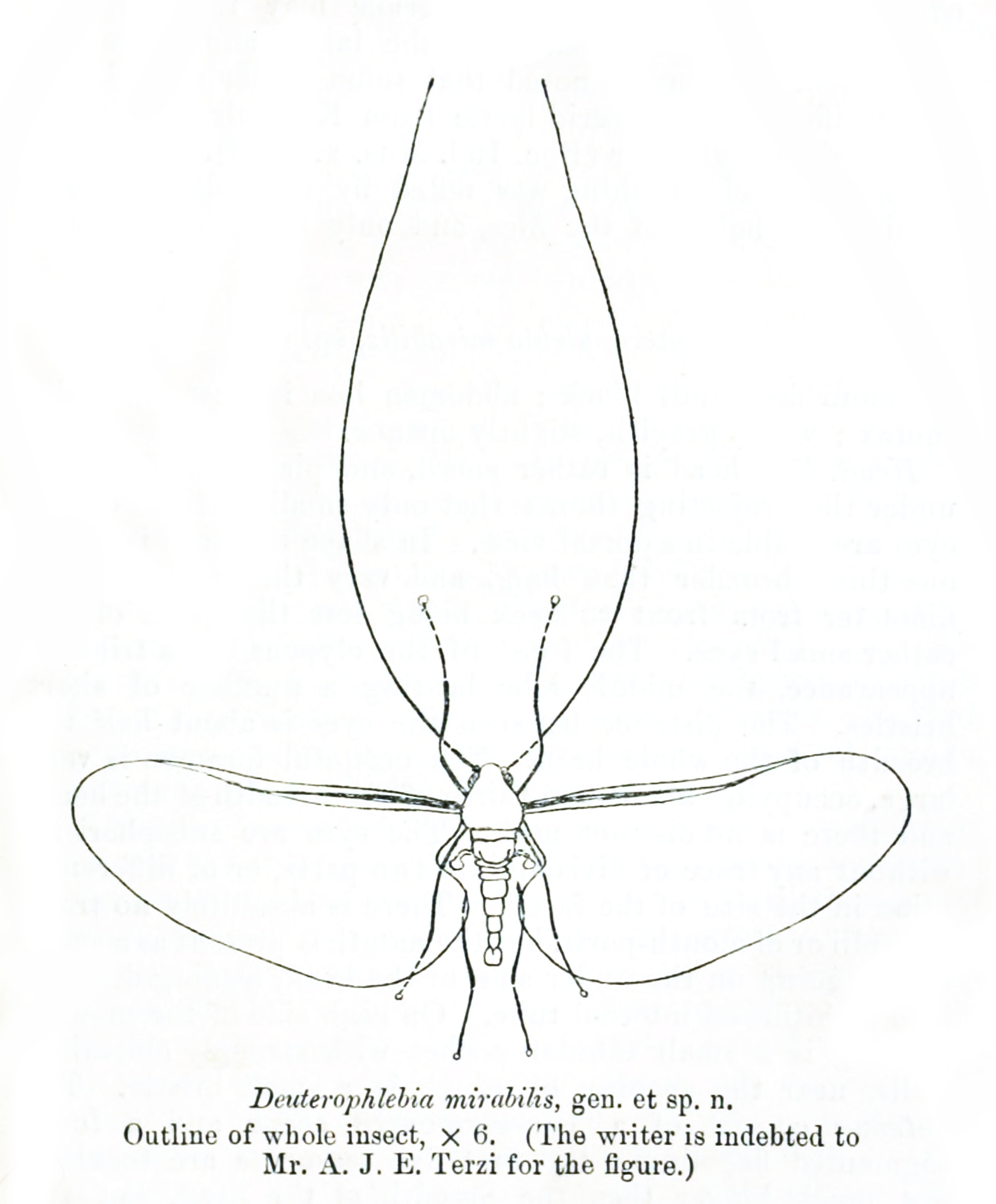
- Deuterophlebia mirabilis

Scientific classification
- Kingdom: Animalia
- Phylum: Arthropoda
- Clade: Pancrustacea
- Class: Insecta
- Order: Diptera
- Suborder: Nematocera
- Infraorder: Deuterophlebiomorpha
- Family: Deuterophlebiidae; Edwards, 1922
- Genus: Deuterophlebia; Edwards, 1922

= Deuterophlebia =

Genus of flies

Deuterophlebia is a genus of flies that are the sole living members of the small family Deuterophlebiidae, commonly known as the mountain midges. Adults have broad, fan-shaped wings, and males possess extraordinarily long antennae, which they use in territorial displays above swift mountain streams while awaiting emerging females.

== Description and biology ==
The family comprises about fourteen described species, distributed mainly throughout the temperate regions of the Northern Hemisphere. They are strongly associated with fast-flowing, cold mountain rivers and streams, from which their common name derives.

Larvae are dorsoventrally flattened and cling tightly to rock surfaces in turbulent water using large, eversible, hook-tipped prolegs on the abdomen. These structures allow them to resist current while grazing on fine organic detritus and microbial films. Pupae occur on the same smooth stones, often in small depressions or crevices.

Adults emerge at dawn to form brief swarms above rushing water, where males defend territories and display with their oversized antennae. They are delicate flies with short adult lifespans—typically only a few hours—and are not known to feed. Their broad, silvery wings are often reflective in sunlight. Females have smaller heads and reduced mouthparts; after mating, they submerge to lay eggs on submerged substrates, reportedly shedding their wings in the process, although this has rarely been observed directly.

== Distribution and habitat ==
Deuterophlebiidae occur primarily in the Holarctic region, favoring steep, well-oxygenated mountain streams. Their extreme habitat specialization has likely contributed to their limited diversity and fragmented distribution.

== Taxonomy and phylogeny ==
Some classifications place this family in its own infraorder, Deuterophlebiomorpha, though this arrangement is not widely accepted. Recent molecular phylogenies identify the group as the sister lineage to all other extant Diptera, highlighting its basal evolutionary position within the order.

== Fossil record ==
Fossil members of Deuterophlebidiae have been described from mid-Cretaceous Burmese amber of Myanmar, dating to roughly 100 million years ago. These fossils indicate that the lineage has remained morphologically conservative since the Mesozoic.

== Species ==
Species of the genus are known from Afghanistan, Kashmir, Northeast India, China, Japan, Korea, Eastern Siberia, and western North America from Alaska to California to Colorado.

Catalogue of Life accepts the following species within Deuterophlebia:

- Deuterophlebia bicarinata Courtney, 1994
- Deuterophlebia blepharis Courtney, 1994
- Deuterophlebia brachyrhina Courtney, 1994
- Deuterophlebia coloradensis Pennak, 1945
- Deuterophlebia inyoensis Kennedy, 1960
- Deuterophlebia mirabilis Edwards, 1922
- Deuterophlebia nielsoni Kennedy, 1958
- Deuterophlebia nipponica Kitakami, 1938
- Deuterophlebia oporina Courtney, 1994
- Deuterophlebia personata Courtney, 1990
- Deuterophlebia sajanica Jedlička & Halgoš, 1981
- Deuterophlebia shasta Wirth, 1951
- Deuterophlebia tyosenensis Kitakami, 1938
- Deuterophlebia vernalis Courtney, 1990
