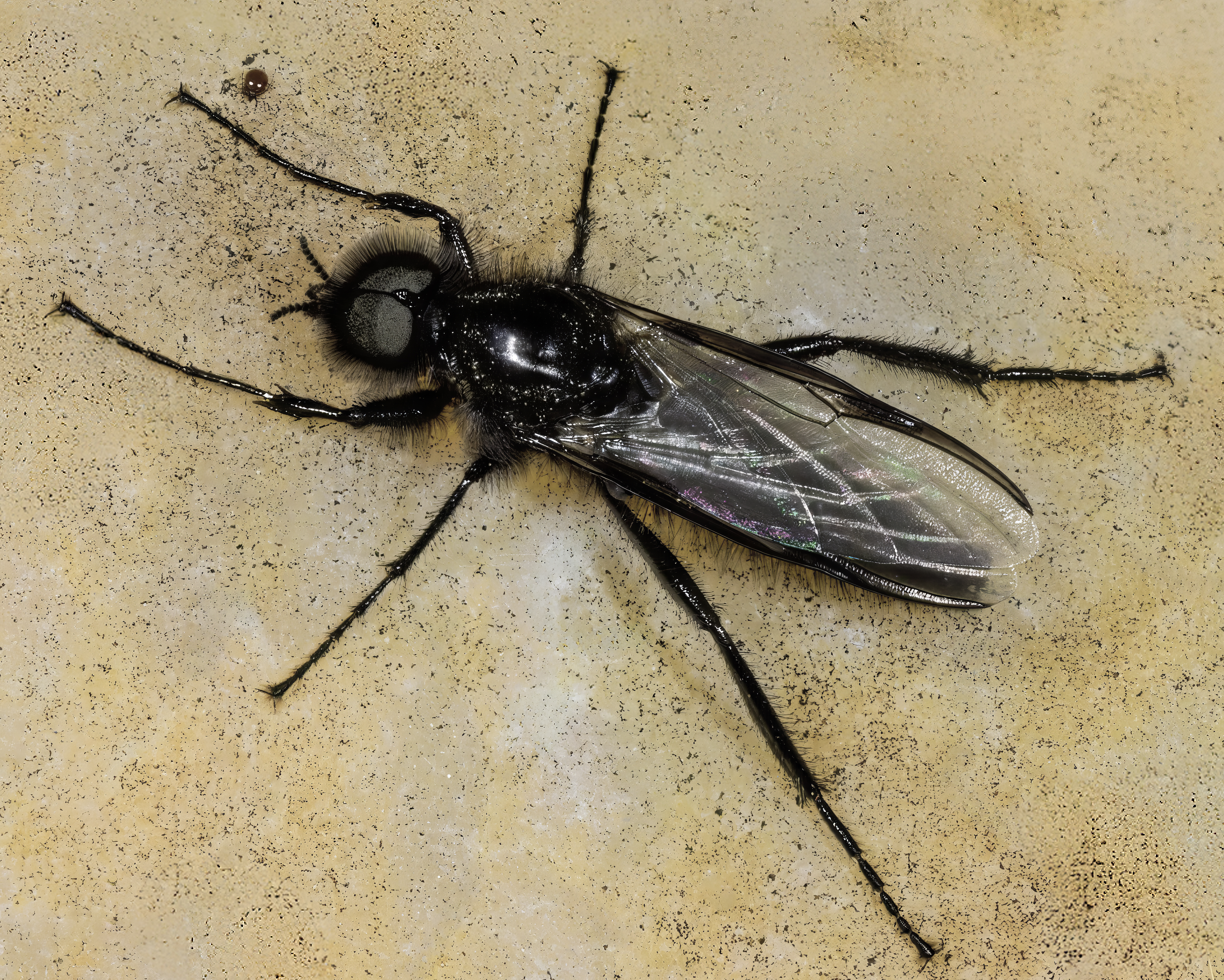
- March fly, Bibio marci

Scientific classification
- Kingdom: Animalia
- Phylum: Arthropoda
- Class: Insecta
- Order: Diptera
- Suborder: Nematocera
- Infraorder: Bibionomorpha

Families
- see text

= Bibionomorpha =

March flies and allies

Infraorder of flies

The Bibionomorpha are an infraorder of the suborder Nematocera. One of its constituent families, the Anisopodidae, is the presumed sister taxon to the entire suborder Brachycera. Several of the remaining families in the infraorder (those shown without common names) are former subfamilies of the Mycetophilidae, which has been recently subdivided. The family Axymyiidae has recently been removed from the Bibionomorpha to its own infraorder Axymyiomorpha.

Most representatives of the Bibionomorpha are saprophages or fungivores as larvae with the Cecidomyiidae being predominantly gall-formers. Some sciarids are common indoor pests, developing large populations in potting soil that has become moldy from overwatering. The larvae of the Bibionidae sometimes migrate in large, snake-like masses to minimize dehydration while seeking a new feeding site.

== Superfamilies and families ==
- Superfamily Anisopodoidea Knab, 1912 (Triassic - Recent)
  - Anisopodidae (syn Mycetobiidae, †Eopleciidae) - wood gnats
  - †Antefungivoridae Rohdendorf, 1938 (syn Pleciomimidae, Sinemediidae)
  - †Crosaphididae Kovalev, 1983 (Triassic-Jurassic)
  - †Pleciofungivoridae Rohdendorf, 1946 (syn Fungivoritidae) (Upper Triassic - Middle Cretaceous)
  - †Protorhyphidae Handlirsch, 1906 (Upper Triassic)
  - †Siberhyphidae Kovalev, 1985 (Jurassic)
- Superfamily Bibionoidea Fleming, 1821 (Cretaceous - Recent)
  - Bibionidae (syn †Cascopleciidae) - march flies and lovebugs
  - Hesperinidae Walker, 1848
- Superfamily Pachyneuroidea Rohdendorf, 1946
  - †Procramptonomyiidae Kovalev, 1985
- Superfamily Scatopsoidea Newman, 1834
  - Canthyloscelidae Shannon, 1927
  - †Protoscatopsidae Rohdendorf, 1946 (Middle Jurassic)
  - Scatopsidae Newman, 1834
  - Valeseguyidae Amorim & Tozoni, 1994
- Superfamily Sciaroidea Billberg, 1820
  - †Archizelmiridae Rohdendorf, 1962 (Middle Jurassic)
  - Bolitophilidae Winnertz, 1863
  - Cecidomyiidae Newman, 1834 - gall gnats
  - Diadocidiidae Winnertz, 1863
  - Ditomyiidae Edwards, 1921
  - Keroplatidae Rondani, 1856 (incl. Lygistorrhinidae Edwards, 1925)
  - Mycetophilidae Newman, 1834 - fungus gnats
  - †Paraxymyiidae Rohdendorf, 1946 (Middle Jurassic)
  - Rangomaramidae Jaschhof & Didham, 2002
  - Sciaridae Billberg, 1820 - dark winged fungus gnats
- Superfamily incertae sedis
  - †Heterorhyphidae Ansorge & Krzemiński, 1995
  - Pachyneuridae
  - †Protobibionidae extinct (Middle Jurassic)
  - †Protopleciidae (syn Palaeopleciidae, Pleciodictyidae, Protoligoneuridae) (Late Triassic - Jurassic)
  - †Tipulopleciidae extinct (Middle Jurassic)
