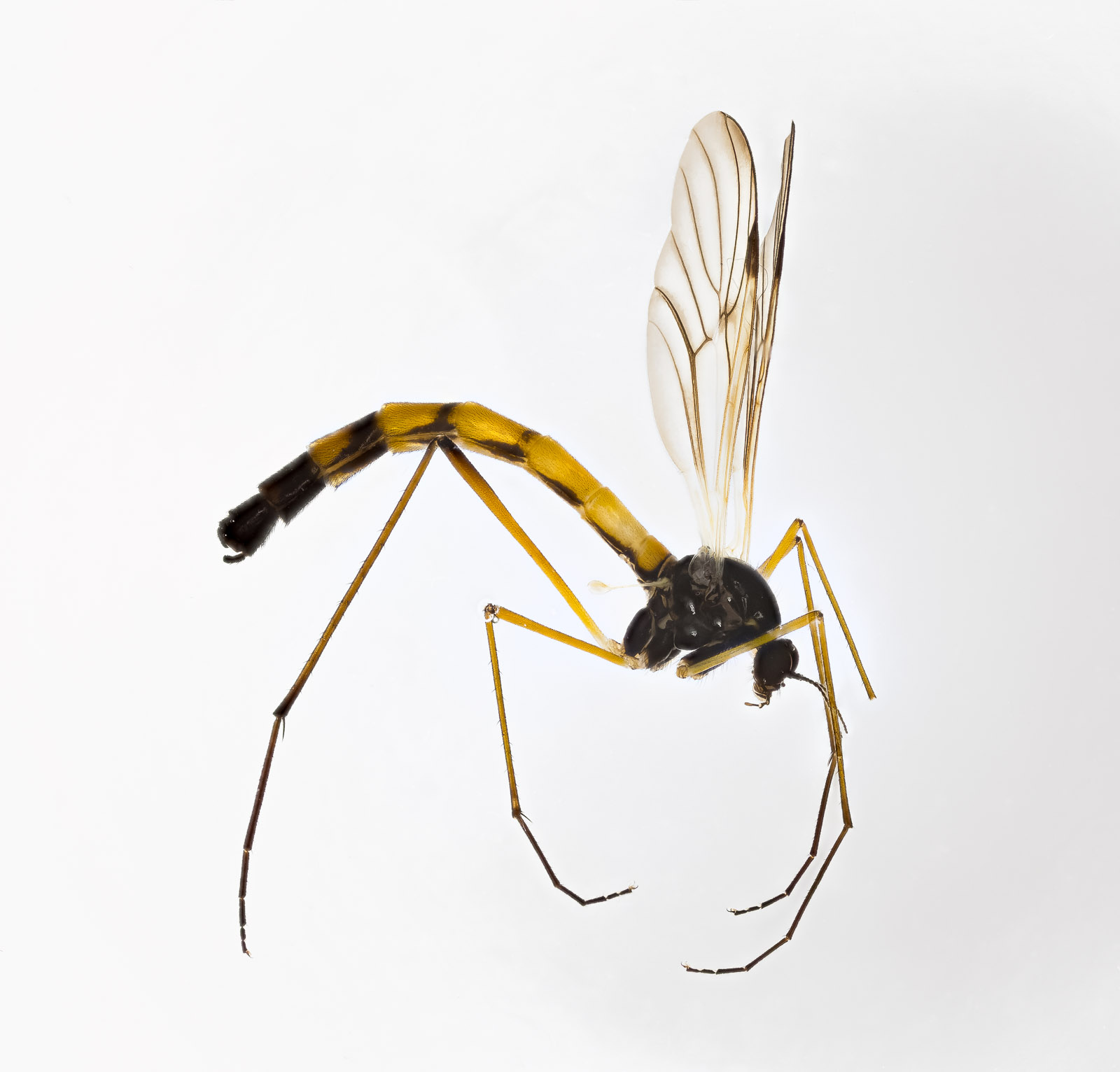
- Pachyneura fasciata, male

Scientific classification
- Domain: Eukaryota
- Kingdom: Animalia
- Phylum: Arthropoda
- Class: Insecta
- Order: Diptera
- Suborder: Nematocera
- Infraorder: Bibionomorpha
- Superfamily: Bibionoidea
- Family: Pachyneuridae; Schiner, 1864

= Pachyneuridae =

Family of flies

Pachyneuridae is a family of flies of the infraorder Bibionomorpha, order Diptera. There are at least 8 described species in 7 genera in Pachyneuridae. The larvae live in rotting wood.

== Genera ==
- Cramptonomyia
- Haruka
- Pachyneura
- Pergratospes
