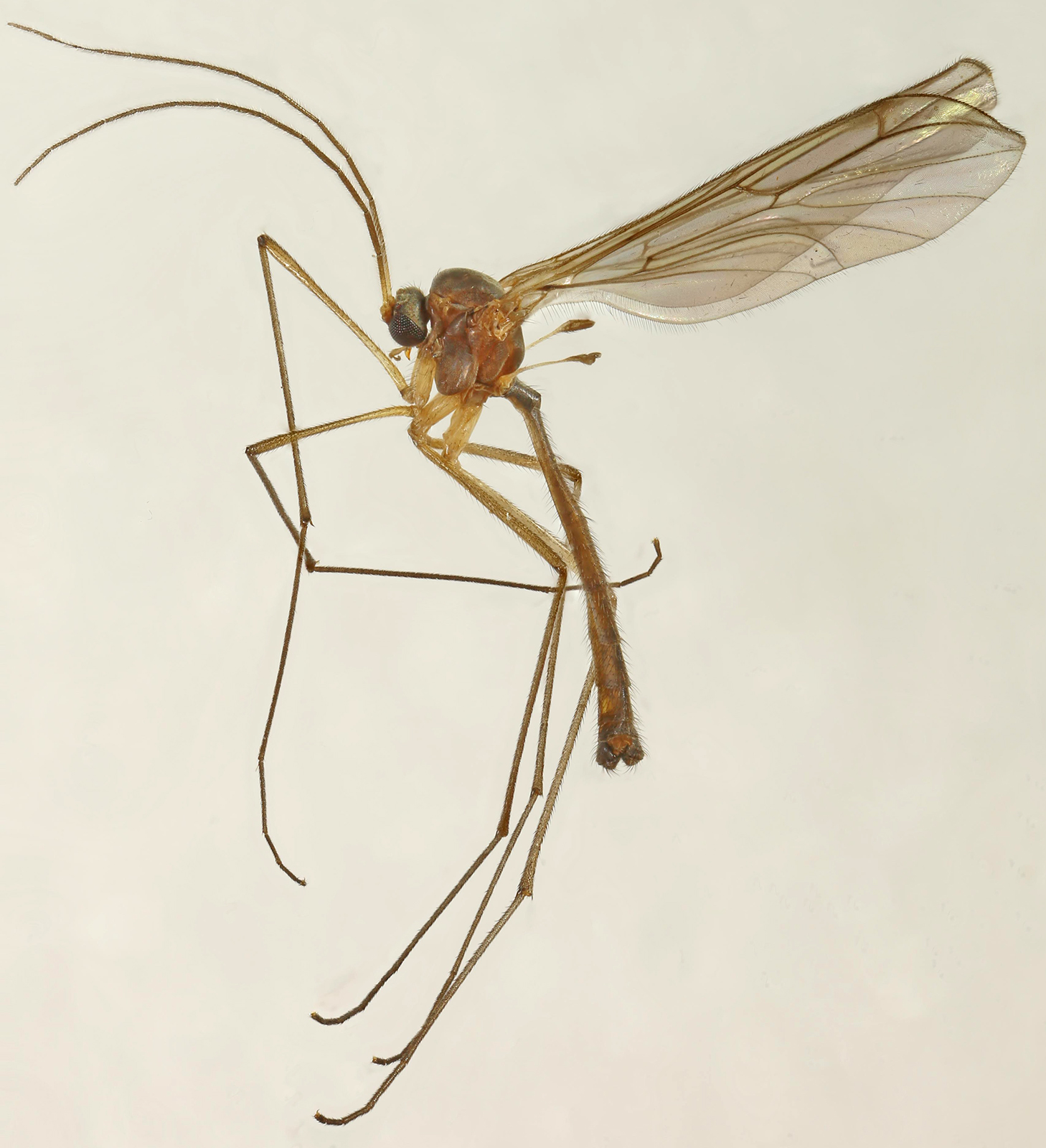
- Bolitophila cinerea North Wales

Scientific classification
- Kingdom: Animalia
- Phylum: Arthropoda
- Clade: Pancrustacea
- Class: Insecta
- Order: Diptera
- Family: Bolitophilidae
- Genus: Bolitophila
- Species: B. cinerea

Binomial name
- Bolitophila cinerea Meigen, 1818

= Bolitophila cinerea =

Species of fly

Bolitophila cinerea is a Palearctic (Ireland to South Siberian Mountains) species of 'fungus gnat' in the family Bolitophilidae.

The eucephalic larvae of Bolitophila are mycetophagous and live in decaying wood or other organic debris overgrown by fungal plant substrates. The pupa lacks a puparium. Bolitophila cinerea feeds on a variety of Hypholoma and Pholiota species also on species of Agaricus, Amanita, Armillaria, Boletus, Collybia, Flammulina, Hebeloma, Lacrymaria and Marasmius. Adults have been obtained in emergence traps in a range of situations including rotting wood and soil litter.

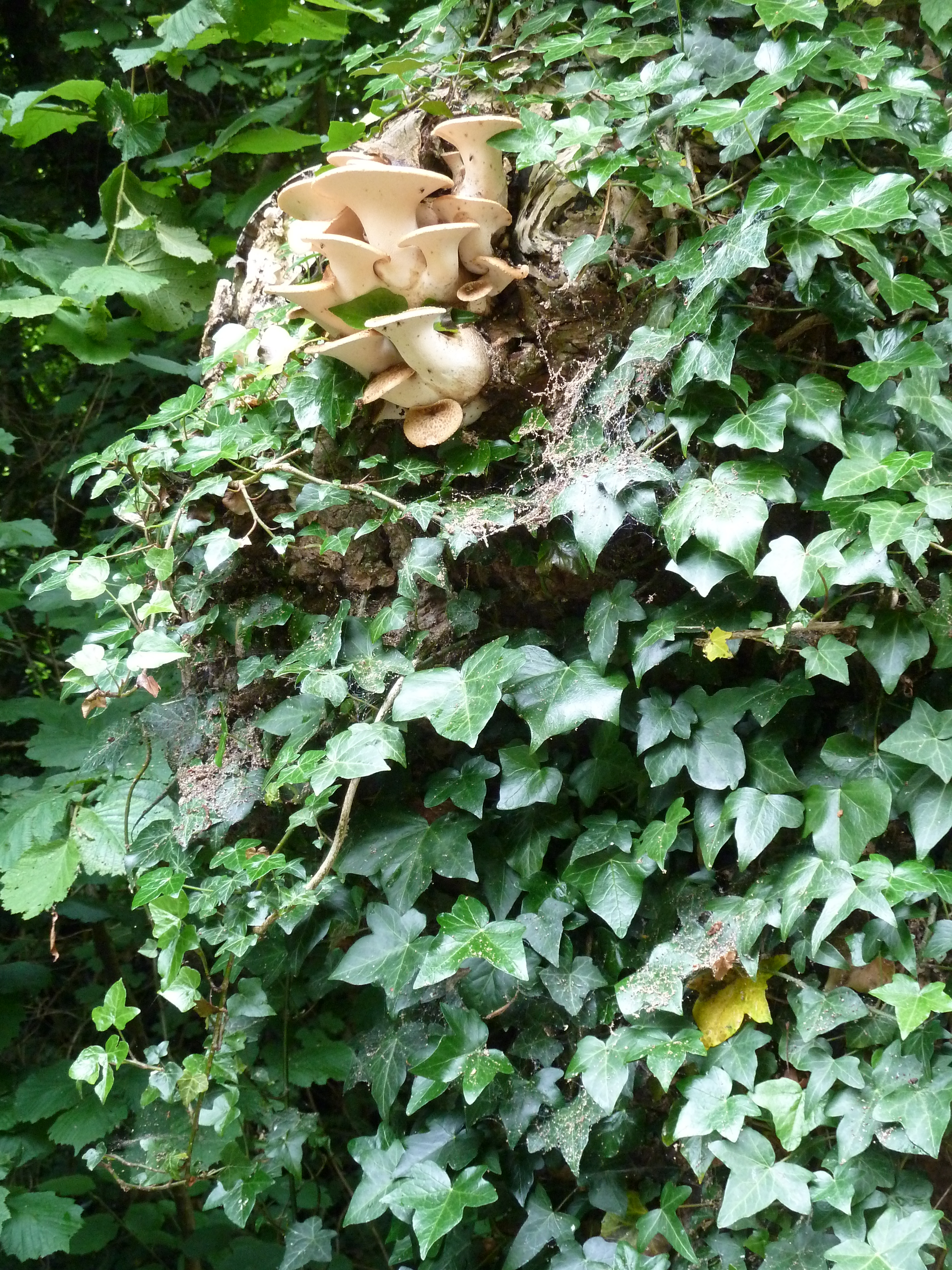
Habitat

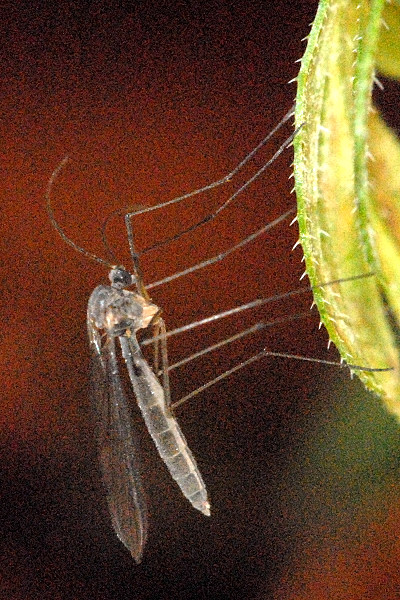
Habitus

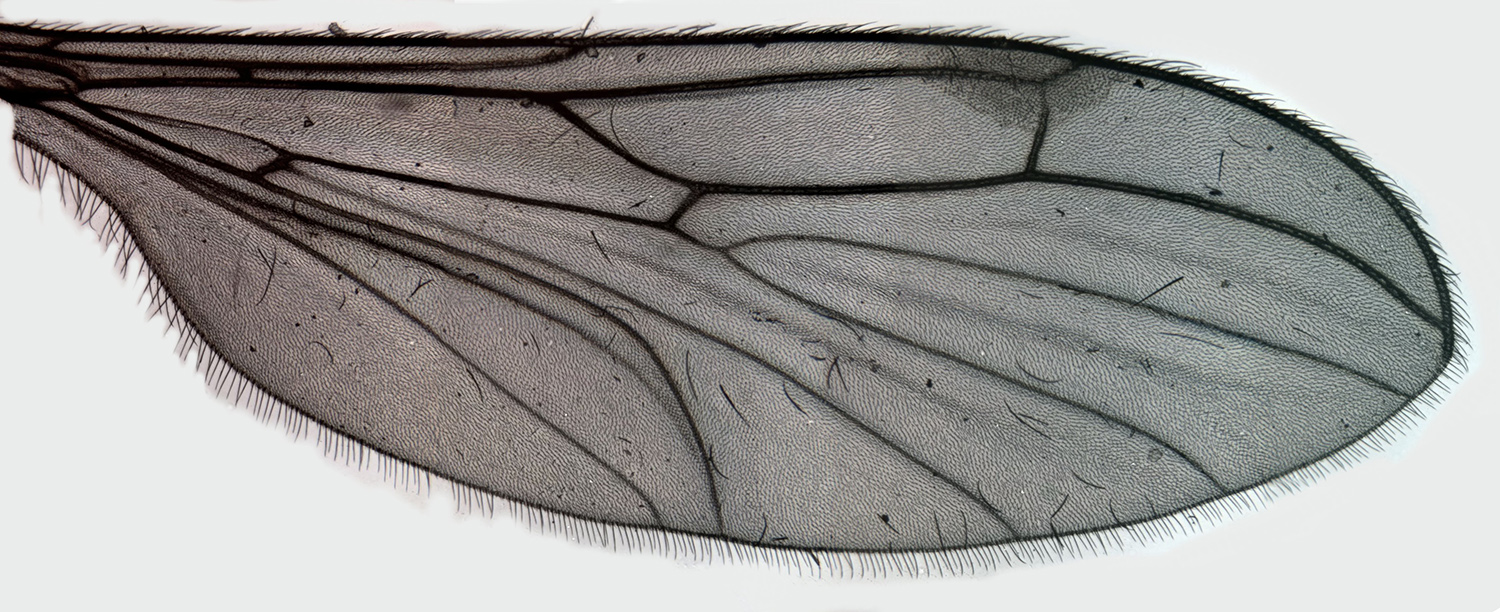
Wing
