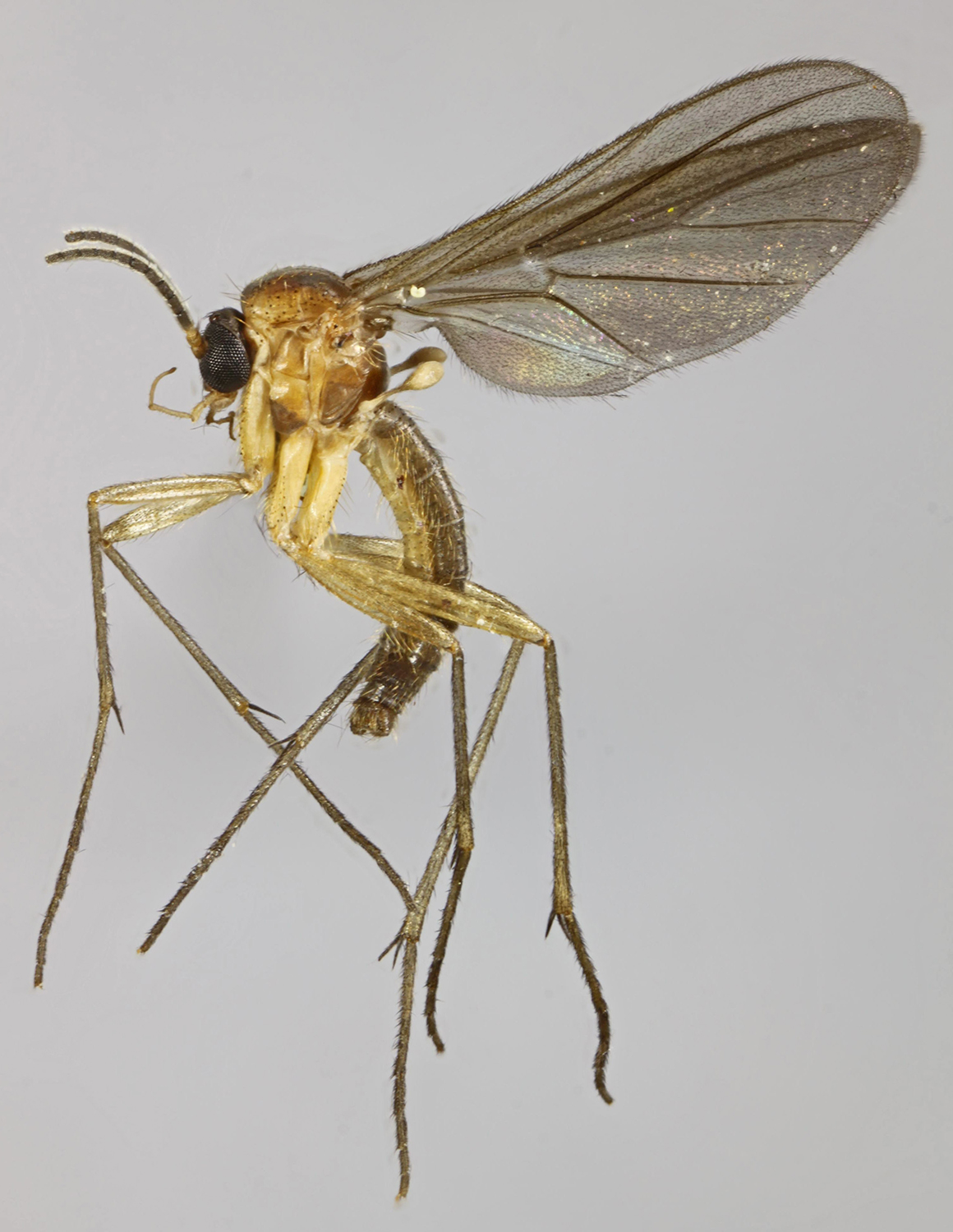
- Diadocidia ferruginosa North Wales

Scientific classification
- Domain: Eukaryota
- Kingdom: Animalia
- Phylum: Arthropoda
- Class: Insecta
- Order: Diptera
- Family: Diadocidiidae
- Genus: Diadocidia
- Species: D. ferruginosa

Binomial name
- Diadocidia ferruginosa (Meigen, 1830)

= Diadocidia ferruginosa =

Species of fly

Diadocidia ferruginosa is a Palearctic species of fungus gnat in the family Mycetophilidae. They live as larvae in long dry silken tubes under bark or in rotten wood (Edwards 1925) and probably feed on fungal mycelia (Zaitzev 1994) or spores (Matile 1997). Also associated with Peniophora.

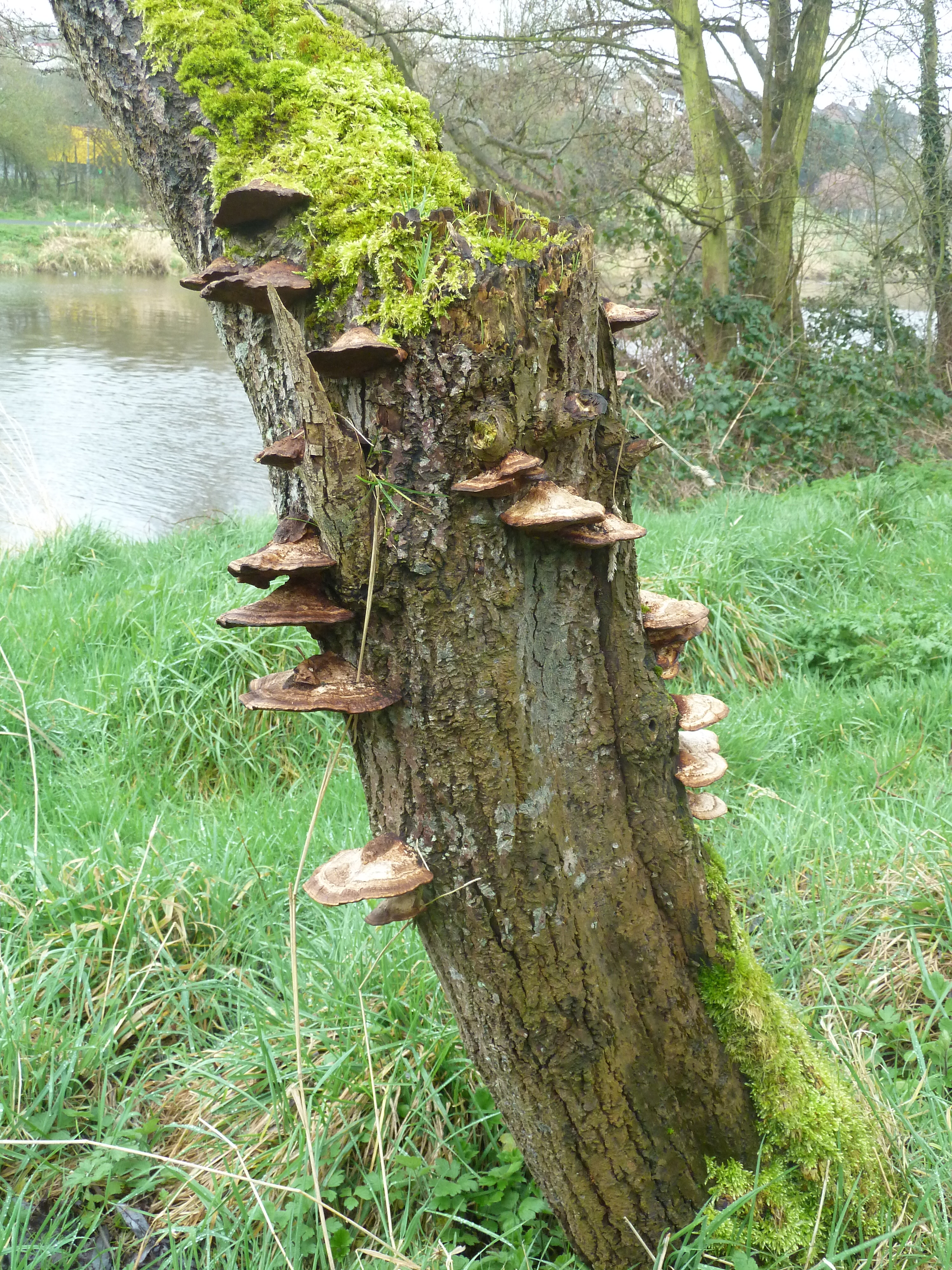
Habitat. Ireland.
