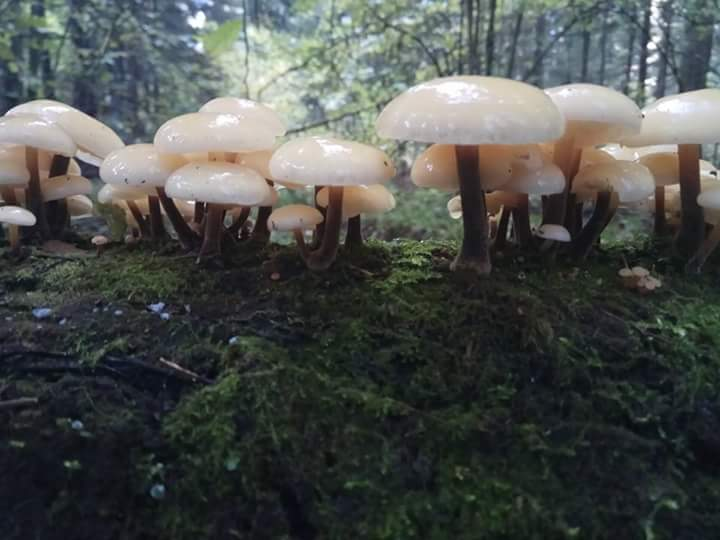
- Flammulina fennae

Scientific classification
- Domain: Eukaryota
- Kingdom: Fungi
- Division: Basidiomycota
- Class: Agaricomycetes
- Order: Agaricales
- Family: Physalacriaceae
- Genus: Flammulina
- Species: F. fennae

Binomial name
- Flammulina fennae Bas

= Flammulina fennae =

Species of fungus

Flammulina fennae is an edible winter mushroom. It is very similar to closely related species Flammulina velutipes, but differs by having a paler cap.

As with all the Flammulina species, it grows on wood, mainly of elm and poplar trees. It can withstand winter and freezing weather conditions.

Though it is rare compared with F. velutipes, it is well represented in Russia.

Its edibility and culinary practice are the same as F. velutipes.

Particular attention should be paid to not confuse it with highly toxic Galerina species.
