= Galactan endo-beta-1,3-galactanase =

Identifiers
- EC no.: 3.2.1.181

Databases
- IntEnz: IntEnz view
- BRENDA: BRENDA entry
- ExPASy: NiceZyme view
- KEGG: KEGG entry
- MetaCyc: metabolic pathway
- PRIAM: profile
- PDB structures: RCSB PDB PDBe PDBsum
Search
- PMC: articles
- PubMed: articles
- NCBI: proteins

Galactan endo-beta-1,3-galactanase (EC 3.2.1.181, endo-beta-1,3-galactanase) is an enzyme with systematic name arabinogalactan 3-beta-D-galactanohydrolase. This enzyme catalyses the following chemical reaction

The enzyme specifically hydrolyses beta-1,3-galactan and beta-1,3-galactooligosaccharides

The enzyme from the fungus Flammulina velutipes (winter mushroom) hydrolyses the beta(1->3) bonds found in type II plant arabinogalactans.
