= Eudicrana obumbrata =

Scientific classification
- Domain: Eukaryota
- Kingdom: Animalia
- Phylum: Arthropoda
- Class: Insecta
- Order: Diptera
- Family: Mycetophilidae
- Genus: Eudicrana
- Species: E. obumbrata

Binomial name
- Eudicrana obumbrata Loew, 1869

Species of fly

Eudicrana obumbrata is a species of fungus gnats in the family Mycetophilidae.
