= Haruka (fly) =

Scientific classification
- Domain: Eukaryota
- Kingdom: Animalia
- Phylum: Arthropoda
- Class: Insecta
- Order: Diptera
- Family: Pachyneuridae
- Genus: Haruka

Genus of flies

Haruka is a genus of nematoceran flies in the family Pachyneuridae. There is at least one described species in Haruka, H. elegans.
