= Rangomarama =

Scientific classification
- Domain: Eukaryota
- Kingdom: Animalia
- Phylum: Arthropoda
- Class: Insecta
- Order: Diptera
- Family: Rangomaramidae
- Genus: Rangomarama; Jaschhof & Didham, 2002

Genus of flies

Rangomarama is a genus of fungus gnats in the family Rangomaramidae.

== Species ==
- Rangomarama edwardsi Jaschhof & Didham, 2002
- Rangomarama humboldti Jaschhof & Didham, 2002
- Rangomarama leopoldinae Jaschhof & Didham, 2002
- Rangomarama matilei Jaschhof & Didham, 2002
- Rangomarama tonnoiri Jaschhof & Didham, 2002
