= Antefungivoridae =

Antefungivoridae Temporal range: Pliensbachian–Aptian

Scientific classification
- Domain: Eukaryota
- Kingdom: Animalia
- Phylum: Arthropoda
- Class: Insecta
- Order: Diptera
- Suborder: Nematocera
- Infraorder: Bibionomorpha
- Superfamily: Sciaroidea
- Family: †Antefungivoridae; Rohdendorf, 1938

Family of flies

Antefungivoridae is an extinct family of fungus gnats and gall midges in the order Diptera. There are about 9 genera and more than 40 described species in Antefungivoridae.

== Genera ==
These nine genera belong to the family Antefungivoridae:

- † Antefungivora Rohdendorf, 1938
- † Antiquamedia Rohdendorf, 1938
- † Aortomima Zhang, Zhang, Liu & Shangguan, 1986
- † Baishuilingella Lin, 1980
- † Lycoriomimodes Rohdendorf, 1946
- † Mimallactoneura Rohdendorf, 1946
- † Paralycoriomima Rohdendorf, 1946
- † Pleciomima Rohdendorf, 1938
- † Sciaromima Kovalev, 1990
