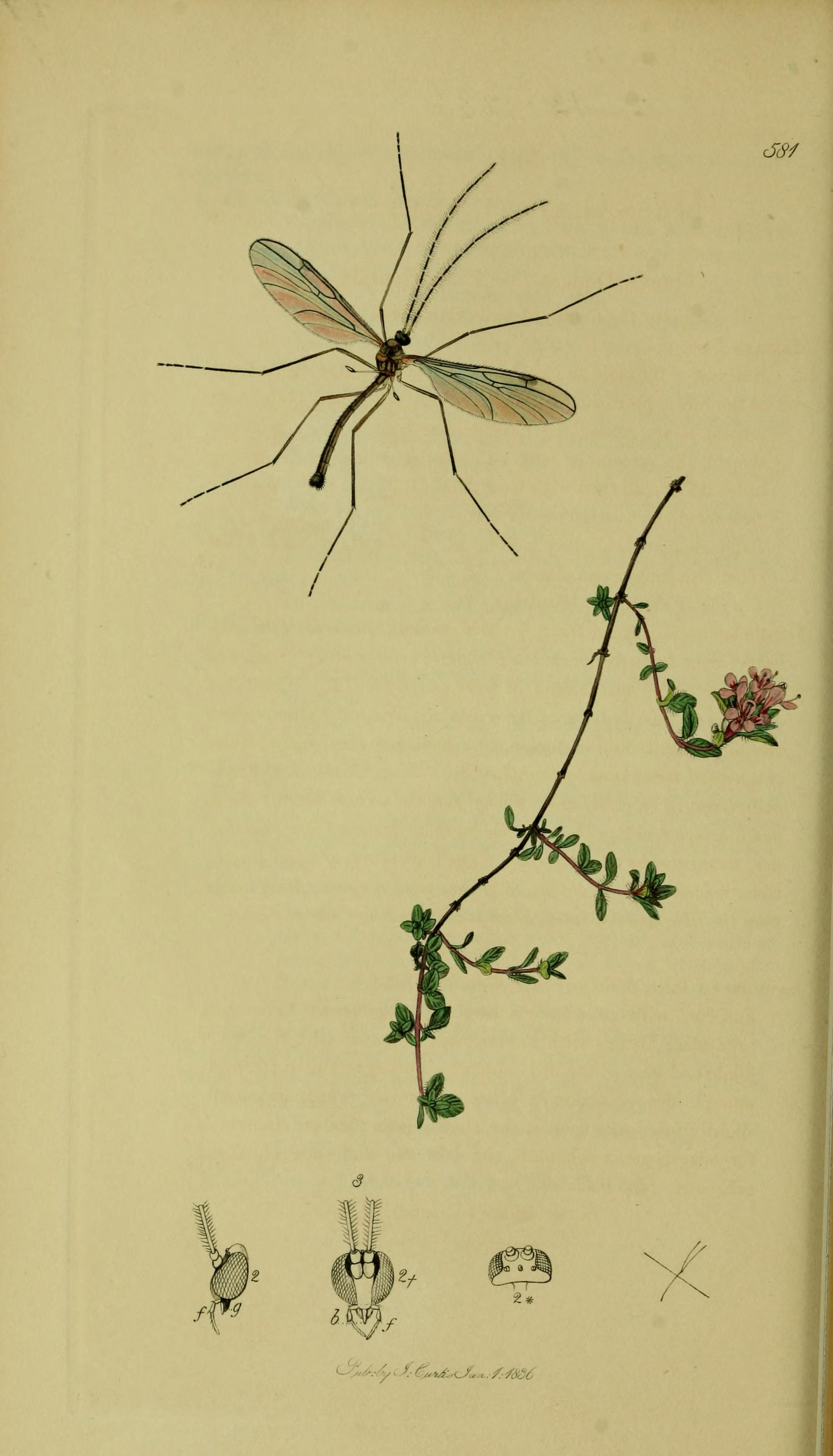
- Bolitophila saundersii in British Entomology

Scientific classification
- Domain: Eukaryota
- Kingdom: Animalia
- Phylum: Arthropoda
- Class: Insecta
- Order: Diptera
- Family: Bolitophilidae
- Genus: Bolitophila
- Species: B. saundersii

Binomial name
- Bolitophila saundersii Curtis, 1836

= Bolitophila saundersii =

Species of fly

Bolitophila saundersii is a Palearctic species of 'fungus gnat' in the family Bolitophilidae. The larvae of Bolitophila are mycetophagous and live in decaying wood or other organic debris overgrown by fungal plant substrates. The name honours William Wilson Saunders.

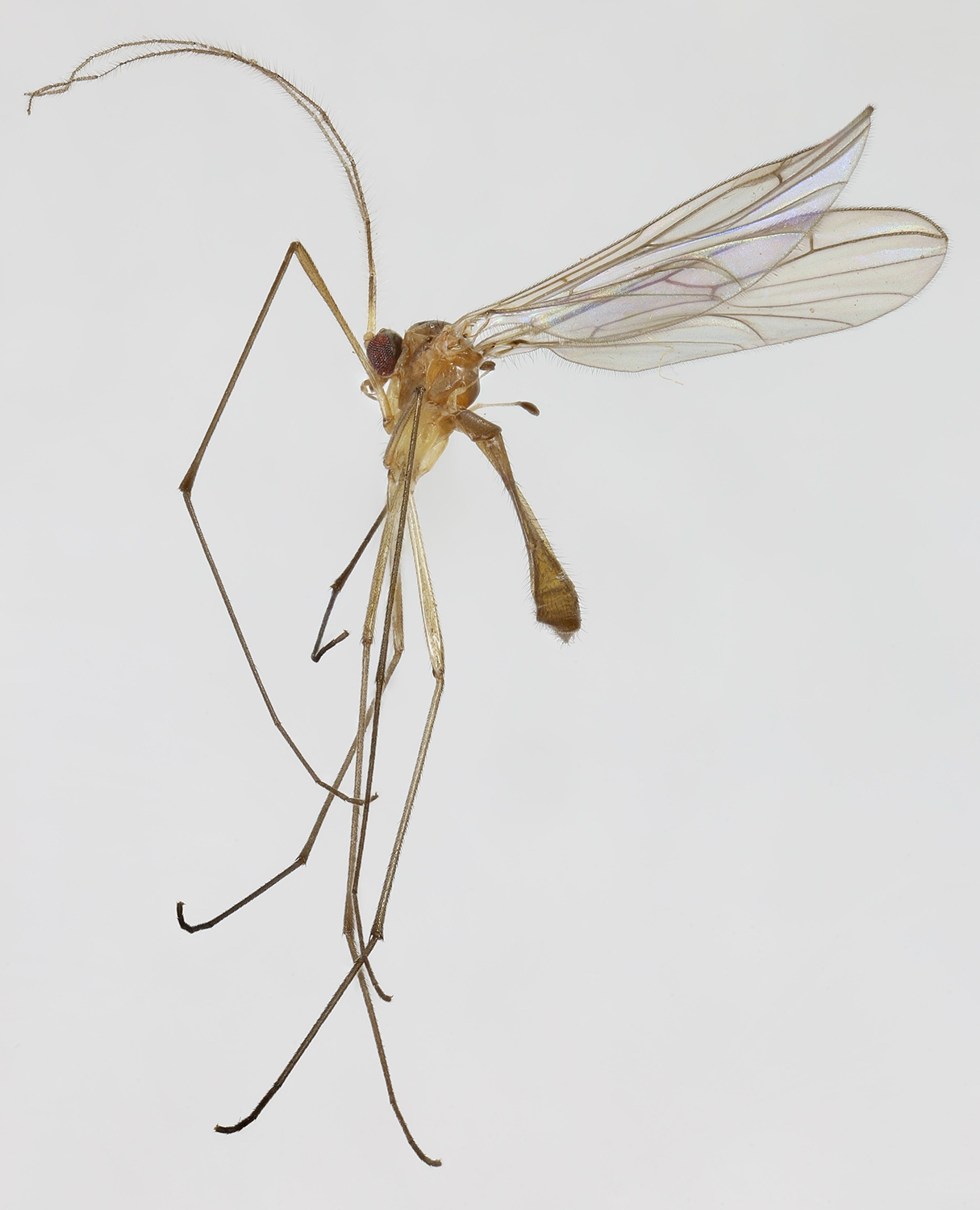
Specimen

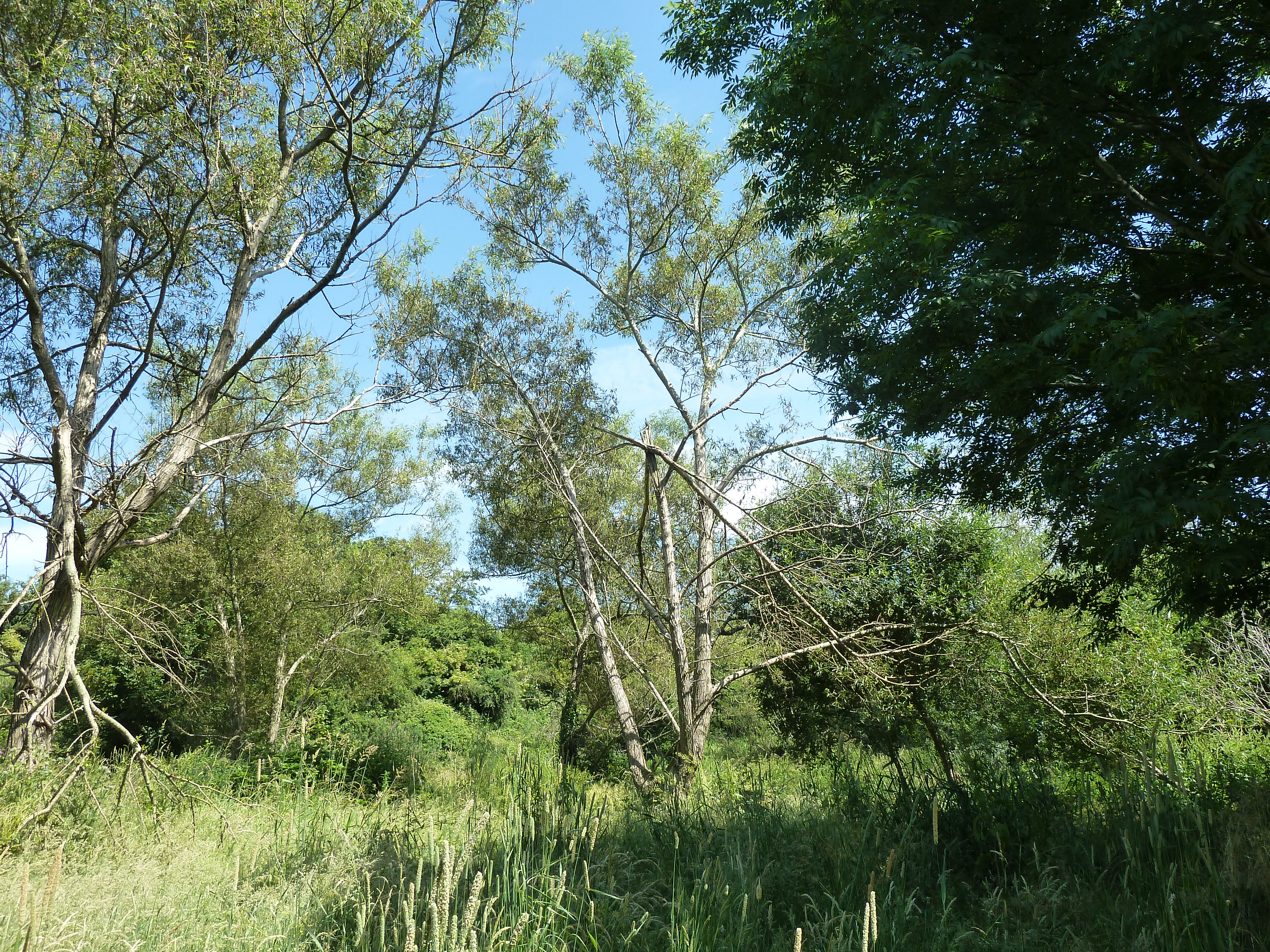
Habitat.
