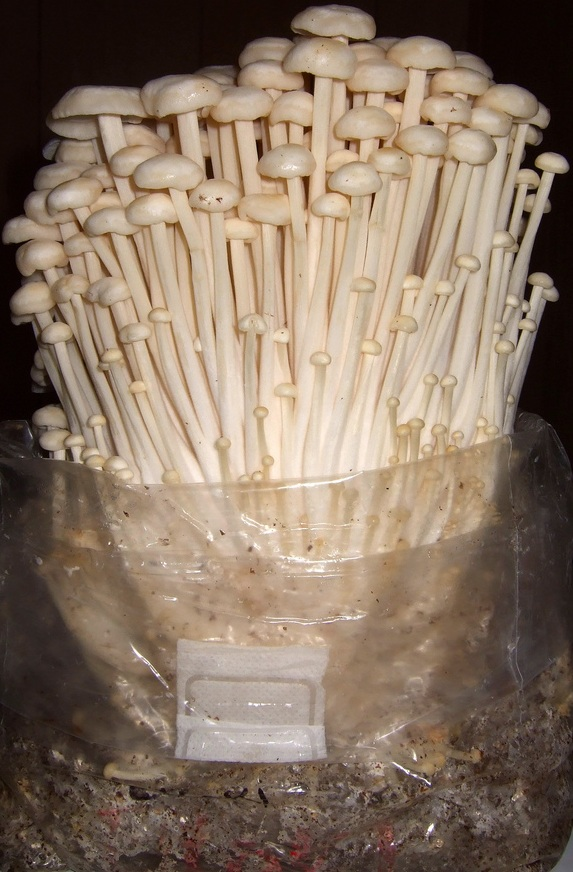
- Cultivated Flammulina filiformis

Scientific classification
- Kingdom: Fungi
- Division: Basidiomycota
- Class: Agaricomycetes
- Order: Agaricales
- Family: Physalacriaceae
- Genus: Flammulina
- Species: F. filiformis

Binomial name
- Flammulina filiformis (Z.W. Ge, X.B. Liu & Zhu L. Yang) P.M. Wang, Y.C. Dai, E. Horak & Zhu L. Yang (2018)

Synonyms
- Flammulina velutipes var. filiformis Z.W. Ge, X.B. Liu & Zhu L. Yang (2015); Flammulina velutipes var. himalayana Z.W. Ge, Kuan Zhao & Zhu L. Yang (2015)

= Flammulina filiformis =

Enokitake

Species of edible mushroom

Flammulina filiformis
- Mycological characteristics
- Gills on hymenium
- Cap is convex or flat
- Stipe is bare
- Spore print is white
- Ecology is saprotrophic
- Edibility is choice

Flammulina filiformis, commonly called enoki mushroom or enokitake (kanji: 榎茸), is a species of agaric (gilled mushroom) in the family Physalacriaceae. Until recently, the species was considered to be conspecific with the European Flammulina velutipes, but DNA sequencing has shown that the two are distinct.

It is widely cultivated as an edible mushroom in East Asia, where it is included in Japanese and Chinese cuisine.

== Taxonomy ==
Flammulina filiformis was originally described from China in 2015 as a variety of F. velutipes, based on internal transcribed spacer sequences. Further molecular research using a combination of different sequences has shown that F. filiformis and F. velutipes are distinct and should be recognized as separate species.

=== Etymology ===
In Japanese, the mushroom is known as enoki-take or enoki-dake, both meaning "hackberry mushroom". This is because it is often found growing at the base of hackberry (enoki) trees.

In Mandarin Chinese, the mushroom is called jīnzhēngū (金針菇 "gold needle mushroom") or jīngū (金菇 "gold mushroom").

In Korean, it is called paengi beoseot (팽이버섯) which means "mushroom planted near catalpa". In Vietnamese it is known as nấm kim châm. In India it is called futu.

== Description ==
The basidiocarps are agaricoid and grow in clusters. The cap is convex at first, flattening as it expands, measuring up to 4.5 cm (1 3/4 in) across. The cap surface is smooth, viscid when damp, ochraceous yellow to yellow-brown. The lamellae (gills) are cream to yellowish white. The stipe (stem) is up to 8.5 mm (1/2 in) long, smooth, pale yellow at the apex, yellow-brown to dark brown towards the base, and lacking a ring. The spore print is white. The spores are inamyloid, smooth, and ellipsoid to cylindrical, measuring about 5 to 7 by 3 to 3.5 μm.

There is a significant difference in appearance between wild and cultivated basidiocarps. Cultivated enokitake are not exposed to light, resulting in white or pallid fruit bodies with long stipes and small caps.

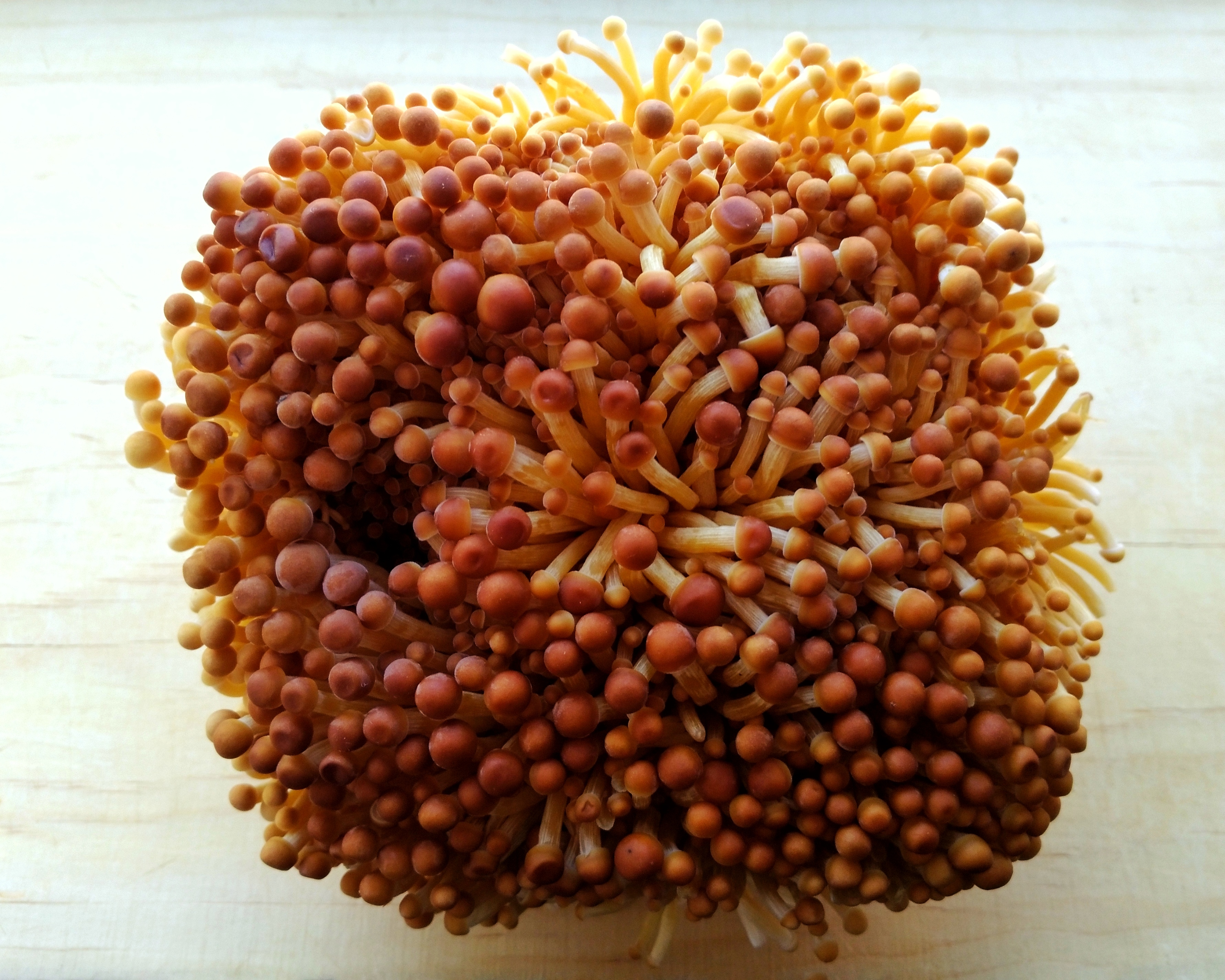
Brown variety

== Distribution and habitat ==
The fungus is found on dead wood of Betula platyphylla, Broussonetia papyrifera, Dipentodon sinicus, Neolitsea sp., Salix spp, and other broad-leaved trees. It grows naturally in China, Korea, and Japan.

Mushrooms, enoki, raw
Nutritional value per 100 g (3.5 oz)
- Energy: 153 kJ (37 kcal)
- Carbohydrates: 7.8 g
- Sugars: 0.2 g
- Dietary fiber: 2.7 g
- Fat: 0.3 g
- Protein: 2.7 g
Vitamins and minerals
Vitamins	Quantity %DV^{†}
Thiamine (B1)	19% 0.23 mg
Riboflavin (B2)	15% 0.2 mg
Niacin (B3)	46% 7.3 mg
Pantothenic acid (B5)	28% 1.4 mg
Vitamin B6	6% 0.1 mg
Folate (B9)	12% 48 μg
Vitamin C	0% 0 mg
Minerals	Quantity %DV^{†}
Calcium	0% 0 mg
Iron	7% 1.2 mg
Magnesium	4% 16 mg
Phosphorus	8% 105 mg
Potassium	12% 359 mg
Selenium	4% 2.2 μg
Sodium	0% 3 mg
Zinc	6% 0.65 mg
- Other constituents: Quantity
- Water: 88 g
- Link to USDA Database entry
- ^{†}Percentages estimated using US recommendations for adults, except for potassium, which is estimated based on expert recommendation from the National Academies.

== Nutrition ==
Enoki mushrooms are 88% water, 8% carbohydrates, 3% protein, and contain negligible fat (table). In a reference amount of 100 g (3.5 oz), enoki mushrooms provide 37 calories of food energy, and are a rich source (20% or more of the Daily Value, DV) of niacin (46% DV), and pantothenic acid (28% DV), while supplying moderate amounts of thiamine, riboflavin, folate, and potassium (12-19% DV, table).

== Uses ==
Flammulina filiformis has been cultivated in China since 800 AD. Commercial production in China was estimated at 1.57 million tonnes per annum in 2010, with Japan producing an additional 140,000 tonnes per annum. The fungus can be cultivated on a range of simple lignocellulosic substrates including sawdust, wheat straw, and paddy straw. Enokitake are typically grown in the dark, producing pallid fruitbodies having long and narrow stipes with undeveloped caps. Exposure to light results in more normal, short-stiped, colored fruitbodies.

=== As food ===
The mushroom is widely eaten in East Asia. Cultivated F. filiformis is sold both fresh and canned. The fungus has a crisp texture and can be refrigerated for approximately one week. It is a common ingredient for soups, especially in East Asian cuisine, but can be used for salads and other dishes.

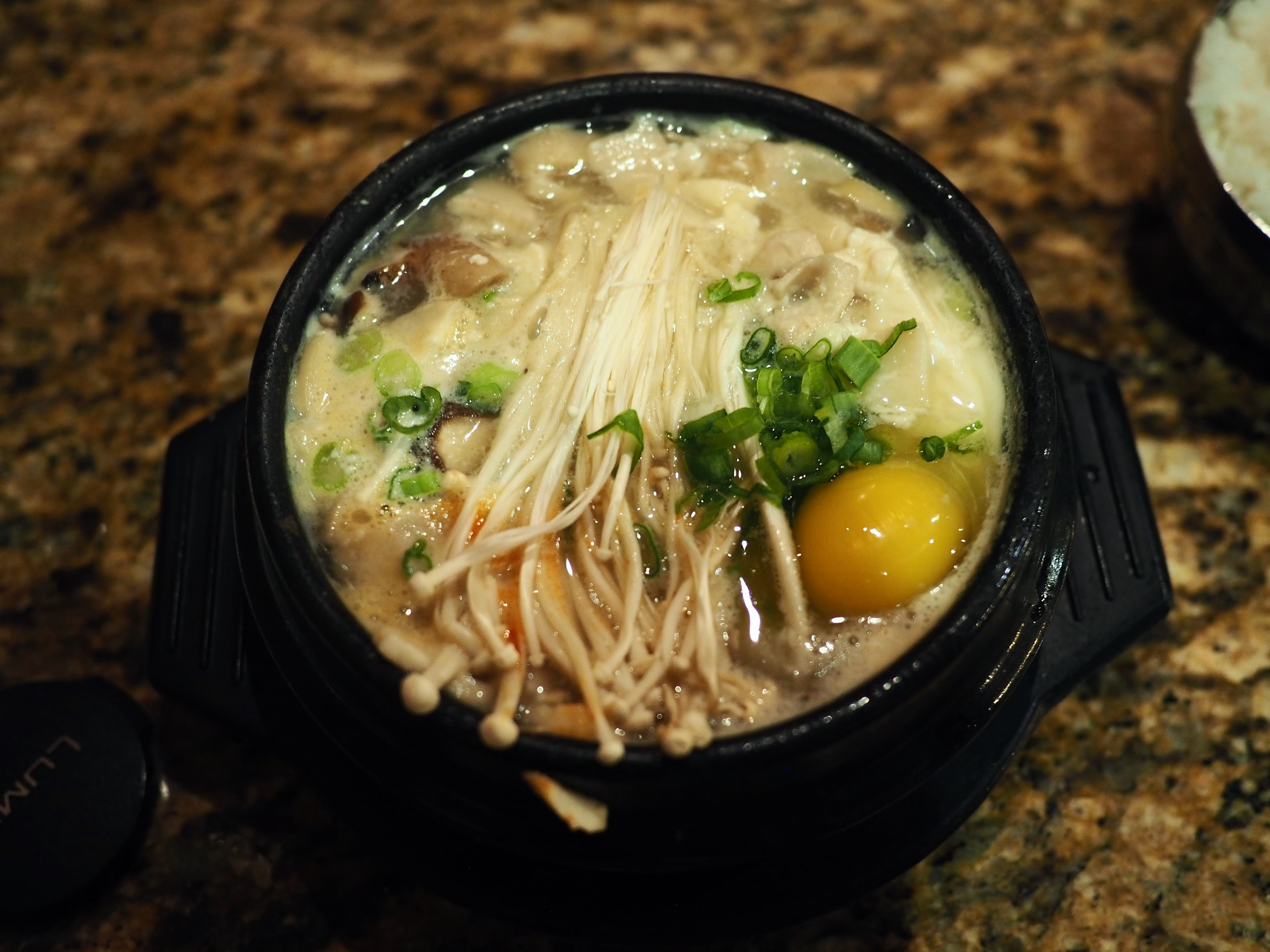
In Korean jjigae (stew)

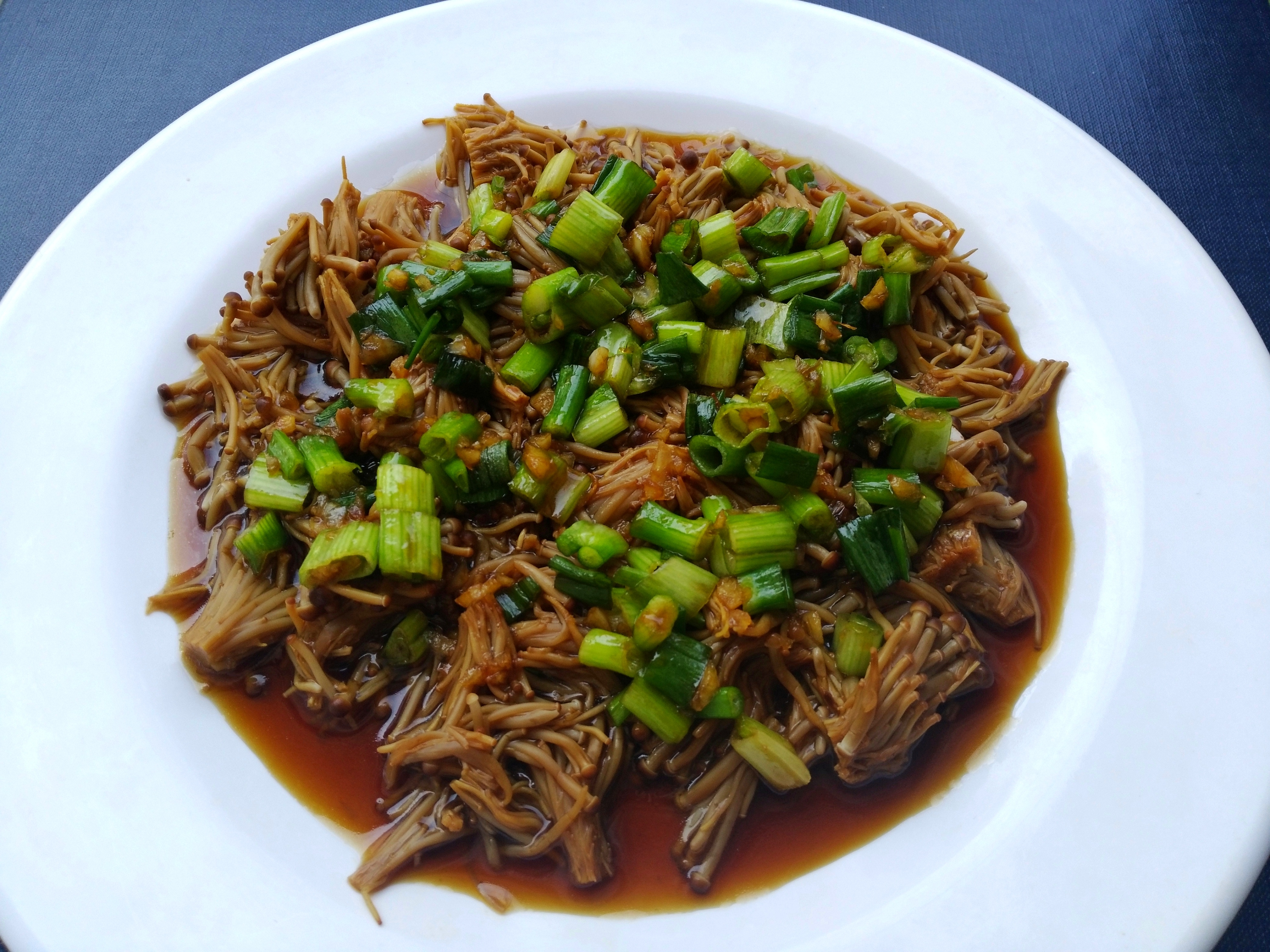
In Korean bokkeum (stir-fry)

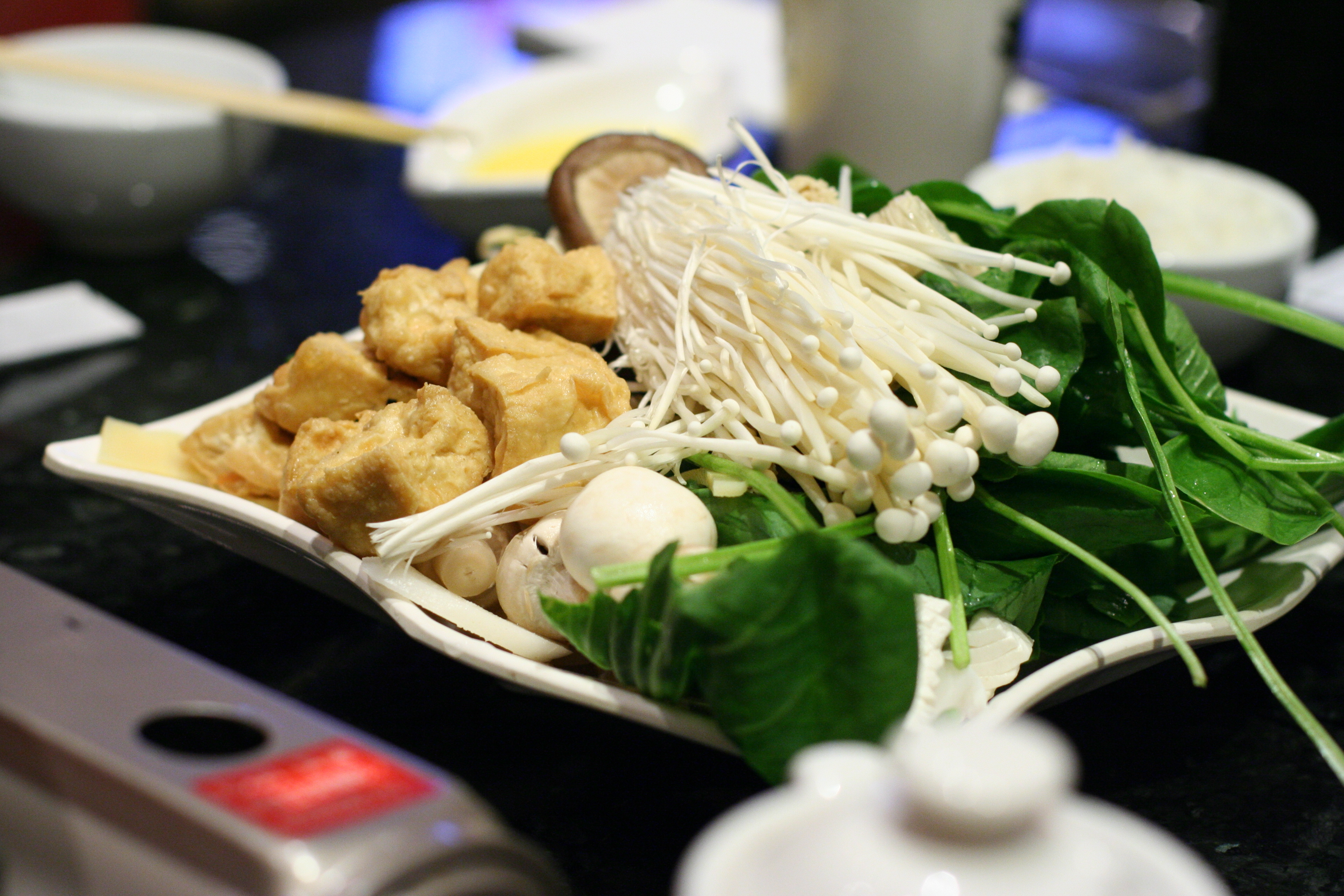
In Japanese sukiyaki

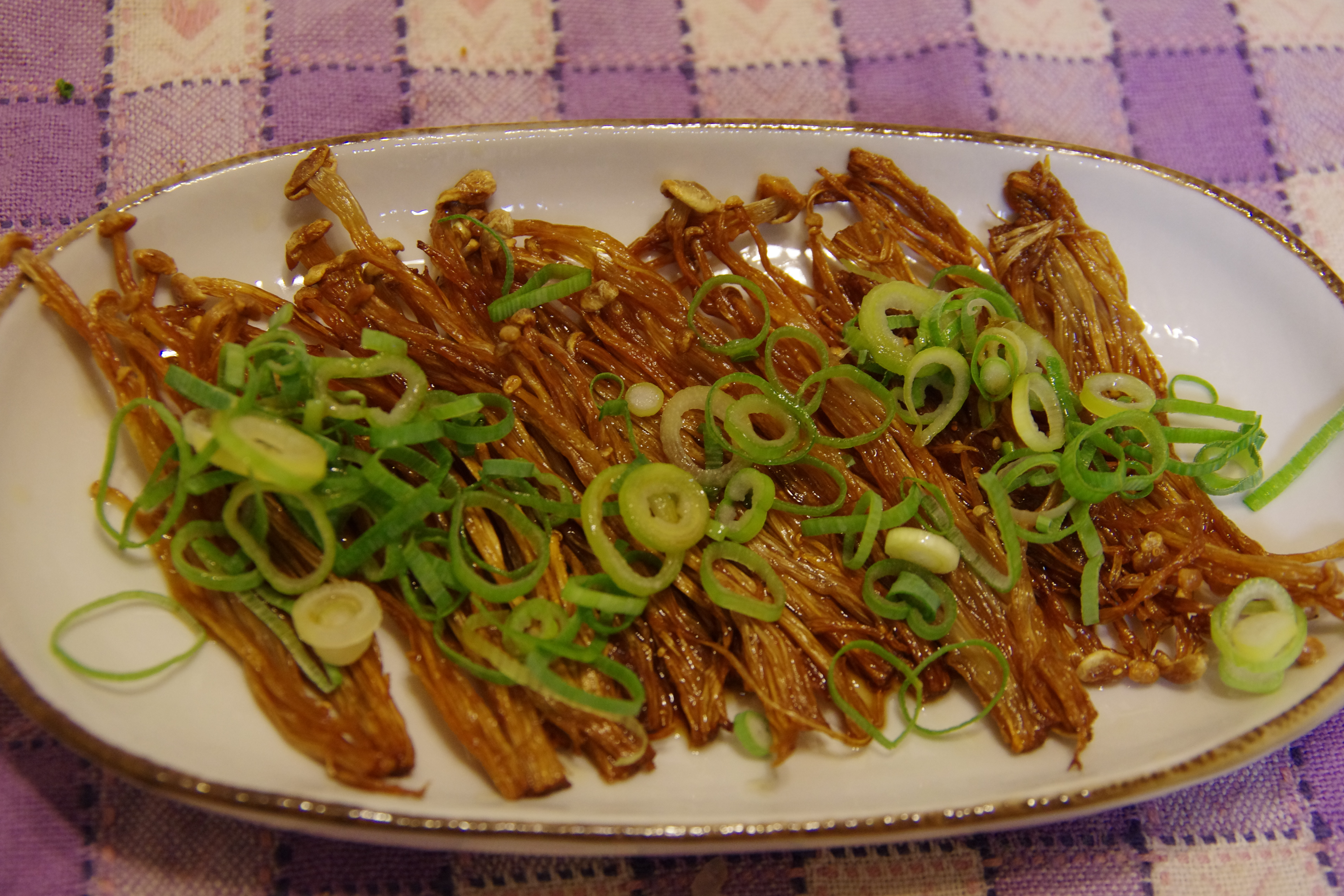
Grilled

=== Improving storage ===
Flammulina filiformis extract can be added to whipped cream. It was observed that this measure helps to slow down the development of ice crystals, which would maintain the quality of whipped cream longer while storing it in a frozen state.

=== Nutritionally improved meat products ===
Flammulina filiformis are an object of interest in current research for their potential to enhance food products and animal feed by using the stem waste.

Studies indicate that the addition of F. filiformis stem waste powder to meat products can improve nutritional quality by increasing dietary fiber and ash content. This ingredient also enhances tenderness, inhibits lipid and protein oxidation, and extends shelf life, without negatively impacting the texture or flavor of the meat products.

=== Feed additive for livestock ===
Natural feed additives have become more important in livestock farming. Following this trend, F. filiformis was checked for livestock health and production efficiency improving properties. There are studies showing that the use of Enoki mushroom residue as a feed additive offers several benefits for livestock. It enhances antioxidant enzyme activity, and improves animal digestibility, hormone levels, and immunity.

The addition of mushroom residue into livestock diet can reduce the feed cost and feed conversion ratio and enhance the meat quality, providing consumers with healthier and higher-quality meat products.

== Cultivation ==
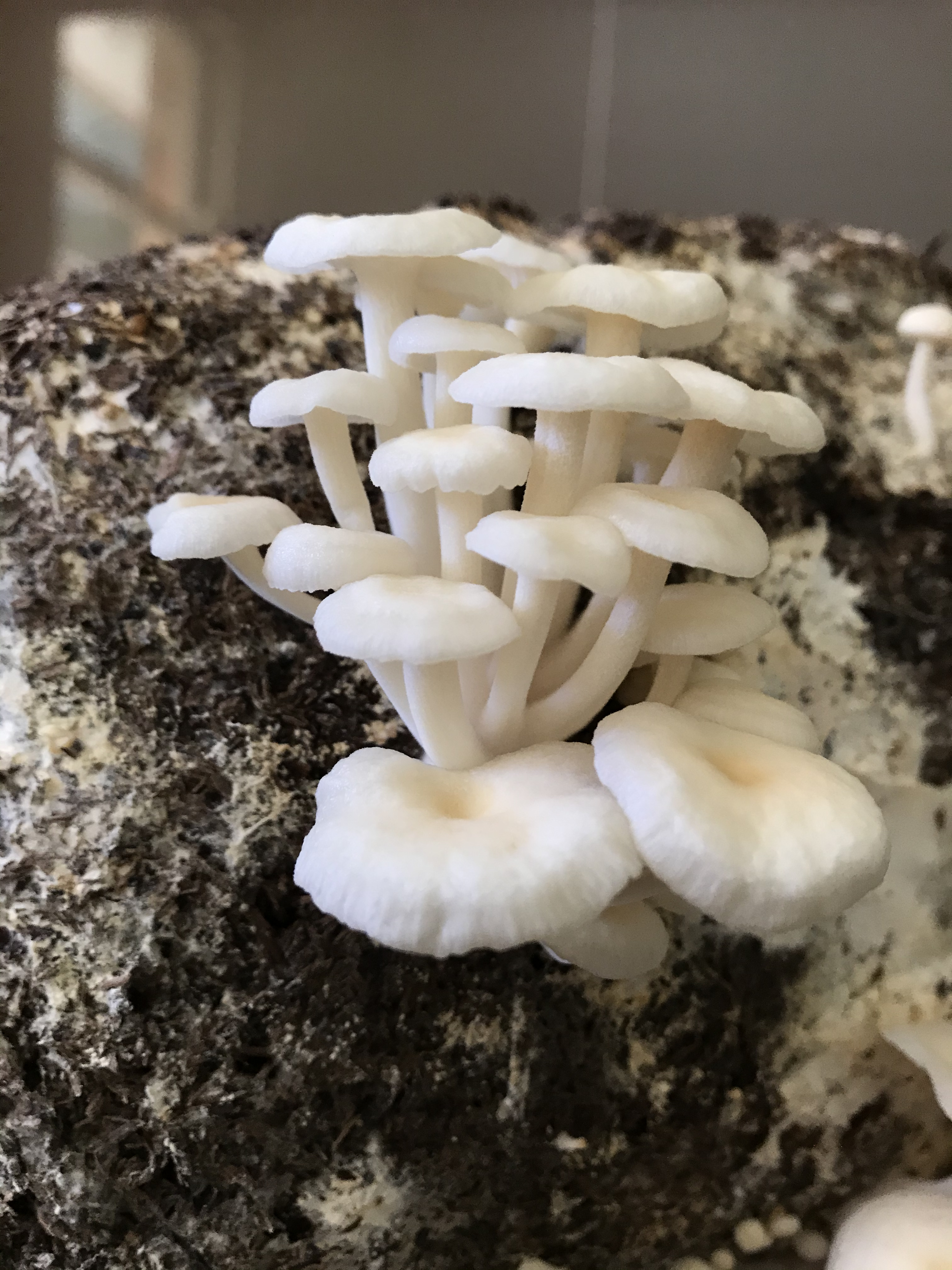
Growing

Flammulina filiformis is commonly cultivated in large-scale factories, where through mechanization, over 300,000 tons of F. filiformis can be harvested per year.

=== Indoor cultivation ===
Flammulina filiformis thrives in a warm, moist environment during the incubation phase, with substrate temperatures ranging from 18 to 25 °C (64 to 77 °F). F. filiformis needs significantly cooler conditions to trigger fruiting. Pinning is triggered at temperatures ranging between 7 and 10 °C (45 and 50 °F), and the optimal temperature range for fruiting is 10 to 16 °C (50 to 61 °F). As with most fungi, F. filiformis demands elevated humidity levels—95 to 100% during pinning and 85 to 95% during fruiting.

The ideal size to harvest enoki mushrooms is generally recommended to be about 5–10 cm (2–4 in) long. At that time, the cap should still be tightly closed and the stem should be long and sturdy. If people grow enoki mushrooms at home, they can use a sharp knife or scissors to snip off the mushroom cluster at the base of the stem where it meets the growing medium. It's important to remove both the mushrooms and any remaining mycelium (the white, thread-like structures) from the growing medium during harvest. This helps prevent decaying, which could negatively impact future mushroom growth.

=== Post-harvest handling ===
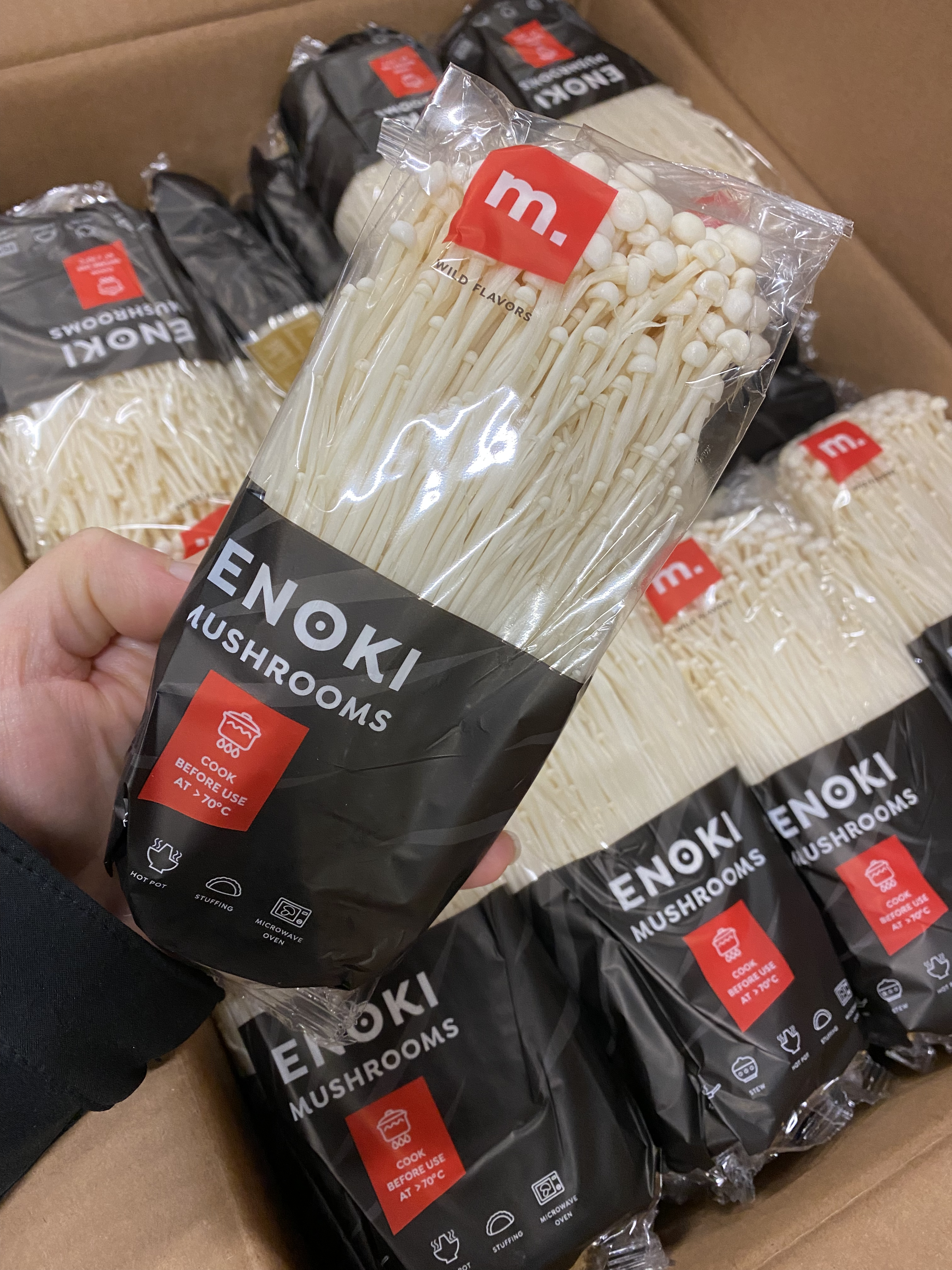
Packaged

Flammulina filiformis have thin, delicate stems that need to be handled with care to prevent damage. The following steps are for reference. First, gently brush off any dirt or substrate with a soft brush or a damp cloth. After cleaning, separate the mushroom clusters into individual stems for easier cooking and presentation.

=== Storage ===
Flammulina filiformis should be kept at temperatures between 7-10 °C (44.6-50 °F) for optimal freshness. For brief storage (fewer than 7 days), a temperature interval of 1–2 °C (34-36 °F) with 90–98% relative humidity is advised.

=== Proneness to Listeria ===
Flammulina filiformis have the potential to be contaminated with Listeria monocytogenes, which is why disease control centers recommend cooking the mushroom prior to consumption.

The Singapore Food Agency advise people to do the following to ensure food security when consuming F. filiformis:

1. Enoki mushrooms should never be eaten raw
2. Instead, make sure to cook the mushrooms properly before eating them
3. If there are cooking directions at hand, make sure to follow them
4. Enoki mushrooms should be stored at cold temperatures to ensure a slower growth of microbes. This should be done even if the packaging is not opened yet
5. Uncooked enoki mushroom should be stored separately to avoid cross-contamination

== See also ==
- Shiitake
