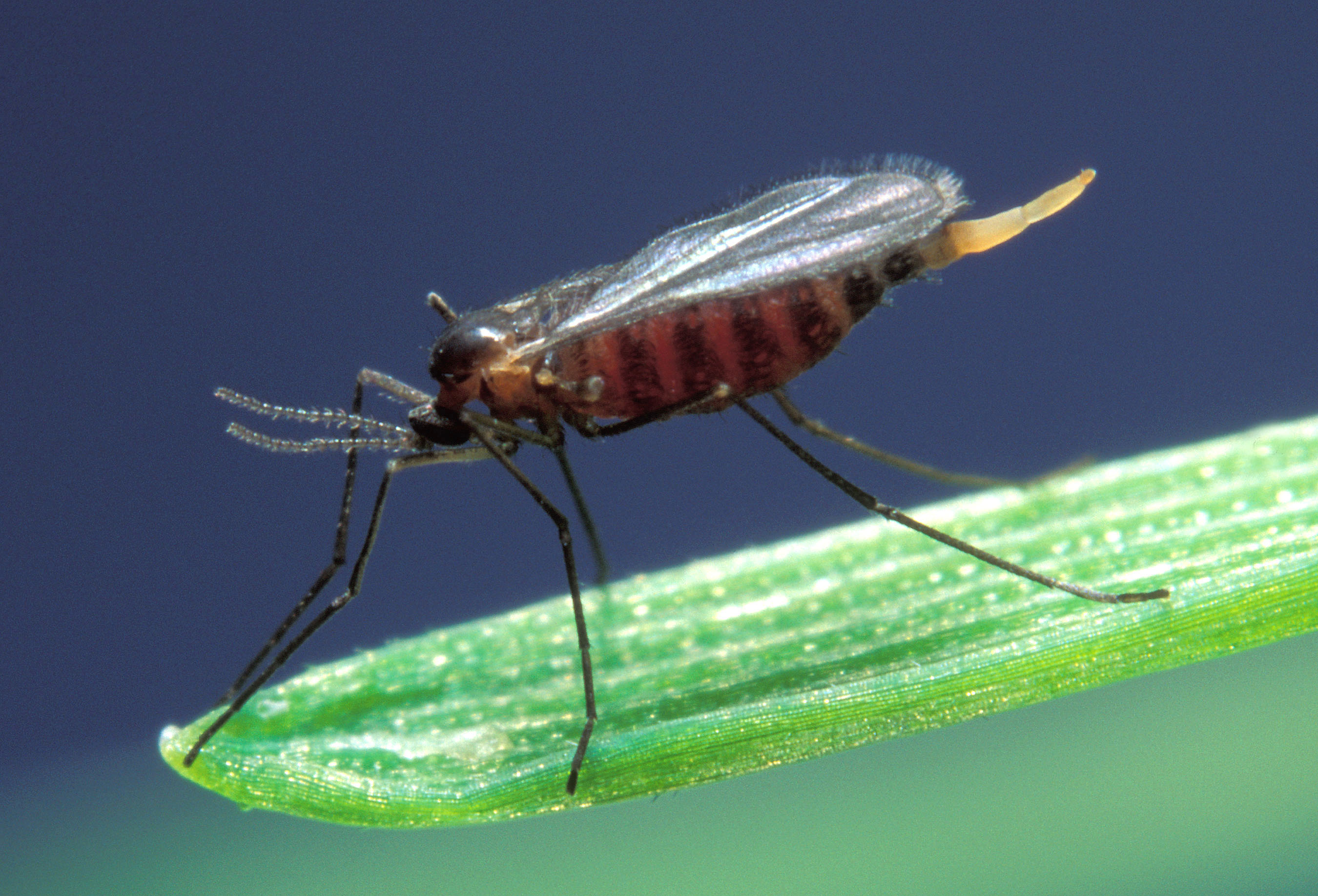
- The Hessian fly (Mayetiola destructor, Cecidomyiidae)

Scientific classification
- Kingdom: Animalia
- Phylum: Arthropoda
- Clade: Pancrustacea
- Class: Insecta
- Order: Diptera
- Infraorder: Bibionomorpha
- Superfamily: Sciaroidea

Synonyms
- Mycetophiliformia Amorim & Rindal, 2007

= Sciaroidea =

Superfamily of flies

Sciaroidea is a superfamily in the infraorder Bibionomorpha. There are about 16 families and more than 15,000 described species in Sciaroidea. Most of its constituent families are various gnats (e.g. fungus gnats).

== Description ==
As nematoceran flies, sciaroid adults generally have long segmented antennae, while their larvae have a well-developed head and mouthparts.

Aside from this, sciaroids vary in appearance. For example, Sciaridae adults have each eye extended dorsally to form an "eye bridge", a feature not found in related families. Cecidomyiidae adults have a distinctive reduced wing venation, while their larvae are atypical for nematoceran larvae in having a very small head capsule.

== Ecology ==
Most fungus gnats (Sciaroidea excluding Cecidomyiidae) live in forests with their larvae occurring in fungi, dead wood and soil. There are some which live in wetlands such as fens. Several genera of Sciaridae and Mycetophilidae may reach high abundances in damp buildings with wet organic matter.

Some species of Sciaridae and Cecidomyiidae are among the rare Diptera that spend their entire lives in soil. These are wingless as adults.

Sciaroid larvae typically feed on fungi but there are some which form plant galls (many Cecidomyiidae) or prey on other invertebrates (Keroplatidae).

== Phylogeny ==
A 2016 molecular phylogenetic analysis confirmed that Sciaroidea is a monophyletic group and should include both Cecidomyiidae and Ditomyiidae.

== Families ==
These 15 families belong to the superfamily Sciaroidea:

- Bolitophilidae Meigen, 1818
- Cecidomyiidae Newman, 1835 – gall midges and wood midges, sometimes excluded from Sciaroidea
- Diadocidiidae Winnertz, 1863
- Ditomyiidae Kylin, 1919
- Keroplatidae Rondani (incl. Lygistorrhinidae Edwards, 1925) – long-beaked & predatory fungus gnats
- Mycetophilidae Newman, 1834
- Rangomaramidae Jaschhof and Didham, 2002 – long-winged fungus gnats
- Sciaridae Billberg, 1820 – dark-winged fungus gnats
- † Antefungivoridae Rohdendorf, 1938
- † Archizelmiridae Rohdendorf, 1962
- † Eoditomyiidae
- † Mesosciophilidae
- † Paraxymyiidae Rohdendorf, 1946
- † Pleciofungivoridae Rohdendorf, 1946
- † Protopleciidae Rohdendorf, 1946
