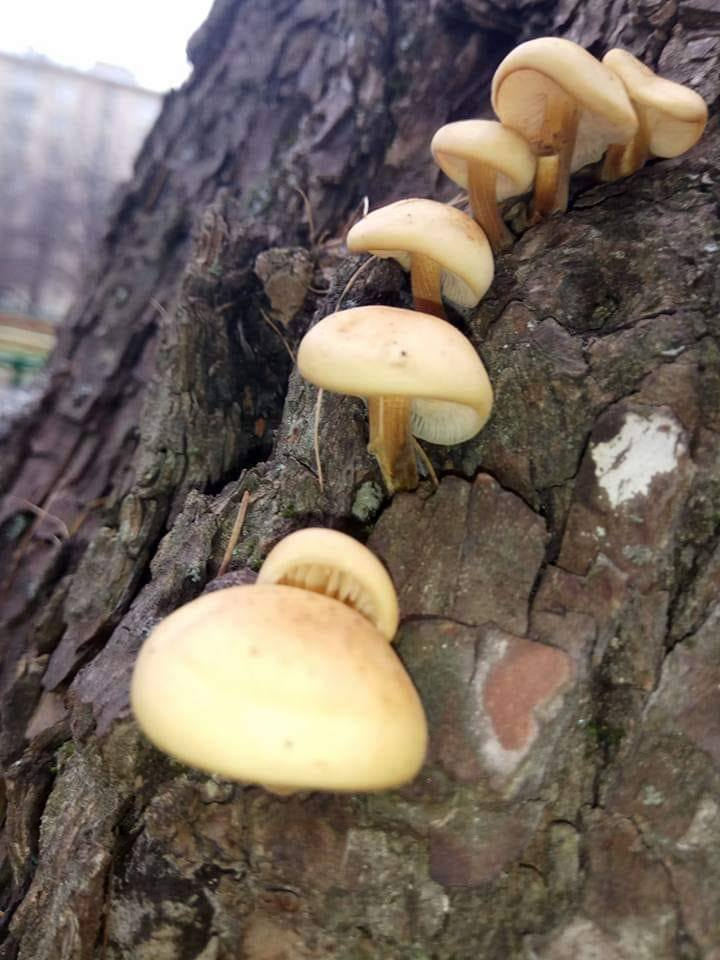
- Flammulina populicula on poplar tree

Scientific classification
- Domain: Eukaryota
- Kingdom: Fungi
- Division: Basidiomycota
- Class: Agaricomycetes
- Order: Agaricales
- Family: Physalacriaceae
- Genus: Flammulina
- Species: F. populicola

Binomial name
- Flammulina populicola Redhead & R.H.Petersen

= Flammulina populicola =

Species of fungus

Flammulina populonica is an edible winter mushroom. It differs from closely related species Flammulina velutipes by being slightly larger in size and having a thicker stem. It grows on wood of quaking aspen and other poplars (members of the genus Populus).

It is found mainly in northern Europe and North America.

Culinarily, it is used in the same way as F. velutipes. It requires cooking and is often used in soups.
