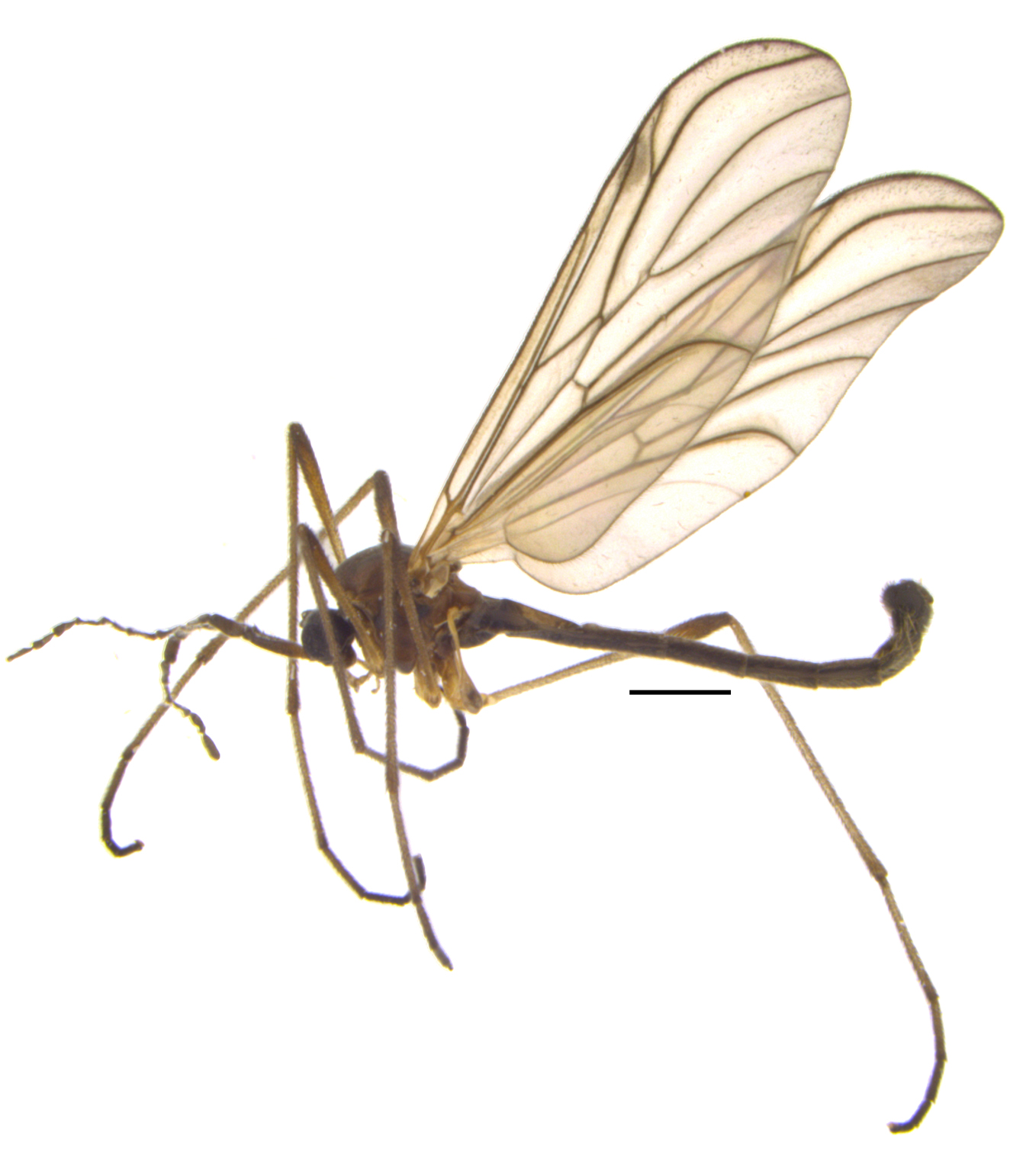
- Hesperinus ninae male

Scientific classification
- Kingdom: Animalia
- Phylum: Arthropoda
- Class: Insecta
- Order: Diptera
- Infraorder: Bibionomorpha
- Superfamily: Bibionoidea
- Family: Hesperinidae
- Genus: Hesperinus; Walker, 1848

Type species
- Hesperinus brevifrons Walker, 1848

= Hesperinus =

Hesperinus Temporal range: Eocene–Recent

Genus of flies

Hesperinus is a genus of flies and the sole genus in the relict family Hesperinidae belonging to the nematoceran infraorder Bibionomorpha. There are about 8 known species, nearly all from the Palaearctic region with one each from the Nearctic and Neotropical regions. Three fossil species from Eocene Baltic amber have been described. These flies have long 12-segmented antennae, legs and abdomen and males have well-developed wings while females have a short one. Little is known, but most species have been collected near streams in woodlands.

== Species ==
- Hesperinus brevifrons Walker, 1848
- Hesperinus conjugens Schiner, 1868
- Hesperinus cuspidistylus Hardy & Takahashi, 1960
- †Hesperinus electrus Skartveit, 2009
- Hesperinus graecus Papp, 2010
- Hesperinus heeri (Heyden & Heyden, 1865)
- †Hesperinus hyalopterus Skartveit, 2009
- Hesperinus imbecillus (Loew, 1858)
- †Hesperinus macroulatus Skartveit, 2009
- Hesperinus nigratus Okada, 1934
- Hesperinus ninae Papp & Krivosheina, 2010
- Hesperinus rohdendorfi Krivosheina & Mamaev, 1967
