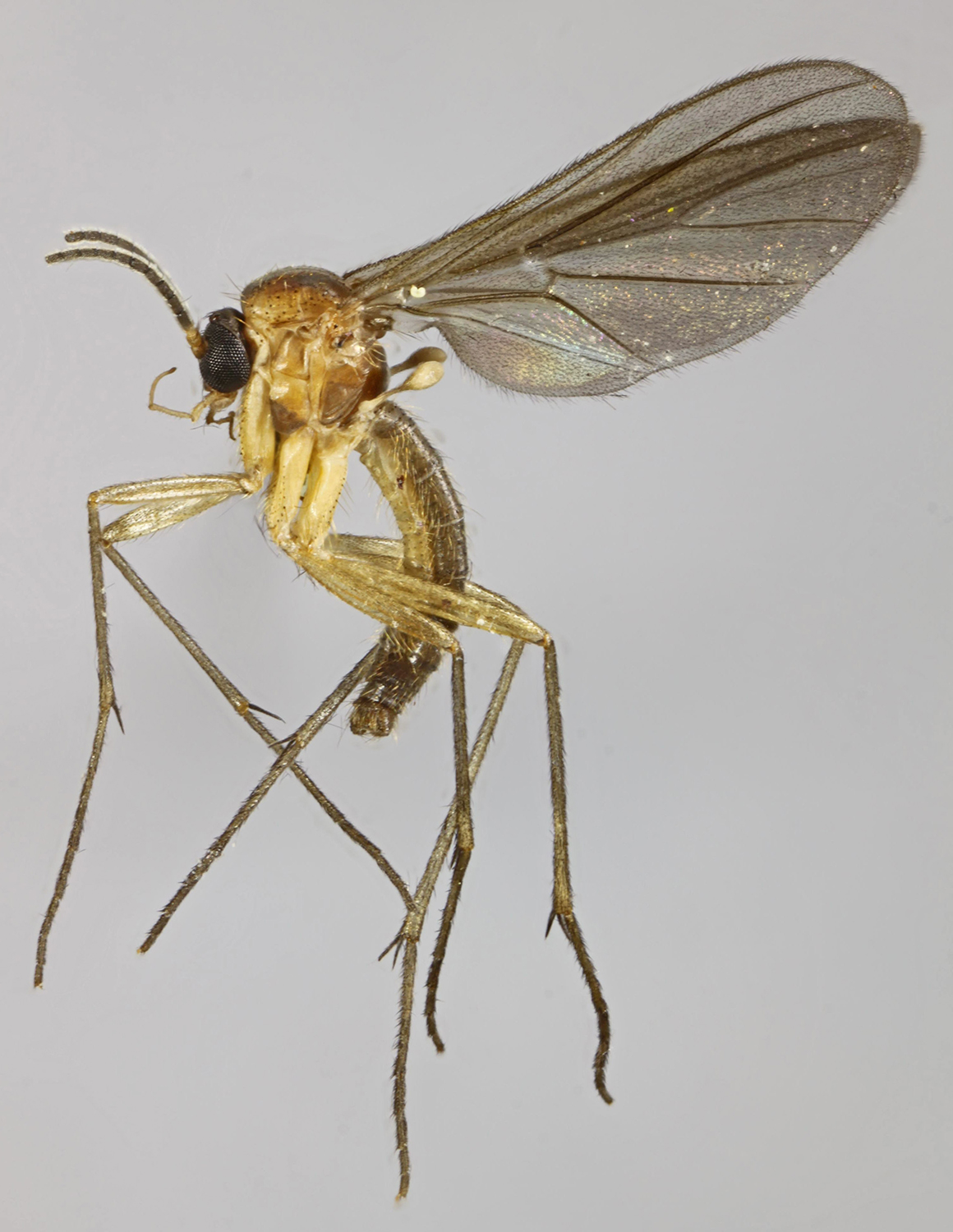
- Diadocidia ferruginosa

Scientific classification
- Kingdom: Animalia
- Phylum: Arthropoda
- Clade: Pancrustacea
- Class: Insecta
- Order: Diptera
- Suborder: Nematocera
- Infraorder: Bibionomorpha
- Superfamily: Sciaroidea
- Family: Diadocidiidae; Winnertz, 1863

Genera
- Diadocidia; †Docidiadia

Diversity
- 23 species

= Diadocidiidae =

Diadocidiidae Temporal range: Cenomanian–Recent

Family of flies

The Diadocidiidae are a family of flies (Diptera), containing one extant genus with over 20 species and one extinct genus. Diadocidiidae are found worldwide, except in Africa and Antarctica. They are usually considered close to the Keroplatidae, Bolitophilidae, and Ditomyiidae, and used to be included in the Mycetophilidae. They are woodland flies, found in shaded places in forests or near streams. The larvae spin silken tubes under bark or in dead logs, and feed on hymenium of Polyporaceae fungi. The average body length for adults is around 2.5–5.6 mm.

== Genera ==
- Diadocidia Ruthe 1831 Eocene-Present
- †Docidiadia Blagoderov and Grimaldi 2004 Burmese amber, Myanmar, Cenomanian
