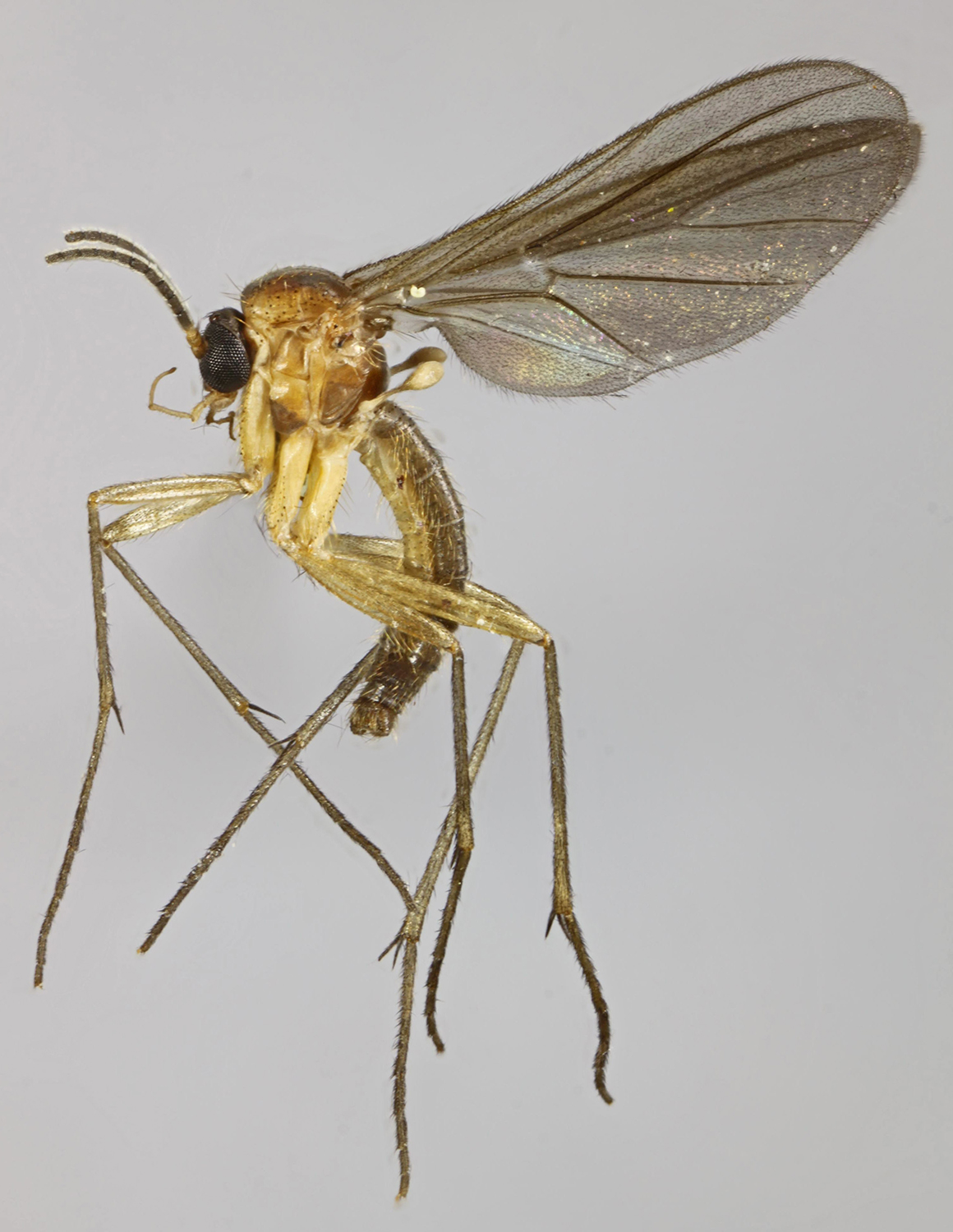
- Diadocidia ferruginosa North Wales

Scientific classification
- Domain: Eukaryota
- Kingdom: Animalia
- Phylum: Arthropoda
- Class: Insecta
- Order: Diptera
- Family: Diadocidiidae
- Genus: Diadocidia; Ruthe, 1831

Type species
- Diadocidia flavicans Ruthe, 1831

Synonyms
- Aclada Loew, 1850; Macroneura Rondani, 1856; Macronevra Macquart, 1834; Palaeodocidia Sasakawa, 2004; Adidocidia Laštovka & Matile, 1972; Taidocidia Papp & Sevcik, 2005

= Diadocidia =

Genus of flies

Diadocidia is a genus of fungus gnats in the family Diadocidiidae.

== Species ==
- D. borealis Coquillett, 1900
- D. bruneicola Ševčik, 2005
- D. cizeki Ševčik, 2003
- D. ferruginosa (Meigen, 1830)
- D. fissa Zaitzev, 1994
- D. flavicans Ruthe, 1831
- D. furnacea Chandler, 1994
- D. globosa Papp & Ševčik, 2005
- D. halopensis Ševčik, 2003
- D. hybrida Jaschhof & Jaschhof, 2007
- D. ishizakii (Sasakawa, 2004)
- D. macrosetigera Jaschhof & Jaschhof, 2007
- D. nigripalpis Edwards, 1940
- D. papua Ševčik, 2003
- D. parallela Evenhuis, 1994
- D. parallela Loew, 1850
- D. queenslandensis Jaschhof & Jaschhof, 2007
- D. setistylus Papp, 2003
- D. sevciki Papp, 2005
- D. similis Jaschhof & Jaschhof, 2007
- D. sinica Wu, 1995
- D. spinosula Tollet, 1948
- D. stanfordensis Arnaud & Hoyt, 1956
- D. sulawesiana Ševčik, 2005
- D. trispinosa Polevoi, 1996
- D. valida Mik, 1874
- D. winthemi (Macquart, 1834)
