= Cramptonomyia =

Scientific classification
- Domain: Eukaryota
- Kingdom: Animalia
- Phylum: Arthropoda
- Class: Insecta
- Order: Diptera
- Family: Pachyneuridae
- Genus: Cramptonomyia; Alexander, 1931
- Species: C. spenceri

Binomial name
- Cramptonomyia spenceri Alexander, 1931

Genus of flies

Cramptonomyia is a genus of gnats in the family Pachyneuridae. There is one described species in Cramptonomyia, C. spenceri.
