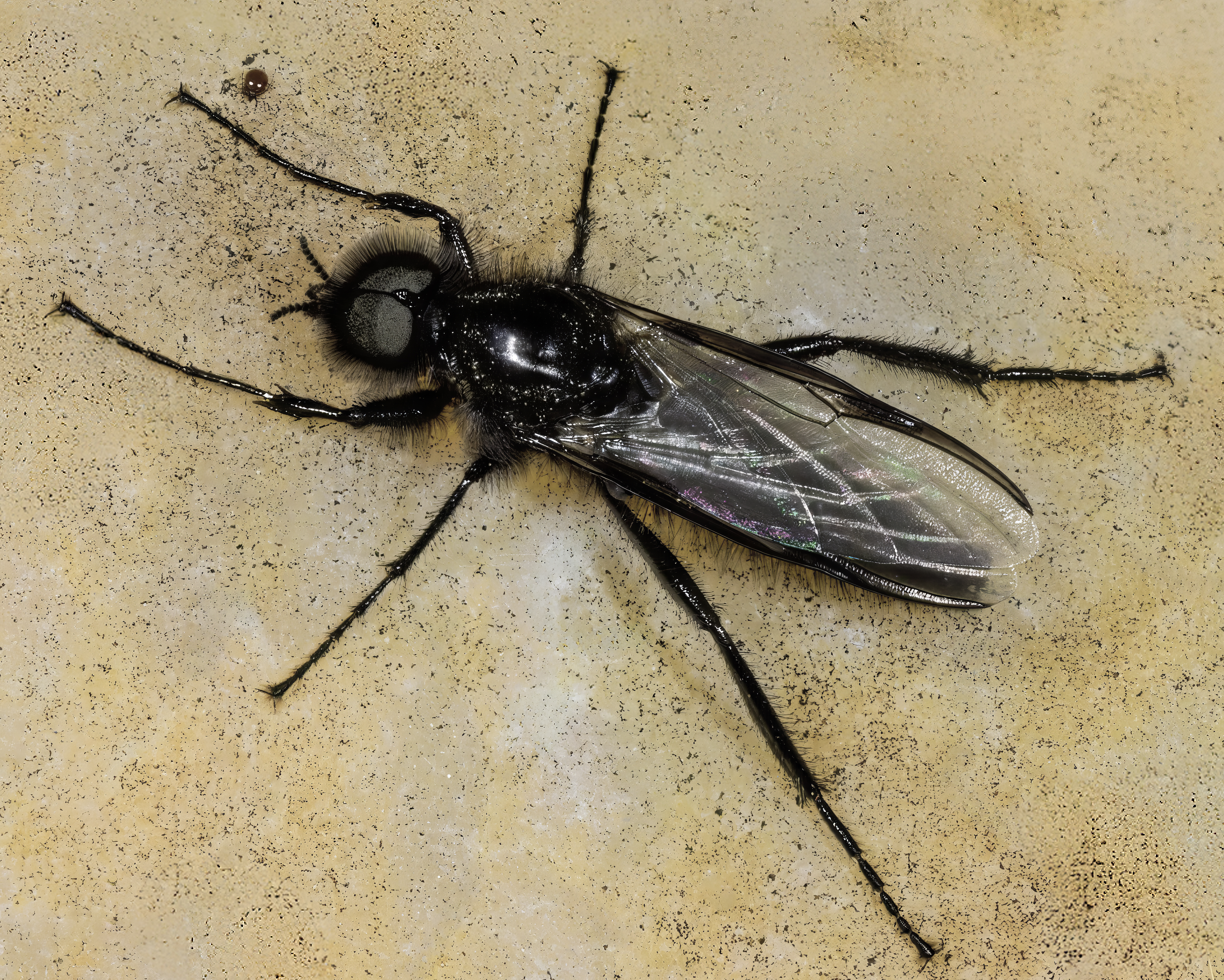
- March fly, Bibio marci

Scientific classification
- Kingdom: Animalia
- Phylum: Arthropoda
- Clade: Pancrustacea
- Class: Insecta
- Order: Diptera
- Suborder: Nematocera
- Infraorder: Bibionomorpha
- Superfamily: Bibionoidea

= Bibionoidea =

Superfamily of flies

The Bibionoidea are a superfamily within the order Diptera. The following families are included within the Bibionoidea:

- Bibionidae – March flies
- Hesperinidae
