= Archizelmiridae =

Archizelmiridae Temporal range: Bathonian–Turonian

Scientific classification
- Kingdom: Animalia
- Phylum: Arthropoda
- Clade: Pancrustacea
- Class: Insecta
- Order: Diptera
- Superfamily: Sciaroidea
- Family: †Archizelmiridae; Rhodendorf, 1962

Genera
- See text

Extinct family of flies

Archizelmiridae is an extinct family of flies, known from the Jurassic and Cretaceous periods. It belongs to the Sciaroidea, and has suggested to have a close relationship with Sciaridae.

== Genera ==
- †Archimelzira Grimaldi et al. 2003 New Jersey amber, Late Cretaceous (Turonian)
- †Archizelmira Rohdendorf 1962 Itat Formation, Russia, Middle Jurassic (Bathonian) Karabastau Formation, Kazakhstan, Middle-Late Jurassic (Callovian/Oxfordian) Shar Teeg, Mongolia, Late Jurassic (Tithonian) Zaza Formation, Russia, Early Cretaceous (Aptian)
- †Burmazelmira Grimaldi et al. 2003 Spanish amber, Escucha Formation, Early Cretaceous (Albian), Burmese amber, Myanmar, Late Cretaceous (Cenomanian)
- †Zelmiarcha Grimaldi et al. 2003 Lebanese amber, Early Cretaceous (Barremian)
