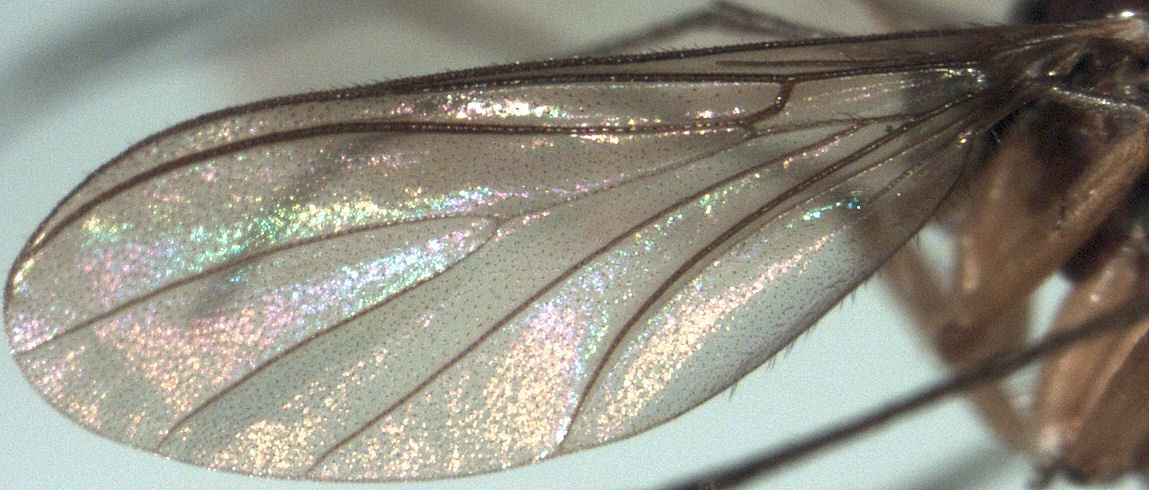
- Anisotricha wing

Scientific classification
- Kingdom: Animalia
- Phylum: Arthropoda
- Class: Insecta
- Order: Diptera
- Superfamily: Sciaroidea
- Family: Rangomaramidae; Jaschhof & Didham, 2002

Subfamilies and genera
- Chiletrichinae; ?Anisotricha Chandler, 2002; Chiletricha Chandler, 2002; Eratomyia Amorim & Rindal, 2007; Insulatricha Jaschhof, 2004; Kenyatricha Chandler, 2002; ?Nepaletricha Chandler, 2002; Rhynchoheterotricha Freeman, 1960; Rangomaraminae; Rangomarama Jaschhof & Didham, 2002; Heterotrichinae; Heterotricha Loew, 1850; Ohakuneinae; Cabamofa Jaschhof, 2005; Colonomyia Colless, 1963; Ohakunea Tonnoir & Edwards, 1927; Rogambara Jaschhof, 2005

= Rangomaramidae =

Family of flies

Rangomaramidae is a family of flies in the infraorder Bibionomorpha. The family, members of which are known as long-winged fungus gnats, was erected in 2002 by Jaschhof and Didham to include five new species of flies in the genus Rangomarama from New Zealand. The family was then expanded to include several other genera from across the world which were formerly classified as Sciaroidea incertae sedis, but preliminary studies show that the broad family is non-monophyletic.
