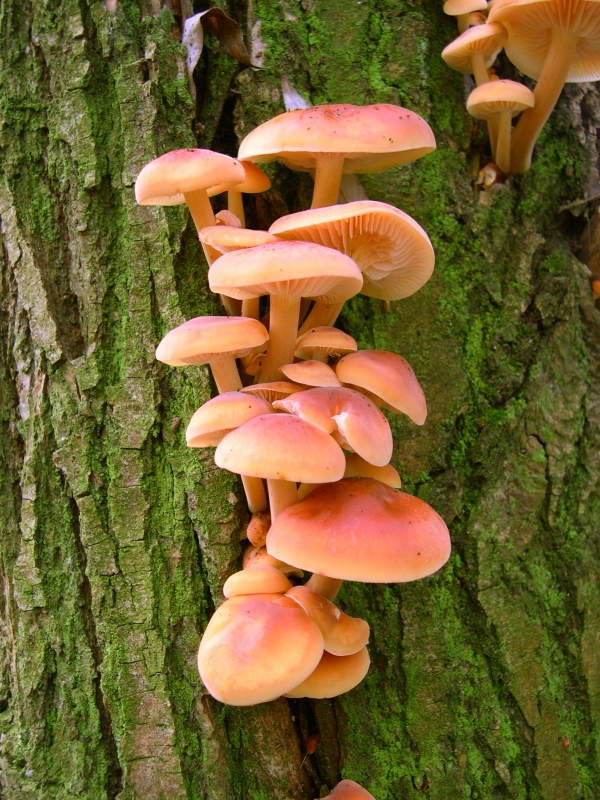
- Flammulina velutipes

Scientific classification
- Kingdom: Fungi
- Division: Basidiomycota
- Class: Agaricomycetes
- Order: Agaricales
- Family: Physalacriaceae
- Genus: Flammulina; P.Karst. (1891)

Type species
- Flammulina velutipes (Curtis) Singer (1951)

Synonyms
- Collybidium Earle (1909); Myxocollybia Singer (1936)

= Flammulina =

Genus of fungi

Flammulina is a genus of fungi in the family Physalacriaceae. The genus, widespread in temperate regions, has been estimated to contain 10 species.

== List of species ==
As of December 2023, Index Fungorum lists the following species in Flammulina:

Image	Name	Taxon Author	Year
	Flammulina callistosporioides	(Singer) Singer	1964
	Flammulina cephalariae	Pérez-Butrón & Fern.-Vic.	2007
	Flammulina elastica	(Sacc.) Redhead & R.H. Petersen	1999
	Flammulina fennae	Bas	1983
	Flammulina ferrugineolutea	(Beeli) Singer	1969
	Flammulina filiformis (enokitake)	(Z.W. Ge, X.B. Liu & Zhu L. Yang) P.M. Wang, Y.C. Dai, E. Horak & Zhu L. Yang	2018
	Flammulina finlandica	P.M. Wang, Y.C. Dai, E. Horak & Zhu L. Yang	2018
	Flammulina glutinosa	G. Stev.	1964
	Flammulina lupinicola	(Redhead & R.H. Petersen) C. Hahn	2016
	Flammulina mexicana	Redhead, Estrada & R.H. Petersen	2000
	Flammulina ononidis	Arnolds	1977
	Flammulina populicola	Redhead & R.H. Petersen	1999
	Flammulina rossica	Redhead & R.H. Petersen	1999
	Flammulina similis	E. Horak	1980
	Flammulina stratosa	Redhead, R.H. Petersen & Methven	1999
	Flammulina velutipes (velvet shank)	(Curtis) Singer	1951
	Flammulina yunnanensis	Z.W. Ge & Zhu L. Yang	2008
