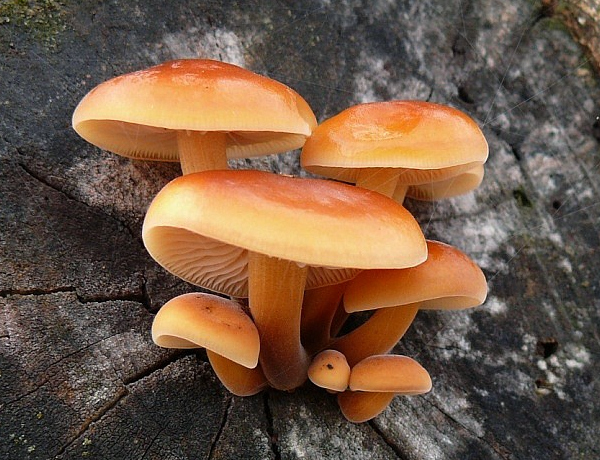

Scientific classification
- Kingdom: Fungi
- Division: Basidiomycota
- Class: Agaricomycetes
- Order: Agaricales
- Family: Physalacriaceae
- Genus: Flammulina
- Species: F. velutipes

Binomial name
- Flammulina velutipes (Curtis) Singer (1951)

Synonyms
- Agaricus velutipes Curtis (1782)

= Flammulina velutipes =

Species of edible mushroom

Flammulina velutipes
- Mycological characteristics
- Gills on hymenium
- Cap is convex
- Hymenium is adnate
- Stipe is bare
- Spore print is white
- Ecology is saprotrophic
- Edibility is choice

Flammulina velutipes, the velvet foot, velvet stem, velvet shank or wild enoki, is a species of gilled mushroom in the family Physalacriaceae. The species occurs in Europe and North America.

== Taxonomy ==
The species was originally described from England by botanist William Curtis in 1782 as Agaricus velutipes. It was transferred to the genus Flammulina by Rolf Singer in 1951.

Until recently, F. velutipes was considered to be conspecific with the Asian F. filiformis, cultivated for food as "enokitake" or "golden needle mushroom", but DNA sequencing shows that the two are distinct.

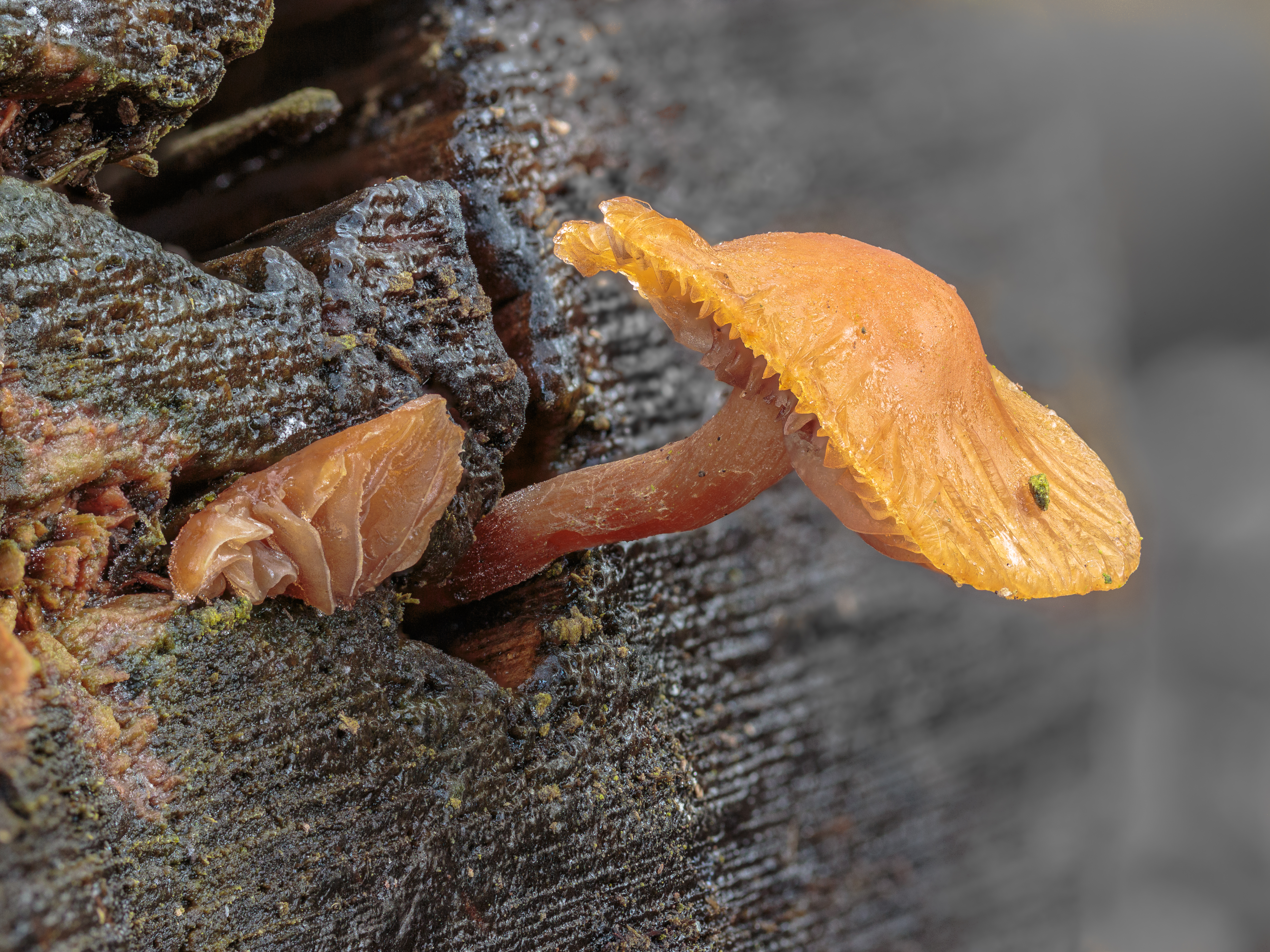
Flammulina velutipes on the fracture of the saw cut of a willow branch.

== Description ==
Flammulina velutipes grows up to 10 centimetres (4 in) tall and wide. The cap is light orange, darker toward the center. The stem fades to a darker color near the base. The flesh of the cap is yellow, while that of the stem is brown. The odour and flavour are pleasant. The spore print is white.

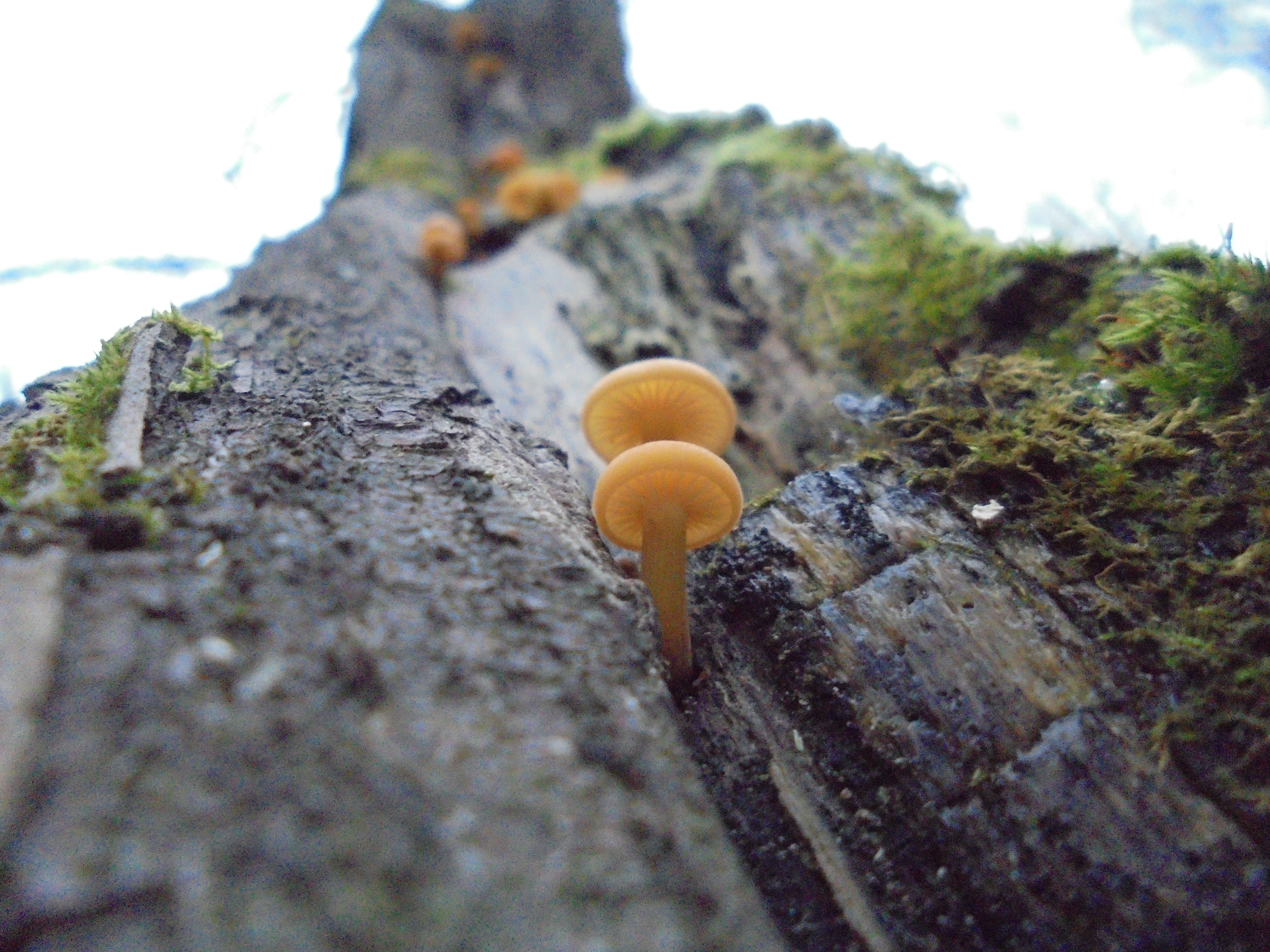
Young specimens on a tree

=== Similar species ===
It may resemble F. populicola and F. lupinicola. Marasmiellus dichrous and Xeromphalina tenuipes are also similar.

== Distribution and habitat ==
The species occurs throughout Europe (October to February) and in North America (through May in the east).

Velvet shank is saprotrophic especially on dead or dying elm, as well as ash, beech and oak.

== Uses ==
The fleshy caps can be sliced and cooked (ideally with the skin removed), or dried and ground into seasoning.

== See also ==
- Collybia
