= List of Trichocera species =

This is a list of 119 species in Trichocera, a genus of winter crane flies in the family Trichoceridae.

== Trichocera species ==
- Trichocera abieticola Alexander, 1935^{c g}
- Trichocera alpina Stary, 2000^{c g}
- Trichocera alticola Alexander, 1935^{c g}
- Trichocera altipons Starý, 1998^{c g}
- Trichocera andorrensis Krzeminska, 2000^{c g}
- Trichocera annulata Meigen, 1818^{i c g b}
- Trichocera antennata Stary, 1999^{c g}
- Trichocera arctica Lundstrom, 1915^{i c g}
- Trichocera arisanensis Alexander, 1935^{c g}
- Trichocera arnaudi Pratt, 2003^{c g}
- Trichocera auripennis Alexander, 1960^{c g}
- Trichocera banffi Pratt, 2003^{c g}
- Trichocera barraudi Krzeminska, 2002^{c g}
- Trichocera basidens Starý, 1998^{c g}
- Trichocera bellula Alexander, 1961^{c g}
- Trichocera bifurcata Nakamura & Saigusa, 1997^{c g}
- Trichocera bilobata Stary, 1999^{c g}
- Trichocera bimacula Walker, 1848^{i c g b}
- Trichocera bisignata Alexander, 1959^{c g}
- Trichocera bituberculata Alexander, 1924^{i c g}
- Trichocera borealis Lackschewitz, 1934^{i c g}
- Trichocera brevicornis Alexander, 1952^{i c g}
- Trichocera brumalis Fitch, 1847^{i c g}
- Trichocera calva Stary, 1999^{c g}
- Trichocera candida Dahl, 1976^{c g}
- Trichocera carpathica Stary & Martinovsky, 1996^{c g}
- Trichocera chaetopyga Nakamura & Saigusa, 1996^{c g}
- Trichocera colei Alexander, 1919^{i c g}
- Trichocera columbiana Alexander, 1927^{i c g}
- Trichocera corallifera Nakamura & Saigusa, 1997^{c g}
- Trichocera cordata Nakamura & Saigusa, 1997^{c g}
- Trichocera crassicauda Nakamura & Saigusa, 1996^{c g}
- Trichocera dahlae Mendl, 1971^{g}
- Trichocera excilis Dahl, 1967^{i c g}
- Trichocera fattigiana Alexander, 1952^{i c g}
- Trichocera fernaldi Alexander, 1927^{i}
- Trichocera forcipula Nielsen, 1920^{c g}
- Trichocera garretti Alexander, 1927^{i c g b}
- Trichocera geigeri Stary & Krzeminska, 2000^{c g}
- Trichocera gigantea (Dahl, 1967)^{c g}
- Trichocera glacialis Alexander, 1936^{c g}
- Trichocera hiemalis (De Geer, 1776)^{i c g}
- Trichocera hirta Stary & Martinovsky, 1996^{c g}
- Trichocera hyaloptera Alexander, 1949^{i}
- Trichocera hypandrialis Nakamura & Saigusa, 1997^{c g}
- Trichocera idahoensis Pratt, 2003^{c g}
- Trichocera imanishii (Tokunaga, 1935)^{c}
- Trichocera implicata Dahl, 1976^{c g}
- Trichocera inexplorata (Dahl, 1967)^{c g}
- Trichocera irina Krzeminska, 1996^{c g}
- Trichocera japonica Matsumura, 1915^{c g}
- Trichocera kotejai Krzeminska, 1992^{c g}
- Trichocera lackschewitzi Lantsov, 1987^{c g}
- Trichocera lantsovi Krzeminska, 1996^{c g}
- Trichocera latilobata Alexander, 1938^{c g}
- Trichocera latipons Podenas, 2017^{g}
- Trichocera limpidipennis Loew, 1873^{c g}
- Trichocera longisetosa Alexander, 1927^{i}
- Trichocera lutea Becher, 1886^{i c g}
- Trichocera mackenziei (Dahl, 1967)^{c g}
- Trichocera maculipennis Meigen, 1818^{i c g}
- Trichocera major Edwards, 1921^{c g}
- Trichocera marocana ^{g}
- Trichocera mendli Dahl, 1976^{c g}
- Trichocera mexicana Alexander, 1946^{c g}
- Trichocera michali Krzeminska, 1999^{c g}
- Trichocera minuta Tokunaga, 1938^{c g}
- Trichocera mirabilis Alexander, 1934^{c g}
- Trichocera mishmi Krzeminska, 2002^{c g}
- Trichocera monochroma (Harris, 1835)^{i}
- Trichocera monstrosa Nakamura & Saigusa, 1997^{c g}
- Trichocera montium Stary, 2002^{c g}
- Trichocera mutica Dahl, 1966^{c g}
- Trichocera nipponensis Tokunaga, 1938^{c g}
- Trichocera obtusa Stary & Martinovsky, 1996^{c g}
- Trichocera ocellata Walker, 1856^{c g}
- Trichocera oregelationis (Linnaeus, 1758)^{i g}
- Trichocera pallens Alexander, 1954^{i c g}
- Trichocera pappi Krzeminska, 2003^{c g}
- Trichocera parva Meigen, 1804^{c g}
- Trichocera percincta Alexander, 1961^{c g}
- Trichocera pictipennis Alexander, 1930^{c g}
- Trichocera polanensis Stary, 2002^{c g}
- Trichocera pubescens Stary & Martinovsky, 1996^{c g}
- Trichocera recondita Stary, 2000^{c g}
- Trichocera rectistylus Starý, 1998^{c g}
- Trichocera regelationis (Linnaeus, 1758)^{c g}
- Trichocera reticulata Alexander, 1933^{c g}
- Trichocera rufescens Edwards, 1921^{c g}
- Trichocera rufulenta Edwards, 1938^{g}
- Trichocera salmani Alexander, 1927^{i c g}
- Trichocera saltator (Harris, 1776)^{c g}
- Trichocera sapporensis Alexander, 1935^{c g}
- Trichocera sardiniensis Petrasiunas, 2009^{c g}
- Trichocera schmidi Alexander, 1959^{c g}
- Trichocera scutellata Say, 1824^{i c g}
- Trichocera setosivena Alexander, 1927^{i c g}
- Trichocera sibirica Edwards, 1920^{c g}
- Trichocera simonyi Mik, 1886^{c g}
- Trichocera skrobli Podenas, 1991^{c g}
- Trichocera sparsa Stary & Martinovsky, 1996^{c g}
- Trichocera superna Alexander, 1961^{c g}
- Trichocera szechwanensis Alexander, 1935^{c g}
- Trichocera tenuicercus Alexander, 1959^{c g}
- Trichocera tenuistylus Stary & Geiger, 1995^{c g}
- Trichocera tetonensis Alexander, 1945^{i c g}
- Trichocera thaleri Stary, 2000^{c g}
- Trichocera thaumastopyga Alexander, 1960^{c g}
- Trichocera ticina Stary & Podenas, 1995^{c g}
- Trichocera transversa Starý, 1998^{c g}
- Trichocera triangularis Alexander, 1968^{c g}
- Trichocera truncata Nakamura & Saigusa, 1997^{c g}
- Trichocera tsutsui Tokunaga, 1938^{c g}
- Trichocera tuberculifera Alexander, 1938^{c g}
- Trichocera unimaculata Yang & Yang, 1995^{c g}
- Trichocera ursamajor Alexander, 1959^{i c g}
- Trichocera variata Alexander, 1961^{c g}
- Trichocera venosa Dietz, 1921^{i}
- Trichocera villosa Stary, 2009^{c g}

Data sources: i = ITIS, c = Catalogue of Life, g = GBIF, b = Bugguide.net
