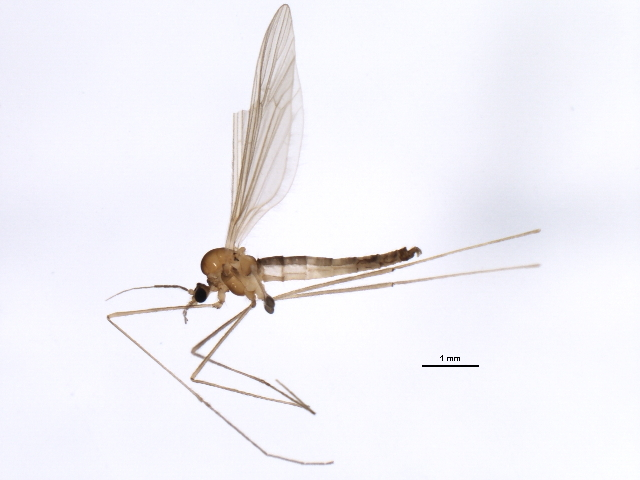

Scientific classification
- Kingdom: Animalia
- Phylum: Arthropoda
- Clade: Pancrustacea
- Class: Insecta
- Order: Diptera
- Family: Trichoceridae
- Genus: Paracladura
- Species: P. trichoptera

Binomial name
- Paracladura trichoptera (Osten Sacken, 1877)

Synonyms
- Trichocera trichoptera Osten Sacken, 1877

= Paracladura trichoptera =

Species of fly

Paracladura trichoptera is a species of winter crane fly in the family Trichoceridae.
