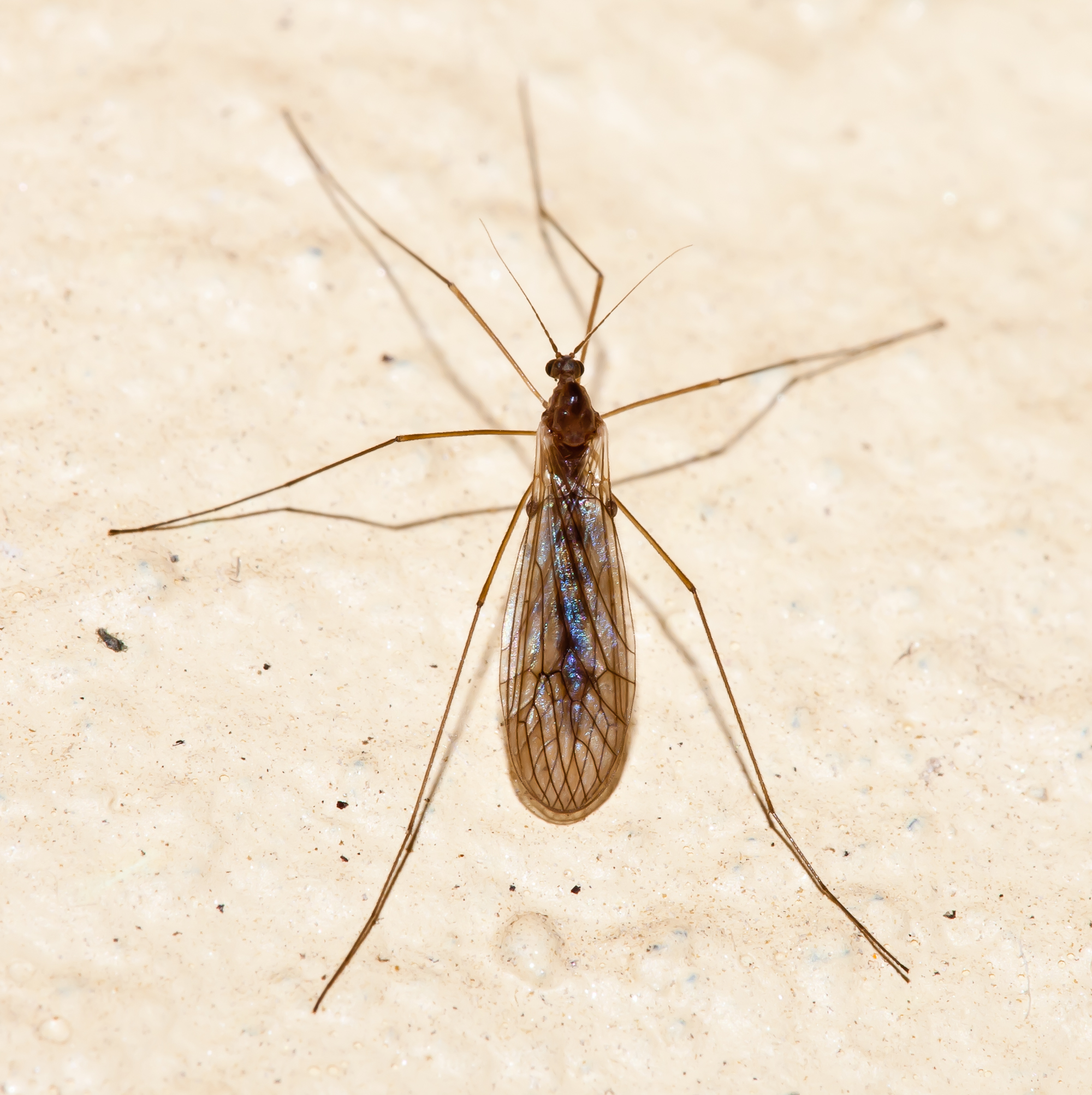

Scientific classification
- Kingdom: Animalia
- Phylum: Arthropoda
- Class: Insecta
- Order: Diptera
- Family: Trichoceridae
- Genus: Trichocera
- Species: T. annulata

Binomial name
- Trichocera annulata Meigen, 1818

Synonyms
- Trichocera multicincta Santos Abreu, 1923

= Trichocera annulata =

Species of fly

Trichocera annulata, commonly known as the winter gnat, is a species of winter crane fly, of the order Diptera. First described by German entomologist Johann Wilhelm Meigen in 1818, it is found in Europe and North America. In North America, it is known from Alaska south to California and in Newfoundland. It is an introduced species in New Zealand.
