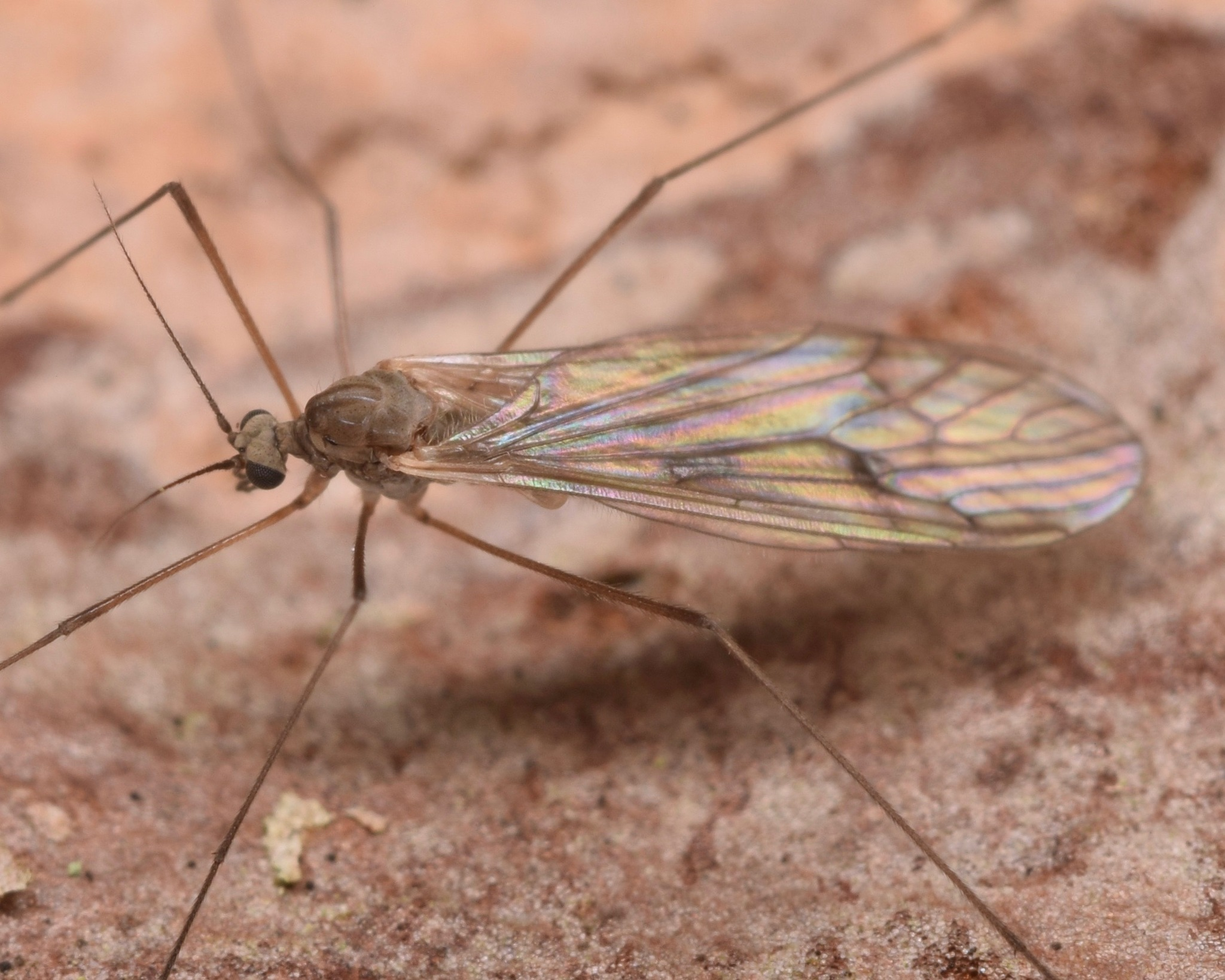

Scientific classification
- Kingdom: Animalia
- Phylum: Arthropoda
- Class: Insecta
- Order: Diptera
- Family: Trichoceridae
- Genus: Trichocera
- Species: T. bimacula

Binomial name
- Trichocera bimacula Walker, 1848

= Trichocera bimacula =

Species of fly

Trichocera bimacula is a species of winter crane flies in the family Trichoceridae.
