= Trichocera garretti =

Scientific classification
- Domain: Eukaryota
- Kingdom: Animalia
- Phylum: Arthropoda
- Class: Insecta
- Order: Diptera
- Family: Trichoceridae
- Genus: Trichocera
- Species: T. garretti

Binomial name
- Trichocera garretti Alexander, 1927

Species of fly

Trichocera garretti is a species of winter crane flies in the family Trichoceridae.
