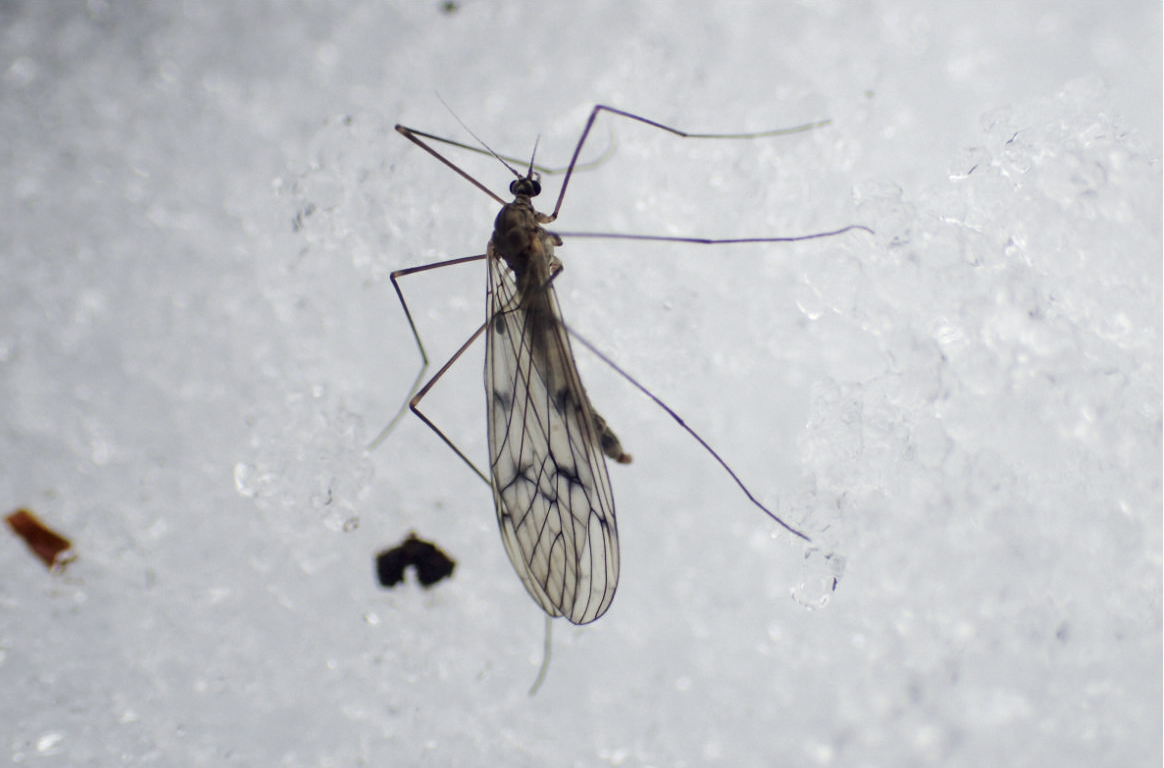

Scientific classification
- Kingdom: Animalia
- Phylum: Arthropoda
- Class: Insecta
- Order: Diptera
- Family: Trichoceridae
- Genus: Trichocera
- Species: T. maculipennis

Binomial name
- Trichocera maculipennis Meigen, 1818

Synonyms
- Palaeopetaurista dubitata Seguy, 1940; Tipula cinerea Fabricius, 1779; Trichocera dubitata (Seguy, 1940); Trichocera versicolor Loew, 1871

= Trichocera maculipennis =

Species of fly

Trichocera maculipennis, commonly known as the winged winter cranefly, is a species of winter crane fly, of the order Diptera. First described by German entomologist Johann Wilhelm Meigen in 1818.

== Description ==
The winged adults typically between 0.5–1 cm in length and appear between autumn and early spring.

There are four larval instars that feed on decaying matter and sometimes faeces. Pupation usually lasts only a few hours.

Similar to other species of Trichocera, winged winter craneflies are adapted to cold environments, but unlike most congeneric species, they seems to be tolerant to both warm and cold climates.

Furthermore, unlike most congeneric species, the larvae of 'Trichocera maculipennis seem to be adapted to survive in semi-liquid or even liquid environments. They likely achieve this by raising the anal end with spiracles above the surface of the substrate. This adaptation was likely a factor enabling them to establish in sewage in stations in Antarctica.

== Distribution ==
Trichocera maculipennis naturally occurs across Europe, North America, Asia, and India, ranging from temperate regions to Arctic regions. It is an introduced species in Antarctica and was first recorded there in the austral summer of 2006/2007. Since then, there were several attempts at eradication from Antarctic stations.
