= Archiphytalmia =

Scientific classification
- Kingdom: Animalia
- Phylum: Arthropoda
- Class: Insecta
- Order: Diptera
- Family: Tephritidae
- Subfamily: Phytalmiinae
- Genus: Archiphytalmia

Genus of flies

Archiphytalmia is a genus of tephritid or fruit flies in the family Tephritidae. It is considered a synonym of Phytalmia.
