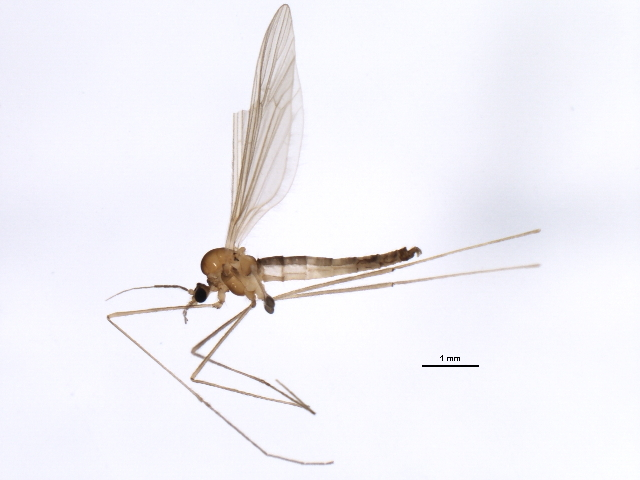
- Paracladura trichoptera

Scientific classification
- Domain: Eukaryota
- Kingdom: Animalia
- Phylum: Arthropoda
- Class: Insecta
- Order: Diptera
- Family: Trichoceridae
- Genus: Paracladura; Brunetti, 1911

= Paracladura =

Genus of flies

Paracladura is a genus of winter crane flies in the family Trichoceridae. There are more than 30 described species in Paracladura.

== Species ==
These 38 species belong to the genus Paracladura:

- Paracladura antipodum (Mik, 1881)
- Paracladura aperta (Alexander, 1922)
- Paracladura chilensis Alexander, 1929
- Paracladura complicata Alexander, 1924
- Paracladura cuneata Alexander, 1928
- Paracladura curtisi Alexander, 1924
- Paracladura decussata Alexander, 1924
- Paracladura dolabella (Krzeminska, 2005)
- Paracladura dorsocompta Yang & Yang, 1995
- Paracladura edwardsi Alexander, 1929
- Paracladura elegans Brunetti, 1911
- Paracladura flavoides Alexander, 1923
- Paracladura gracilis Brunetti, 1911
- Paracladura harrisi Alexander, 1924
- Paracladura howesi (Alexander, 1923)
- Paracladura imanishii Tokunaga, 1938
- Paracladura kumaonensis Alexander, 1959
- Paracladura latipennis Alexander, 1930
- Paracladura lobifera (Alexander, 1922)
- Paracladura lyrifera (Alexander, 1923)
- Paracladura macrotrichiata (Alexander, 1922)
- Paracladura maori (Alexander, 1921)
- Paracladura minuscula Yang, 2003
- Paracladura nipponensis Alexander, 1924
- Paracladura obtusicornis (Alexander, 1922)
- Paracladura oparara Krzeminska, 2001
- Paracladura patagonica Alexander, 1929
- Paracladura pirioni Alexander, 1929
- Paracladura pusilla (Bigot, 1888)
- Paracladura rasnitsyni Krzeminska, 2005
- Paracladura scimitar Alexander, 1969
- Paracladura spicata Alexander, 1969
- Paracladura superbiens Alexander, 1960
- Paracladura trichoptera (Osten Sacken, 1877)
- Paracladura uriarra Krzeminska, 2003
- Paracladura williamsae Krzeminska, 2005
- Paracladura zheana Yang & Yang, 1995
- † Paracladura caucasiana Krzemiska & al., 2009
