= Phytalmia alcicornis =

Scientific classification
- Kingdom: Animalia
- Phylum: Arthropoda
- Clade: Pancrustacea
- Class: Insecta
- Order: Diptera
- Family: Tephritidae
- Genus: Phytalmia
- Species: P. alcicornis

Binomial name
- Phytalmia alcicornis (Saunders, 1861)

Synonyms
- Elaphomyia alcicornis Saunders, 1861

Species of fly

Phytalmia alcicornis also known as moose fly or antler fly, is a species of fruit flies in the genus Phytalmia. This species is native to Papua New Guinea.
