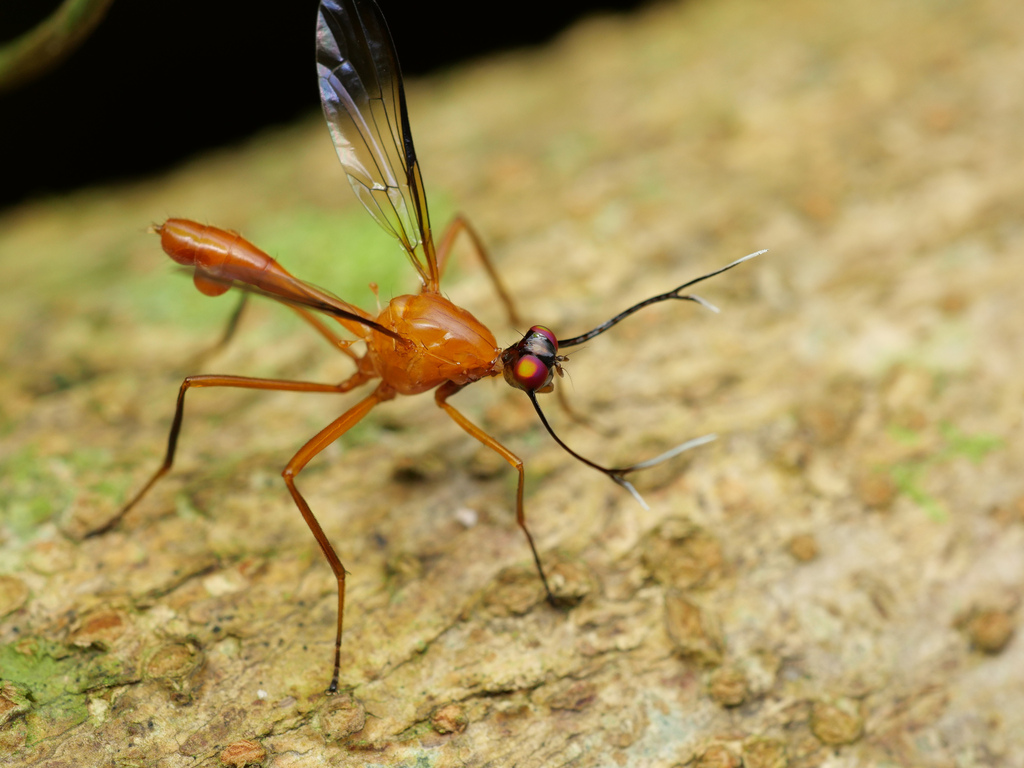

Scientific classification
- Domain: Eukaryota
- Kingdom: Animalia
- Phylum: Arthropoda
- Class: Insecta
- Order: Diptera
- Family: Tephritidae
- Genus: Phytalmia
- Species: P. cervicornis

Binomial name
- Phytalmia cervicornis (Gerstaecker, 1860)

Synonyms
- Elaphomyia cervicornis Saunders, 1861

= Phytalmia cervicornis =

Species of fly

Phytalmia cervicornis also known as stag fly, is a species of fruit flies in the genus Phytalmia. This species is native to Indonesia and Papua New Guinea.
