= Phytalmia mouldsi =

Scientific classification
- Kingdom: Animalia
- Phylum: Arthropoda
- Clade: Pancrustacea
- Class: Insecta
- Order: Diptera
- Family: Tephritidae
- Genus: Phytalmia
- Species: P. mouldsi

Binomial name
- Phytalmia mouldsi McAlpine & Schneider, 1978

Species of fly

Phytalmia mouldsi is in the subfamily Phytalmiinae which includes all of the antlered fruit flies. They were discovered by M. S. Moulds in 1977 and are found only in an isolated rainforest of Australia. Antlered flies, collectively, are notable for their unique mating behavior and the unusual antler-like extensions on the heads of the males.

== Description ==
This species exhibits sexual dimorphism where the females and males look different from one another. The males have red, paddle-shaped, antler-like protrusions on their cheek region that will bend under pressure. The females have no antlers. The males are generally larger than the females and have longer back legs than females. The male characteristics (size, long back legs, antlers) are most likely a result of sexual selection. The longer back legs and larger size give males an advantage when engaging in vertical pushing contests with other males. Females have a smaller rear to foreleg ratio because they do not engage in pushing contests. Antler size is strongly correlated with body size in males. It is hypothesized that antlers developed as size indicators and not as weapons so that the males can avoid wasting time and energy in fights against larger males. Also, males have pronounced spines on their fore femurs that are used to grip females.

== Range ==
Phytalmia mouldsi lives only in one rainforest area on the northeast coast of the Cape York Peninsula of Australia. They lay their eggs and the larvae only eat one specific species of decaying tree: Dysoxylum gaudichaudianum.

== Mating behavior ==
Phytalmia mouldsi uses a resource defense mating system. In this system the males search for a desirable spot for the females to deposit their eggs, and then they guard that spot and await interested females. They will fight off other males who want that spot even while mating with or guarding a female. When a female approaches the male will extend its wings out and keep the female from reaching the oviposit site. The male will then mount the female and latch on behind the wings of the female. This is called a “wing-lock.” The male will hold onto the female in this way during copulation and while the female is ovipositing. This way the male can protect his egg site and the female from other males. If one male challenges another male for his site or his female the males will judge each other and if one is substantially smaller than the other the smaller one will forfeit without a fight. If the males are equally sized, however, they will engage in a shoving contest in which they stand on their hind four legs and shove each other with their epistomal margins of their heads pressed together. This “stilting” has been observed in several other species of fruit flies. Their antlers are not used to jab or push as in some other species of antlered flies; instead the antlers are used more as a tool to judge the size of one’s opponent. If a male is significantly smaller than his opponent it would not be worth his energy to compete and lose. After copulation and ovipositing, the male will release the female from the “wing-lock” and the two will part ways. The male will stay to protect the egg site, sometimes for several days, waiting for more females to come by. The female will likewise search for more oviposition sites and encounter more guarding males.

== Experimentation ==
When antlers were removed or shortened the larger males were still more successful in encounters with other males (larger males won 75 percent of the time). However, larger males with their antlers removed engaged more often in energy-consuming stilting contests than males of comparable size with intact antlers. This suggests that the males do use antler size to judge to size of their opponent when deciding whether to engage in a fight. A similar phenomenon is seen in other parts of the animal kingdom. Most similar are stalk-eyed flies; the males compare eye stalk spans to determine the winner and avoid an energy-consuming encounter (6).

== Evolution of antlers in Phytalmiinae ==
It is hypothesized that antlers in flies evolved several times because the antlers serve different purposes in other antlered fly species. Other species use antlers to push or prod their opponent whereas the P. mouldsi uses them only to size-up their opponent. In fact, P. mouldsi has the least complex antlers of the Phytalmiinae subfamily. The six other antlered species in Phytalmiinae include P. cervicornis, P. alcicornis, P. biarmata, P. megalotis, P. antilocapra, and P. robertsi.

== Recent research about antlered flies ==
In 2005, a study was conducted on several species of Phytalmia to determine is environmental stresses negatively impacted development of antlers. It was hypothesized that the stresses, specifically deforestation, would cause the males to grow more asymmetrical antlers. Only one species, Phytalia biarmata, showed increased asymmetry in deforested areas; so, the data did not strongly support the hypothesis.
