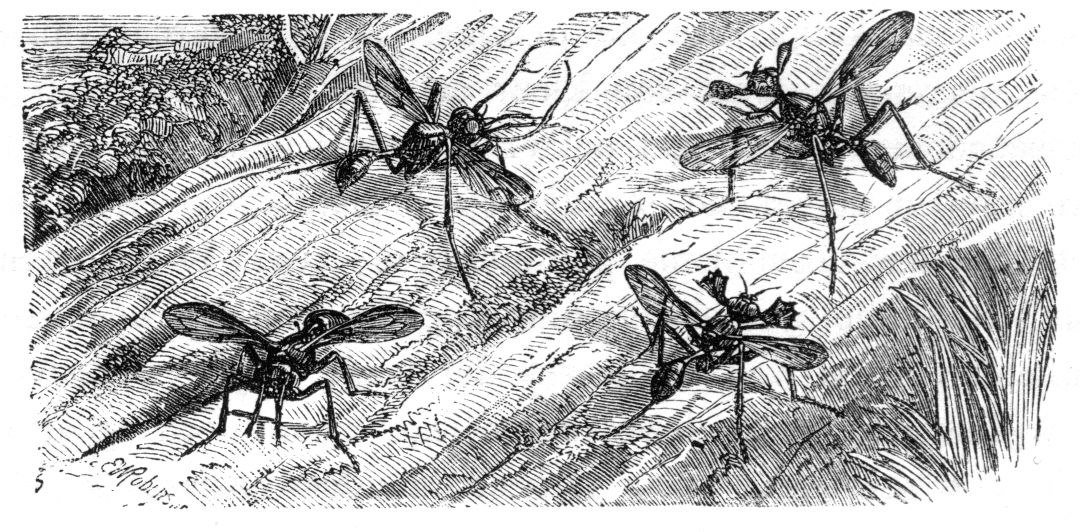

Scientific classification
- Domain: Eukaryota
- Kingdom: Animalia
- Phylum: Arthropoda
- Class: Insecta
- Order: Diptera
- Family: Tephritidae
- Subfamily: Phytalmiinae
- Tribe: Phytalmiini
- Genus: Phytalmia; Gerstaecker, 1860

Synonyms
- Archiphytalmia Enderlein, 1936; Elaphomyia Saunders, 1861

= Phytalmia =

Genus of flies

Phytalmia is a genus of tephritid or fruit flies in the family Tephritidae. The males of some species are noted for their hornlike projections on their heads, which are used for fighting.

== Species ==
- Phytalmia alcicornis (Saunders, 1861)
- Phytalmia antilocapra McAlpine & Schneider, 1978
- Phytalmia biarmata Malloch, 1939
- Phytalmia cervicornis Gerstaecker, 1860
- Phytalmia megalotis Gerstaecker, 1860
- Phytalmia mouldsi McAlpine & Schneider, 1978
- Phytalmia robertsi Schneider, 1993
