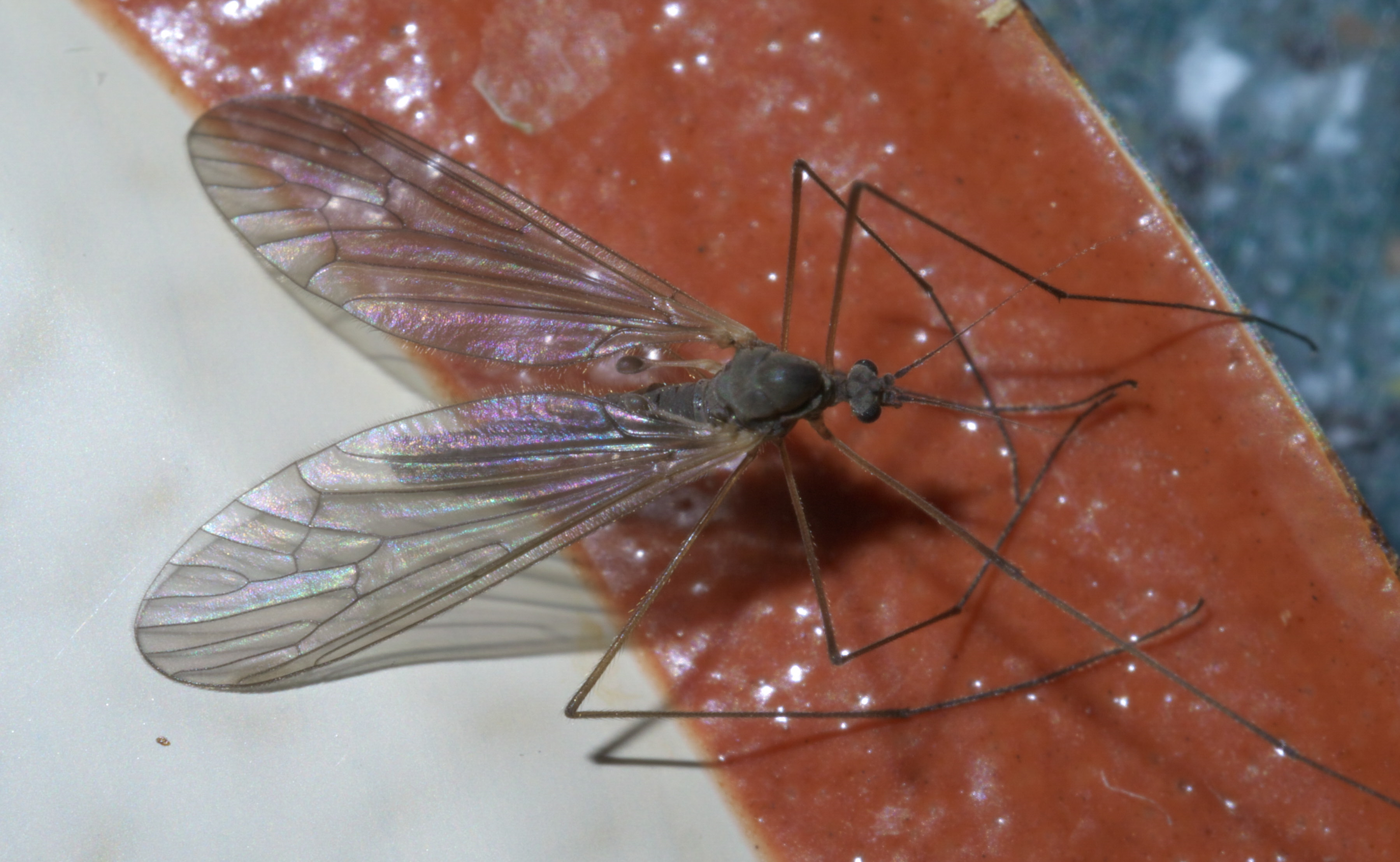

Scientific classification
- Domain: Eukaryota
- Kingdom: Animalia
- Phylum: Arthropoda
- Class: Insecta
- Order: Diptera
- Family: Trichoceridae
- Genus: Trichocera; Meigen, 1803

Diversity
- at least 140 species

= Trichocera =

Genus of flies

Trichocera is a genus of winter crane flies in the family Trichoceridae. There are more than 140 described species in Trichocera.

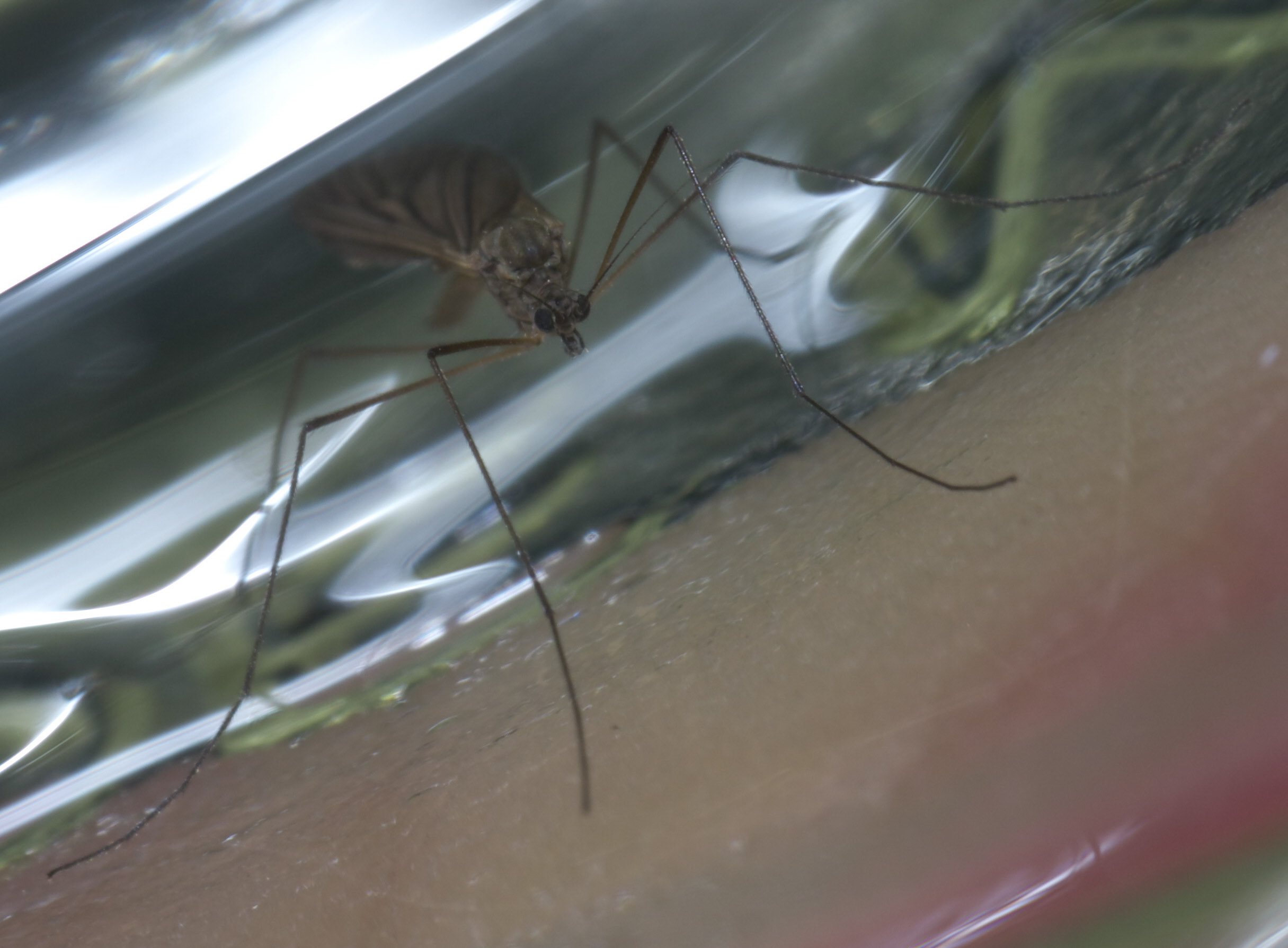

== See also ==
- List of Trichocera species
