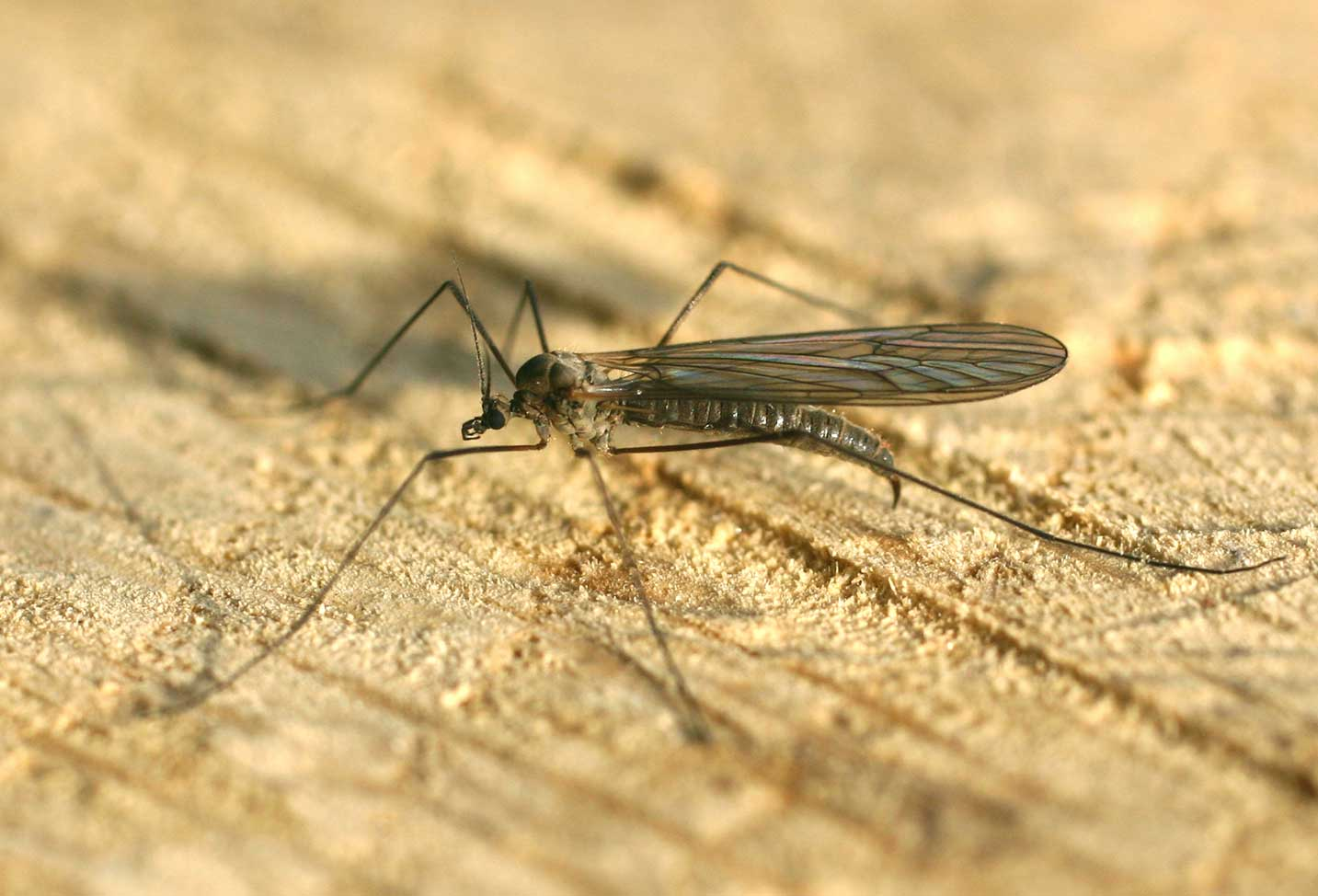
- Trichocera hiemalis

Scientific classification
- Kingdom: Animalia
- Phylum: Arthropoda
- Clade: Pancrustacea
- Class: Insecta
- Order: Diptera
- Suborder: Nematocera
- Infraorder: Tipulomorpha
- Superfamily: Trichoceroidea
- Family: Trichoceridae; Rondani, 1841

Genera
- Diazosoma; Paracladura; Trichocera

= Trichoceridae =

Winter crane flies Temporal range: Early Jurassic–Recent

Family of flies

Trichoceridae, or winter crane flies, of the order Diptera are long, thin, delicate insects superficially similar in appearance to the Tipulidae, Tanyderidae, and Ptychopteridae. They are the sole member of the superfamily Trichoceroidea. The presence of ocelli distinguishes the Trichoceridae from these other families. There are approximately 160 known species. The adults can be found flying in the fall and the spring and some are active even in the winter, hence their common name. They form dancing, loose swarms of mostly males. Adults can also be found resting inside caves and hollow logs. Larvae occur in moist habitats where they feed on decaying organic matter. They are important contributors to winter food webs.

== Range ==
Distributed globally. Most Trichoceridae species are found in non-tropical regions (Holarctic regions). There are 27 species in North America.

== Description ==
Besides Trichoceridae, there are very few insects that appear in adult form during the winter months. They are usually seen swarming in the fall or early spring and can be seen on mild winter days. Adult trichocerids are medium-sized flies that are hard to distinguish in the field. Aside from the presence of ocelli, they have a V-shaped suture on the mesonotum and distinct wing venation (if present). Larvae are also found in colder months throughout the year. They live in decaying vegetable matter and can be distinguished by their well-developed head capsule, amphineustic spiracular arrangement, and are oblique/vertical.See for details of morphology

== Evolutionary history ==
The oldest fossil of the group is Mailotrichocera, which is known from the Early to Late Jurassic of Eurasia.
