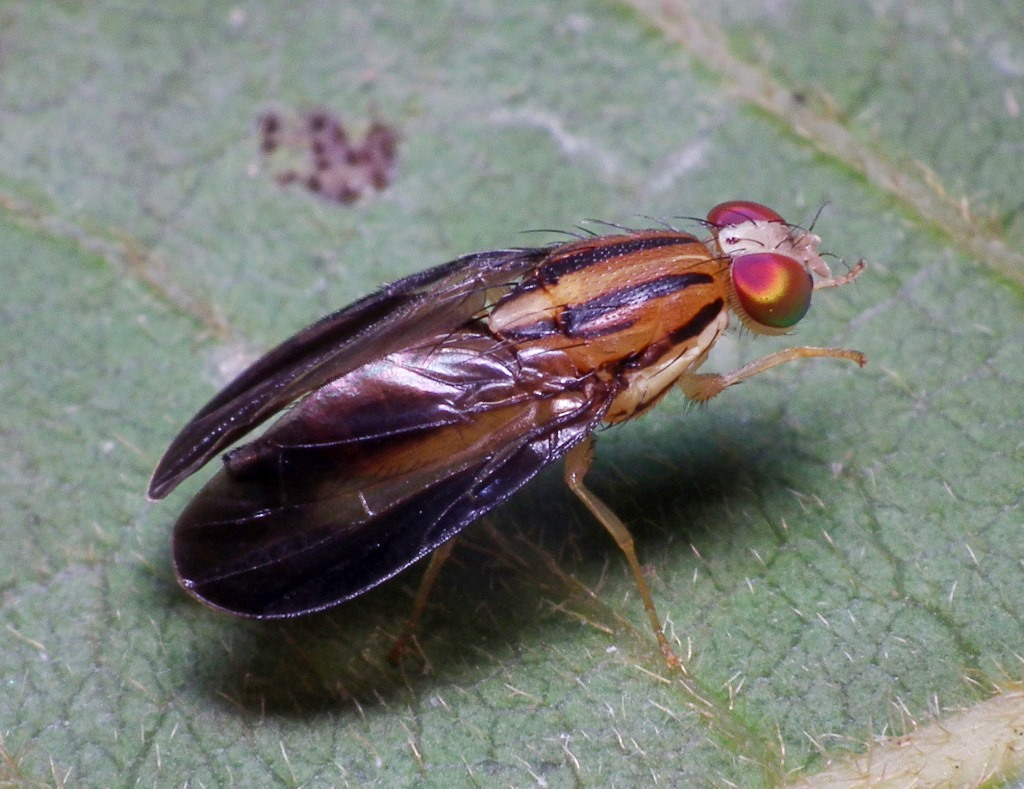
- Clusiosomina puncticeps

Scientific classification
- Kingdom: Animalia
- Phylum: Arthropoda
- Class: Insecta
- Order: Diptera
- Family: Tephritidae
- Subfamily: Phytalmiinae; Hendel, 1914

Genera
- See text

Diversity
- 95 genera, ca. 330 species

= Phytalmiinae =

Subfamily of flies

The Phytalmiinae are a subfamily of tephritid fruit flies.

== Systematics ==
The Phytalmiinae are grouped into four tribes:

- Acanthonevrini: 281 species in the following 76 genera:

Acanthonevra, Acanthonevroides, Aethiothemara, Afrocneros, Alloeomyia, Anchiacanthonevra, Antisophira, Aridonevra, Austronevra, Austrorioxa, Buloloa, Cheesmanomyia, Cleitamiphanes, Clusiosoma (subgenera Clusiosoma and Paraclusiosoma), Clusiosomina, Copiolepis, Cribrorioxa, Dacopsis, Diarrhegma, Dirioxa, Ectopomyia, Emheringia, Enicopterina, Enoplopteron, Exallosophira, Felderimyia, Freyomyia, Gressittidium, Griphomyia, Hemiclusiosoma, Hexacinia, Hexamela, Hexaresta, Labeschatia, Langatia, Loriomyia, Lumirioxa, Lyronotum, Micronevrina, Mimoeuphranta, Neothemara, Nothoclusiosoma, Ocnerioxa, Orienticaelum, Paedohexacinia, Parachlaena, Phorelliosoma, Polyara, Polyaroidea, Pseudacanthoneura, Pseudacrotoxa, Pseudoneothemara, Ptilona, Ptiloniola, Quasirhabdochaeta, Rabaulia, Rabauliomorpha, Rioxa, Saucromyia, Sophira (subgenera Kambangania, Parasophira, Soosina and Sophira), Sophiroides, Sophiropsis, Staurellina, Stigmatomyia, Stymbara, Taeniorioxa, Termitorioxa, Themara, Themarictera, Themarohystrix, Themaroides, Themaroidopsis, Tritaeniopteron, Trypanocentra (subgenera Clusiomorpha and Trypanocentra) and Walkeraitia.

- Epacrocerini: 7 species in the following 4 genera:

Epacrocerus, Proepacrocerus, Tanymetopus and Udamolobium.

- Phascini: 14 species in the following 6 genera:

Diarrhegmoides, Homoiothemara, Othniocera, Paraphasca, Phasca and Xenosophira.

- Phytalmiini: 23 species included in the following 5 genera:

Diplochorda, Matsumurania, Ortaloptera, Phytalmia and Sessilina.

Six species in the next four genera are not included in any of the above tribes:

Colobostroter, Pseudosophira, Robertsomyia and Terastiomyia.
