= Dacopsis =

Scientific classification
- Kingdom: Animalia
- Phylum: Arthropoda
- Class: Insecta
- Order: Diptera
- Family: Tephritidae
- Subfamily: Phytalmiinae
- Genus: Dacopsis

Genus of flies

Dacopsis is a genus of tephritid or fruit flies in the family Tephritidae.

== Species ==
- Dacopsis apicalis (Hardy, 1980)
- Dacopsis caeca (Bezzi, 1914)
- Dacopsis flava (Edwards, 1915)
- Dacopsis holoxantha Hering, 1941
- Dacopsis mantissa Hering, 1952
- Dacopsis medioflava Hardy, 1974
- Dacopsis quadripunctata Malloch, 1939
- Dacopsis signata Walker, 1860
