= Rabaulia =

Scientific classification
- Kingdom: Animalia
- Phylum: Arthropoda
- Clade: Pancrustacea
- Class: Insecta
- Order: Diptera
- Family: Tephritidae
- Subfamily: Phytalmiinae
- Genus: Rabaulia

Genus of flies

Rabaulia is a genus of tephritid or fruit flies in the family Tephritidae.

== Species ==
- Rabaulia fascifacies Malloch, 1939
- Rabaulia invittata Hering, 1951
- Rabaulia nigrotibia Hering, 1941
