= Termitorioxa =

Scientific classification
- Kingdom: Animalia
- Phylum: Arthropoda
- Class: Insecta
- Order: Diptera
- Family: Tephritidae
- Subfamily: Phytalmiinae
- Genus: Termitorioxa

Genus of flies

Termitorioxa is a genus of tephritid or fruit flies in the family Tephritidae.

== Species ==
- Termitorioxa bicalcaratus
- Termitorioxa cobourgensis
- Termitorioxa exleyae
- Termitorioxa flava
- Termitorioxa inconnexa
- Termitorioxa laurae
- Termitorioxa meritoria
- Termitorioxa termitoxena
- Termitorioxa testacea
- Termitorioxa timorensis
