= Terastiomyia =

Scientific classification
- Kingdom: Animalia
- Phylum: Arthropoda
- Class: Insecta
- Order: Diptera
- Family: Tephritidae
- Subfamily: Phytalmiinae
- Genus: Terastiomyia

Genus of flies

Terastiomyia is a genus of tephritid or fruit flies in the family Tephritidae.

== Species ==
- Terastiomyia clavigera Hardy, 1958
- Terastiomyia distorta Walker, 1858
- Terastiomyia lobifera Bigot, 1859
