= Sessilina =

Scientific classification
- Domain: Eukaryota
- Kingdom: Animalia
- Phylum: Arthropoda
- Class: Insecta
- Order: Diptera
- Family: Tephritidae
- Subfamily: Phytalmiinae
- Tribe: Phytalmiini
- Genus: Sessilina; McAlpine & Schneider, 1978

Genus of flies

Sessilina is a genus of tephritid or fruit flies in the family Tephritidae.

== Species ==
- Sessilina horrida McAlpine & Schneider, 1978
- Sessilina literata McAlpine & Schneider, 1978
- Sessilina nigrilinea Walker, 1861
