= Homoiothemara =

Scientific classification
- Kingdom: Animalia
- Phylum: Arthropoda
- Class: Insecta
- Order: Diptera
- Family: Tephritidae
- Subfamily: Phytalmiinae
- Genus: Homoiothemara; Hardy, 1988

Genus of flies

Homoiothemara is a genus of tephritid or fruit flies in the family Tephritidae. The only species in this genus are:

- Homoiothemara eurycephala Hardy, 1988
