= Pseudacanthoneura =

Scientific classification
- Kingdom: Animalia
- Phylum: Arthropoda
- Class: Insecta
- Order: Diptera
- Family: Tephritidae
- Subfamily: Phytalmiinae
- Genus: Pseudacanthoneura

Genus of flies

Pseudacanthoneura is a genus of tephritid or fruit flies in the family Tephritidae.There are two known species that got recognizes:

- Pseudacanthoneura aberrans Hardy, 1986
- Pseudacanthoneura sexguttata Meijere, 1913
