= Phorelliosoma hexachaeta =

Scientific classification
- Kingdom: Animalia
- Phylum: Arthropoda
- Class: Insecta
- Order: Diptera
- Family: Tephritidae
- Genus: Phorelliosoma
- Species: P. hexachaeta

Binomial name
- Phorelliosoma hexachaeta Hendel, 1914

Species of fly

Phorelliosoma hexachaeta is a species of tephritid or fruit flies in the genus Phorelliosoma of the family Tephritidae.
