= Sophira =

Scientific classification
- Kingdom: Animalia
- Phylum: Arthropoda
- Class: Insecta
- Order: Diptera
- Family: Tephritidae
- Subfamily: Phytalmiinae
- Tribe: Acanthonevrini
- Genus: Sophira; Walker, 1856

Synonyms
- Colobostrella Hendel, 1914; Heterosophira Hardy, 1973; Icteroptera Wulp, 1899; Seraca Walker, 1860

Genus of flies

Sophira is a genus of tephritid or fruit flies in the family Tephritidae.The only species from this genus are:

- Sophira borneensis Hering, 1952

== Subgenus ==
Subgenus (Sophira)

Subgenus (Soosina)

Subgenus (Parasophira)

Subgenus (Kambangania)
