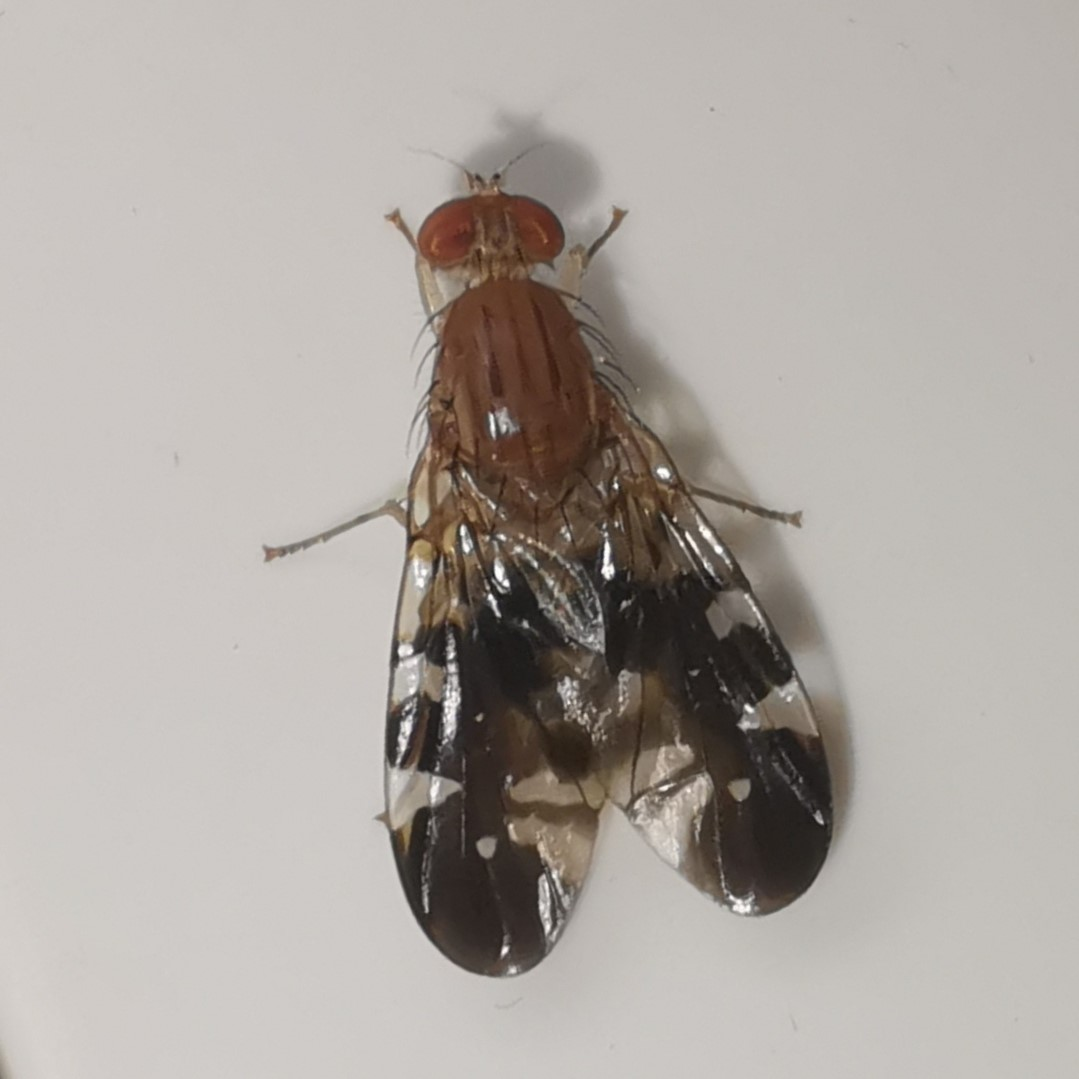
- Acanthonevra dunlopi

Scientific classification
- Domain: Eukaryota
- Kingdom: Animalia
- Phylum: Arthropoda
- Class: Insecta
- Order: Diptera
- Family: Tephritidae
- Subfamily: Phytalmiinae
- Tribe: Acanthonevrini
- Genus: Acanthonevra; Macquart, 1843

= Acanthonevra =

Genus of flies

Acanthonevra is a genus of tephritid or fruit flies in the family Tephritidae.

== Species ==
- Acanthonevra affluens
- Acanthonevra amurensis
- Acanthonevra ceramensis
- Acanthonevra continua
- Acanthonevra desperata
- Acanthonevra dunlopi
- Acanthonevra formosana
- Acanthonevra fuscipennis
- Acanthonevra gravelyi
- Acanthonevra hemileina
- Acanthonevra imparata
- Acanthonevra incerta
- Acanthonevra inermis
- Acanthonevra marginata
- Acanthonevra melanopleura
- Acanthonevra melanostoma
- Acanthonevra nigrifacies
- Acanthonevra nigrolimbata
- Acanthonevra normaliceps
- Acanthonevra notabilis
- Acanthonevra ornatipennis
- Acanthonevra parvisetalis
- Acanthonevra pteropleuralis
- Acanthonevra quatei
- Acanthonevra scutellopunctata
- Acanthonevra setosifemora
- Acanthonevra shinonagai
- Acanthonevra siamensis
- Acanthonevra speciosa
- Acanthonevra sumbawana
- Acanthonevra trigona
- Acanthonevra trigonina
- Acanthonevra ultima
- Acanthonevra uncinata
- Acanthonevra unicolor
- Acanthonevra vaga
- Acanthonevra varipes
- Acanthonevra vidua
