= Diarrhegmoides =

Scientific classification
- Kingdom: Animalia
- Phylum: Arthropoda
- Clade: Pancrustacea
- Class: Insecta
- Order: Diptera
- Family: Tephritidae
- Subfamily: Phytalmiinae
- Tribe: Phascini
- Genus: Diarrhegmoides; Malloch, 1939
- Species: D. hastata

Binomial name
- Diarrhegmoides hastata Malloch, 1939

Genus of flies

Diarrhegmoides is a genus of tephritid or fruit flies in the family Tephritidae. The only species from this genus is Diarrhegmoides hastata.
