= Cribrorioxa =

Scientific classification
- Kingdom: Animalia
- Phylum: Arthropoda
- Clade: Pancrustacea
- Class: Insecta
- Order: Diptera
- Family: Tephritidae
- Subfamily: Phytalmiinae
- Genus: Cribrorioxa; Hering, 1952

Genus of flies

Cribrorioxa is a monotypic genus of tephritid fruit flies in the family Tephritidae. The only species in this genus is Cribrorioxa perforata Hering, 1952
