= Griphomyia =

Scientific classification
- Kingdom: Animalia
- Phylum: Arthropoda
- Class: Insecta
- Order: Diptera
- Family: Tephritidae
- Subfamily: Phytalmiinae
- Genus: Griphomyia

Genus of flies

Griphomyia is a genus of fruit fly in the family Tephritidae.

== Species ==
- Griphomyia argentifrons Hardy, 1987
- Griphomyia brunnipennis Hardy, 1987
- Griphomyia spilota Hardy, 1987
- Griphomyia vittata Hardy, 1987
- Griphomyia vittifrons Hardy, 1987
