= Buloloa =

Scientific classification
- Domain: Eukaryota
- Kingdom: Animalia
- Phylum: Arthropoda
- Class: Insecta
- Order: Diptera
- Family: Tephritidae
- Subfamily: Phytalmiinae
- Tribe: Acanthonevrini
- Genus: Buloloa; Hardy, 1986

Genus of flies

Buloloa is a genus of tephritid (fruit flies) in the family Tephritidae. The genus was named by Hardy in 1986.

== Species ==
- Buloloa spinicosta
