= Emheringia =

Scientific classification
- Kingdom: Animalia
- Phylum: Arthropoda
- Class: Insecta
- Order: Diptera
- Family: Tephritidae
- Subfamily: Phytalmiinae
- Tribe: Acanthonevrini
- Genus: Emheringia; Hardy, 1989

Genus of flies

Emheringia is a genus of tephritid or fruit flies in the family Tephritidae. There is only one species in this genus:

- Emheringia longiplaga Hering, 1939
