= Diplochorda =

Scientific classification
- Domain: Eukaryota
- Kingdom: Animalia
- Phylum: Arthropoda
- Class: Insecta
- Order: Diptera
- Family: Tephritidae
- Subfamily: Phytalmiinae
- Tribe: Phytalmiini
- Genus: Diplochorda; Osten Sacken, 1881

Genus of flies

Diplochorda is a genus of tephritid or fruit flies in the family Tephritidae.

== Species ==
- Diplochorda aneura
- Diplochorda australis
- Diplochorda brevicornis
- Diplochorda concisa
- Diplochorda minor
- Diplochorda myrmex
- Diplochorda ophion
- Diplochorda trineata
- Diplochorda turgida
- Diplochorda unistriata
