= Clusiosoma =

Scientific classification
- Kingdom: Animalia
- Phylum: Arthropoda
- Class: Insecta
- Order: Diptera
- Family: Tephritidae
- Subfamily: Phytalmiinae
- Genus: Clusiosoma

Genus of fruit flies

Clusiosoma is a genus of tephritid or fruit flies in the family Tephritidae.

== Subgenus ==
Subgenus (Clusiosoma)

Subgenus (Paraclusiosoma)
