= Udamolobium =

Scientific classification
- Kingdom: Animalia
- Phylum: Arthropoda
- Class: Insecta
- Order: Diptera
- Family: Tephritidae
- Subfamily: Phytalmiinae
- Genus: Udamolobium

Species
- Udamolobium pictulum Hardy, 1982

Genus of flies

Udamolobium is a genus of tephritid or fruit flies in the family Tephritidae.
