= Colobostroter =

Scientific classification
- Kingdom: Animalia
- Phylum: Arthropoda
- Clade: Pancrustacea
- Class: Insecta
- Order: Diptera
- Family: Tephritidae
- Subfamily: Phytalmiinae
- Genus: Colobostroter; Enderlein, 1911

Genus of flies

Colobostroter is a monotypic genus of tephritid or fruit flies in the family Tephritidae.The only species is Colobostroter pulchralis Enderlein, 1911
