= Cheesmanomyia =

Scientific classification
- Kingdom: Animalia
- Phylum: Arthropoda
- Clade: Pancrustacea
- Class: Insecta
- Order: Diptera
- Family: Tephritidae
- Subfamily: Phytalmiinae
- Genus: Cheesmanomyia; Malloch, 1939
- Species: C. nigra

Binomial name
- Cheesmanomyia nigra (Meijere, 1906)

Genus of flies

Cheesmanomyia is a genus of tephritid or fruit flies in the family Tephritidae. The only species in this genus is Cheesmanomyia nigra Meijere, 1906.
