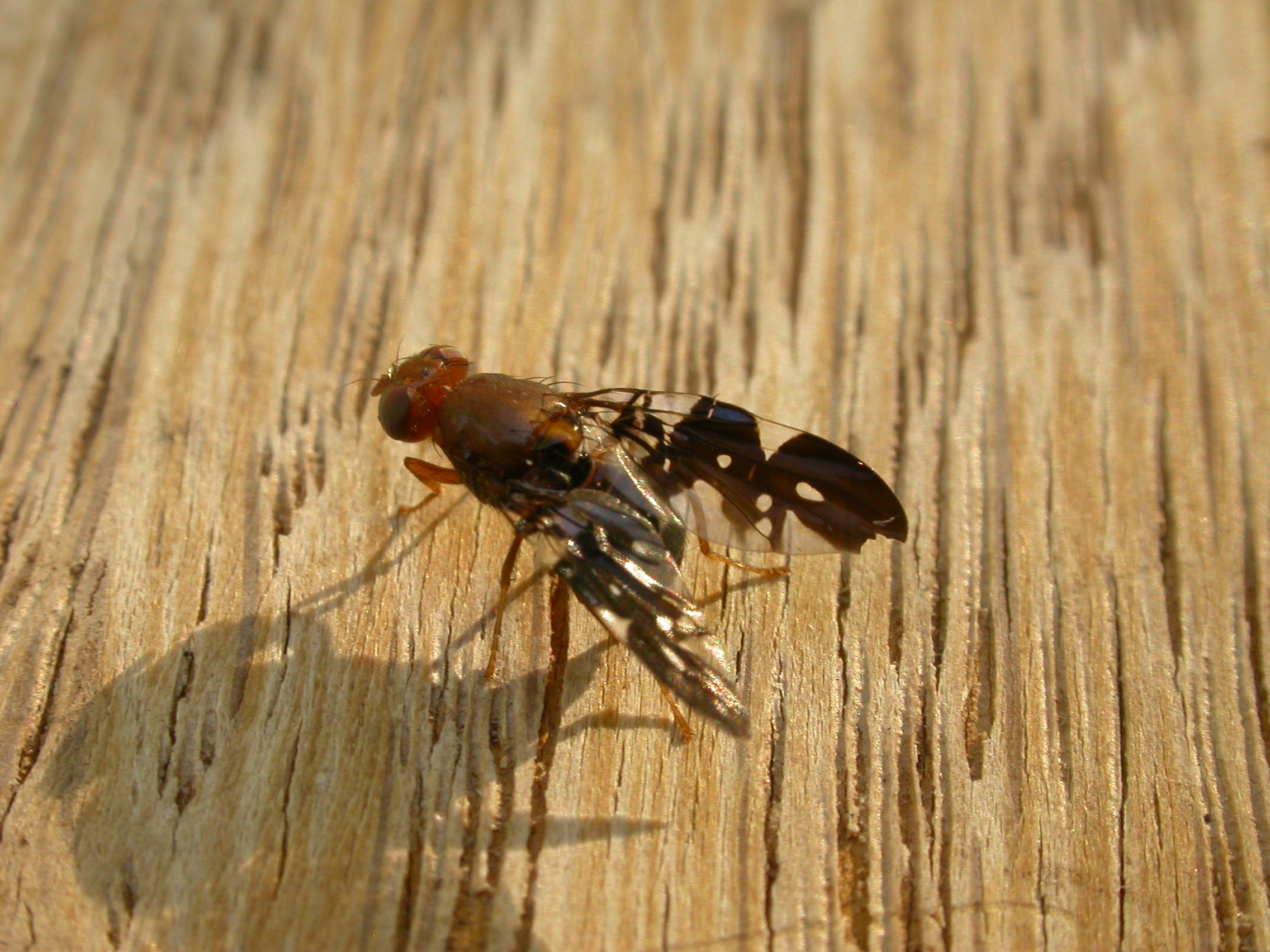
- Acanthonevroides jarvisi

Scientific classification
- Kingdom: Animalia
- Phylum: Arthropoda
- Clade: Pancrustacea
- Class: Insecta
- Order: Diptera
- Family: Tephritidae
- Subfamily: Phytalmiinae
- Tribe: Acanthonevrini
- Genus: Acanthonevroides; Permkam & Hancock, 1995

= Acanthonevroides =

Genus of flies

Acanthonevroides is a genus of tephritid or fruit flies in the family Tephritidae.

== Species ==
- Acanthonevroides basalis (Walker, 1853)
- Acanthonevroides jarvisi (Tryon, 1927)
- Acanthonevroides mayi Permkam & Hancock, 1995
- Acanthonevroides nigriventris (Malloch, 1939)
- Acanthonevroides variegatus Permkam & Hancock, 1995
