= Dirioxa =

Scientific classification
- Kingdom: Animalia
- Phylum: Arthropoda
- Clade: Pancrustacea
- Class: Insecta
- Order: Diptera
- Family: Tephritidae
- Subfamily: Phytalmiinae
- Tribe: Acanthonevrini
- Genus: Dirioxa; Hendel, 1928

Genus of flies

Dirioxa is a genus of tephritid or fruit flies in the family Tephritidae. It occurs in Australia, mainly along the eastern coast.

== Species ==
- Dirioxa fuscipennis
- Dirioxa pornia
