= Loriomyia =

Scientific classification
- Kingdom: Animalia
- Phylum: Arthropoda
- Class: Insecta
- Order: Diptera
- Family: Tephritidae
- Subfamily: Phytalmiinae
- Genus: Loriomyia

Synonyms
- Agnostophana Hering, 1953

Genus of flies

Loriomyia is a monotypic genus of tephritid or fruit flies in the family Tephritidae. The single accepted species in the genus is Loriomyia guttipennis, first described by Kertesz in 1899.
