= Phasca =

Scientific classification
- Domain: Eukaryota
- Kingdom: Animalia
- Phylum: Arthropoda
- Class: Insecta
- Order: Diptera
- Family: Tephritidae
- Subfamily: Phytalmiinae
- Tribe: Phascini
- Genus: Phasca; Hering, 1953

Genus of flies

Phasca is a genus of tephritid or fruit flies in the family Tephritidae.

== Species ==
- Phasca bicunea Hardy, 1986
- Phasca connexa Hardy, 1986
- Phasca maculifacies Hardy, 1986
- Phasca ortalioides Walker, 1865
- Phasca sedlaceki Hardy, 1986
- Phasca trifasciata Hardy, 1986
