= Xenosophira =

Scientific classification
- Domain: Eukaryota
- Kingdom: Animalia
- Phylum: Arthropoda
- Class: Insecta
- Order: Diptera
- Family: Tephritidae
- Subfamily: Phytalmiinae
- Tribe: Phascini
- Genus: Xenosophira; Hardy, 1980

Genus of flies

Xenosophira is a genus of tephritid or fruit flies in the family Tephritidae.There are two known species are recognized:

- Xenosophira invibrissata Hardy, 1980
- Xenosophira vibrissata Hardy, 1980
