= Pseudacrotoxa =

Scientific classification
- Kingdom: Animalia
- Phylum: Arthropoda
- Clade: Pancrustacea
- Class: Insecta
- Order: Diptera
- Family: Tephritidae
- Subfamily: Phytalmiinae
- Genus: Pseudacrotoxa

Genus of flies

Pseudacrotoxa is a genus of tephritid or fruit flies in the family Tephritidae.There are only one species from this genus are:

- Pseudacrotoxa appendicigera Hering, 1941
