= Hexamela =

Scientific classification
- Kingdom: Animalia
- Phylum: Arthropoda
- Class: Insecta
- Order: Diptera
- Family: Tephritidae
- Subfamily: Phytalmiinae
- Genus: Hexamela

Genus of flies

Hexamela is a genus of tephritid or fruit flies in the family Tephritidae.There only one species from this genus are:

- Hexamela bipunctata Zia, 1963
