= Aethiothemara =

Scientific classification
- Kingdom: Animalia
- Phylum: Arthropoda
- Clade: Pancrustacea
- Class: Insecta
- Order: Diptera
- Family: Tephritidae
- Subfamily: Phytalmiinae
- Tribe: Acanthonevrini
- Genus: Aethiothemara; Hendel, 1928

Genus of flies

Aethiothemara is a genus of fruit fly in the family Tephritidae. It has six accepted species. Members can be found in Africa, in the nations of Ivory Coast, Ghana, and Kenya. Unconfirmed sightings include locations in Gabon, Cameroon, and Republic of the Congo.

At least one of the species in the genus, Aethiothemara transiens, is dinurnal. Like other fruit flies, this genus is believed to breed in figs, otherwise damaged fruit, and tree bark.

Aethiothemara was named in 1928.

== Species ==
- Aethiothemara fallacivena Enderlein, 1911
- Aethiothemara graueri Hendel, 1928
- Aethiothemara speiseriana Bezzi, 1924
- Aethiothemara striata Hendel, 1928
- Aethiothemara transiens Hendel, 1928
- Aethiothemara trigona Hendel, 1928
