= Saucromyia =

Scientific classification
- Kingdom: Animalia
- Phylum: Arthropoda
- Class: Insecta
- Order: Diptera
- Family: Tephritidae
- Subfamily: Phytalmiinae
- Genus: Saucromyia

Genus of flies

Saucromyia is a genus of tephritid or fruit flies in the family Tephritidae.The only species from this genus are:

- Saucromyia bicolor Hardy, 1986
