= Acanthonevroides basalis =

Scientific classification
- Kingdom: Animalia
- Phylum: Arthropoda
- Class: Insecta
- Order: Diptera
- Family: Tephritidae
- Genus: Acanthonevroides
- Species: A. basalis

Binomial name
- Acanthonevroides basalis (Walker 1853)

Species of fly

Acanthonevroides basalis is a species of tephritid or fruit flies in the genus Acanthonevroides of the family Tephritidae.
