= Orienticaelum =

Scientific classification
- Kingdom: Animalia
- Phylum: Arthropoda
- Class: Insecta
- Order: Diptera
- Family: Tephritidae
- Subfamily: Phytalmiinae
- Genus: Orienticaelum

Genus of flies

Orienticaelum is a genus of tephritid or fruit flies in the family Tephritidae. There is one species in the genus:

- Orienticaelum femoratum Shiraki, 1933
