= Dirioxa pornia =

Scientific classification
- Kingdom: Animalia
- Phylum: Arthropoda
- Class: Insecta
- Order: Diptera
- Family: Tephritidae
- Genus: Dirioxa
- Species: D. pornia

Binomial name
- Dirioxa pornia (Walker, 1849)

Species of fruit fly native to Australia

Dirioxa pornia, commonly known as the island fly, is a species of fruit fly native to Australia.

== Description ==
Adults of D. pornia have the following features: length 5.5–8.5 mm, antennal arista plumose on the dorsal surface but bare on the ventral; thorax scutum mostly red-brown with 6 scutellar setae, scutellum flat and bare of microsetae, abdomen with black tip, tibia of the mid leg with one strong apical spine, a distinctive dark pattern on the wing, and abdominal tergites fulvous (reddish-yellow, tawny) with the third to fifth having transverse black patterns. In adult males, the surstylus is short and thick, while in adult females, the aculeus is rounded and blunt at the apex.

== Range ==
This species occurs in eastern Australia (Queensland, New South Wales and Victoria) and has also been introduced to Western Australia.

== Ecology ==
Dirioxa pornia attacks ripe, damaged and fallen fruit of plants in many different families. It is unable to attack healthy fruit, possibly due to the larvae being unable to penetrate the rind. In orchids, density of D. pornia is related to the density of fallen and discarded fruit on the orchid floor.

== Quarantine significance ==
While it is not an economically significant pest, D. pornia larvae resemble larvae of pest tephritid species, requiring molecular techniques to distinguish them. Detections of D. pornia in fruit exported from Australia are thus quarantine issues until molecular identification is completed.
