= Micronevrina =

Scientific classification
- Kingdom: Animalia
- Phylum: Arthropoda
- Class: Insecta
- Order: Diptera
- Family: Tephritidae
- Subfamily: Phytalmiinae
- Genus: Micronevrina

Genus of flies

Micronevrina is a genus of tephritid or fruit flies in the family Tephritidae.

== Species ==
- Micronevrina apicalis Permkam & Hancock, 1995
- Micronevrina breviseta Permkam & Hancock, 1995
- Micronevrina gloriosa Permkam & Hancock, 1995
- Micronevrina hyalina Permkam & Hancock, 1995
- Micronevrina mediivitta Permkam & Hancock, 1995
- Micronevrina montana Permkam & Hancock, 1995
- Micronevrina setosa Permkam & Hancock, 1995
