= Hexaresta =

Scientific classification
- Kingdom: Animalia
- Phylum: Arthropoda
- Class: Insecta
- Order: Diptera
- Family: Tephritidae
- Subfamily: Phytalmiinae
- Genus: Hexaresta

Species
- See text

Genus of flies

Hexaresta is a genus of fruit flies in the family Tephritidae. There are only two recognized species from the genus:

- Hexaresta formosa Malloch, 1939
- Hexaresta multistriga Walker, 1859
