= Othniocera =

Scientific classification
- Domain: Eukaryota
- Kingdom: Animalia
- Phylum: Arthropoda
- Class: Insecta
- Order: Diptera
- Family: Tephritidae
- Subfamily: Phytalmiinae
- Tribe: Phascini
- Genus: Othniocera; Hardy, 1986

Genus of flies

Othniocera is a genus of fruit flies in the family Tephritidae.

== Species ==
- Othniocera aberrans Hardy, 1986
- Othniocera pallida Hardy, 1986
- Othniocera pictipennis Hardy, 1986
