= Ptiloniola =

Scientific classification
- Kingdom: Animalia
- Phylum: Arthropoda
- Class: Insecta
- Order: Diptera
- Family: Tephritidae
- Subfamily: Phytalmiinae
- Genus: Ptiloniola

Genus of flies

Ptiloniola is a genus of tephritid or fruit flies in the family Tephritidae.

== Species ==
- Ptiloniola edwardsi Munro, 1967
- Ptiloniola rotunda Munro, 1967
- Ptiloniola tripunctulata Karsch, 1887
