= Pseudosophira =

Scientific classification
- Kingdom: Animalia
- Phylum: Arthropoda
- Clade: Pancrustacea
- Class: Insecta
- Order: Diptera
- Family: Tephritidae
- Subfamily: Phytalmiinae
- Genus: Pseudosophira

Genus of flies

Pseudosophira is a genus of tephritid or fruit flies in the family Tephritidae.The only species from this genus are:

- Pseudosophira bakeri Malloch, 1939
