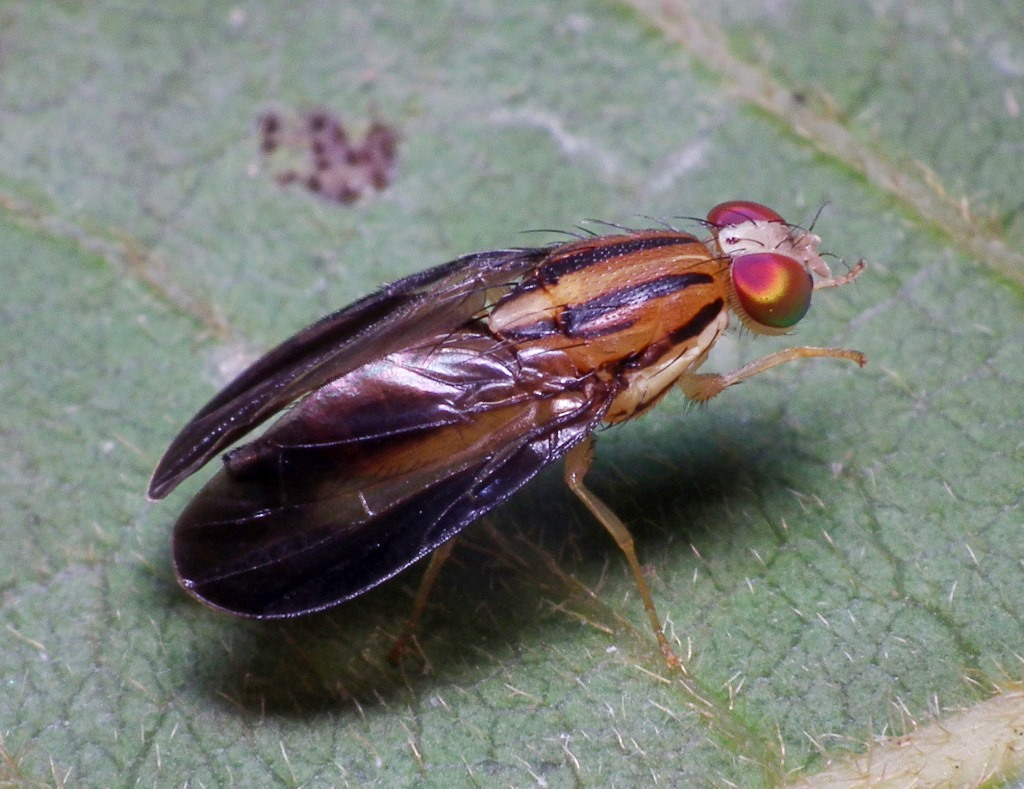
- Clusiosomina puncticeps

Scientific classification
- Kingdom: Animalia
- Phylum: Arthropoda
- Class: Insecta
- Order: Diptera
- Family: Tephritidae
- Subfamily: Phytalmiinae
- Genus: Clusiosomina

= Clusiosomina =

Species of fruit fly in Australia

Clusiosomina is a genus of tephritid fruit flies in the family Tephritidae. Occurring in eastern Australia, it is a monotypic taxon with the single species Clusiosomina puncticeps.

== Description ==
In adults of C. puncticeps, the face, scutum and abdomen are all yellow. The face has a pair of brown lateral spots ventrally. The scutum has a pair of submedial brown stripes that extend onto the scutellum laterally. There is also a lateral stripe extending from each postpronotal lobe to each wing base. The abdomen has broad brown lateral margins. The wings are mostly brown except for the basomedial portions, which are subhyaline (partly transparent). In males, the foretibia has two preapical setae and the fore basitarsus has an apically spinulose anteroventral process.

Males are 4.5-4.7 mm long with wing length 4.0-4.2 mm, while females are 5.0-5.3 mm long with wing length 4.4-4.7 mm.

== Ecology ==
Larvae of C. puncticeps feed in fig fruits (Ficus), like some other species in the Clusiosoma subgroup.

== Gallery ==
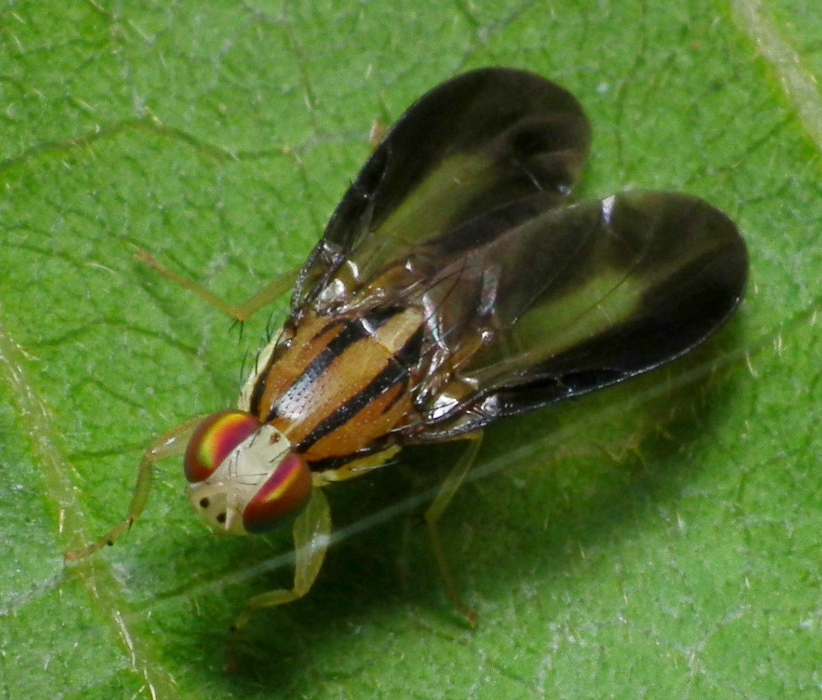
