= Alloeomyia =

Scientific classification
- Domain: Eukaryota
- Kingdom: Animalia
- Phylum: Arthropoda
- Class: Insecta
- Order: Diptera
- Family: Tephritidae
- Subfamily: Phytalmiinae
- Tribe: Acanthonevrini
- Genus: Alloeomyia; Hardy, 1986

Genus of flies

Alloeomyia is a genus of tephritid or fruit flies in the family Tephritidae. There is only one species in this genus:

- Alloeomyia flavida Hardy, 1986
