= Copiolepis =

Scientific classification
- Kingdom: Animalia
- Phylum: Arthropoda
- Clade: Pancrustacea
- Class: Insecta
- Order: Diptera
- Family: Tephritidae
- Subfamily: Phytalmiinae
- Genus: Copiolepis; Enderlein, 1920

Genus of flies

Copiolepis is a genus of tephritid or fruit flies in the family Tephritidae.There are only 2 species recognized:

- Copiolepis colpopteris Permkam & Hancock 1995
- Copiolepis quadrisquamosa Enderlein 1920
