= Erich Martin Hering =

German entomologist (1893–1967)

Erich Martin Hering (10 November 1893, Heinersdorf – 18 August 1967, Berlin) was a German entomologist.

Hering specialised in leaf miners. He was a curator in the Museum für Naturkunde in Berlin, where his collections of Lepidoptera, Coleoptera, Hymenoptera and Diptera are conserved. His collections of Agromyzidae are shared between Museum für Naturkunde and the Agricultural School at Portici, now part of the University of Naples Federico II. Hering issued the exsiccata Minenherbarium. He discovered a species of fly, Acanthonevra scutellopunctata in 1952.

== Selected works ==
- (1926) Die Ökologie der blattminierenden Insektenlarven. pp 253, 2 pl. Borntraeger, Berlin.
- (1951) Biology of leaf-miners. Junk, The Hague.
- (1957) Bestimmungstabellen der Blattminen von Europa einschliesslich des Mittelmeerbeckens und der Kanarischen Inseln, vol. 1–3. Uitgeverij Dr. W. Junk, 's-Gravenhage.
