= Ocnerioxa =

Scientific classification
- Kingdom: Animalia
- Phylum: Arthropoda
- Class: Insecta
- Order: Diptera
- Family: Tephritidae
- Subfamily: Phytalmiinae
- Genus: Ocnerioxa

Genus of flies

Ocnerioxa is a genus of tephritid or fruit flies in the family Tephritidae.

== Species ==
- Ocnerioxa bigemmata
- Ocnerioxa capeneri
- Ocnerioxa cooksoni
- Ocnerioxa delineata
- Ocnerioxa discreta
- Ocnerioxa interrupta
- Ocnerioxa lindneri
- Ocnerioxa pennata
- Ocnerioxa secata
- Ocnerioxa sinuata
- Ocnerioxa tumosa
- Ocnerioxa undata
- Ocnerioxa woodi
