= Tritaeniopteron =

Scientific classification
- Kingdom: Animalia
- Phylum: Arthropoda
- Class: Insecta
- Order: Diptera
- Family: Tephritidae
- Subfamily: Phytalmiinae
- Genus: Tritaeniopteron

Genus of flies

Tritaeniopteron is a genus of tephritid or fruit flies in the family Tephritidae.

== Species ==
- Tritaeniopteron eburneum Meijere, 1914
- Tritaeniopteron excellens Hendel, 1915
- Tritaeniopteron flavifacies Hardy, 1974
- Tritaeniopteron punctatipleurum Senior-White, 1922
- Tritaeniopteron tetraspilotum Hardy, 1973
