= Ptilona =

Scientific classification
- Kingdom: Animalia
- Phylum: Arthropoda
- Class: Insecta
- Order: Diptera
- Family: Tephritidae
- Subfamily: Phytalmiinae
- Genus: Ptilona

Genus of flies

Ptilona is a genus of tephritid or fruit flies in the family Tephritidae.

== Species ==
- Ptilona confinis Walker, 1856
- Ptilona continua Hardy, 1974
- Ptilona dolorosa Hering, 1938
- Ptilona malaisei Hering, 1938
- Ptilona nigrifacies Hardy, 1973
- Ptilona persimilis Hendel, 1915
- Ptilona xizangensis Wang, 1996
