= Paedohexacinia =

Scientific classification
- Kingdom: Animalia
- Phylum: Arthropoda
- Class: Insecta
- Order: Diptera
- Family: Tephritidae
- Subfamily: Phytalmiinae
- Genus: Paedohexacinia

Genus of flies

Paedohexacinia is a genus of tephritid or fruit flies in the family Tephritidae.There two species known to be recognizes:

- Paedohexacinia clusiosomopsis Hardy, 1986
- Paedohexacinia flavithorax Hardy, 1986
