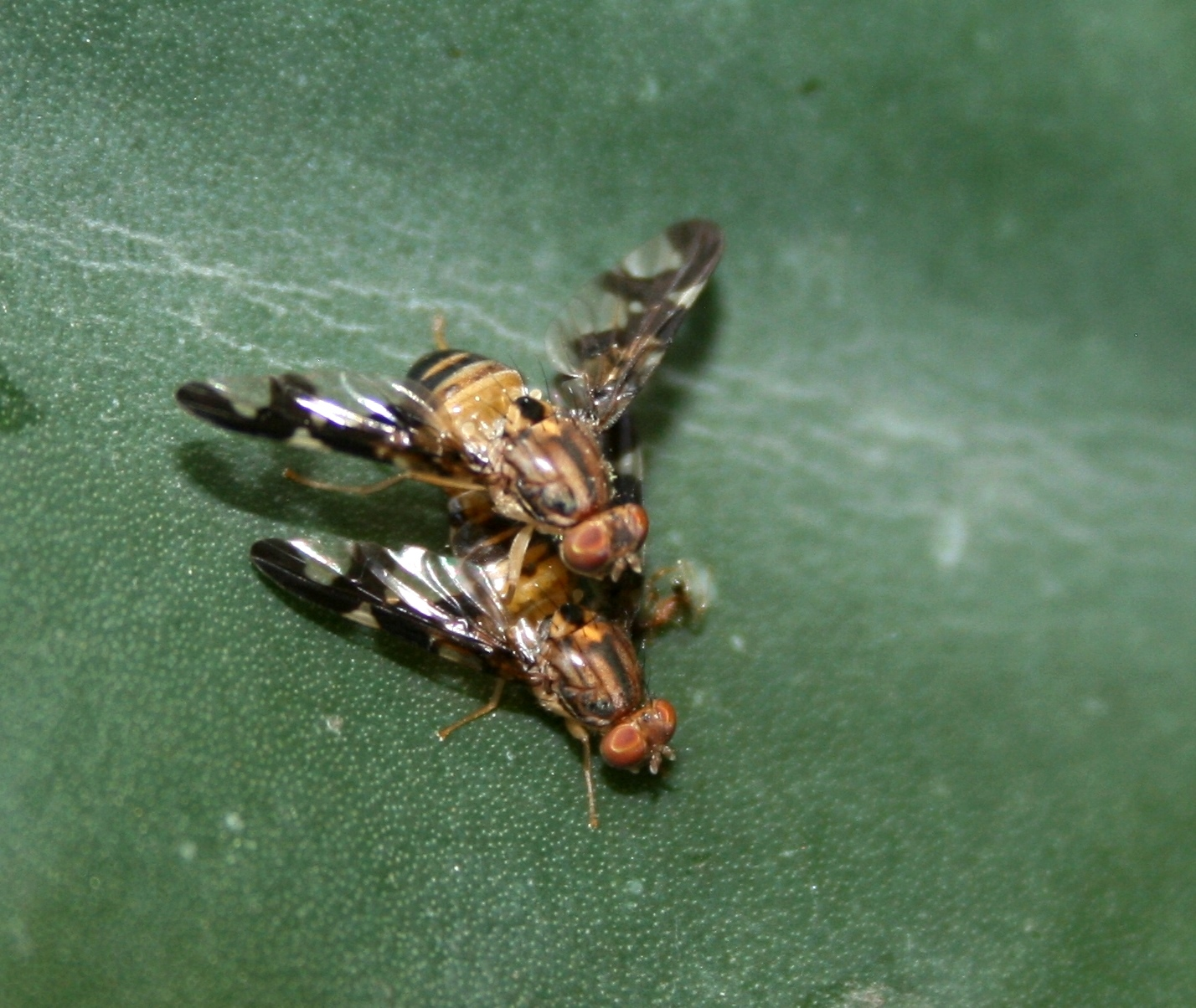
- Afrocneros mundus pair in South Africa

Scientific classification
- Kingdom: Animalia
- Phylum: Arthropoda
- Clade: Pancrustacea
- Class: Insecta
- Order: Diptera
- Family: Tephritidae
- Subfamily: Phytalmiinae
- Tribe: Acanthonevrini
- Genus: Afrocneros; Bezzi, 1924

= Afrocneros =

Genus of flies

Afrocneros is a genus of tephritid or fruit flies in the family Tephritidae.

== Species ==
Species include:

- Afrocneros excellens
- Afrocneros mundissimus
- Afrocneros mundus
