= Afrocneros excellens =

Scientific classification
- Kingdom: Animalia
- Phylum: Arthropoda
- Class: Insecta
- Order: Diptera
- Family: Tephritidae
- Genus: Afrocneros
- Species: A. excellens

Binomial name
- Afrocneros excellens (Loew, 1861)

Species of fly

Afrocneros excellens is a species of tephritid or fruit flies in the genus Afrocneros of the family Tephritidae.
