= Sophiropsis =

Scientific classification
- Kingdom: Animalia
- Phylum: Arthropoda
- Class: Insecta
- Order: Diptera
- Family: Tephritidae
- Subfamily: Phytalmiinae
- Genus: Sophiropsis

Genus of flies

Sophiropsis is a genus of tephritid or fruit flies in the family Tephritidae.There are only two known species that got recognizes:

- Sophiropsis calcarata Hardy, 1986
- Sophiropsis improbata Hering, 1941
