= Staurellina =

Scientific classification
- Kingdom: Animalia
- Phylum: Arthropoda
- Class: Insecta
- Order: Diptera
- Family: Tephritidae
- Subfamily: Phytalmiinae
- Genus: Staurellina

Genus of flies

Staurellina is a genus of tephritids or fruit flies in the family Tephritidae.The only species from this genus are:

- Staurellina trypetopsis Hering, 1941
