= Trypanocentra =

Scientific classification
- Kingdom: Animalia
- Phylum: Arthropoda
- Class: Insecta
- Order: Diptera
- Family: Tephritidae
- Subfamily: Phytalmiinae
- Genus: Trypanocentra

Genus of flies

Trypanocentra is a genus of tephritid or fruit flies in the family Tephritidae.

== Subgenus ==
Subgenus (Trypanocentra)

Subgenus (Clusiomorpha)
