= Nothoclusiosoma =

Scientific classification
- Kingdom: Animalia
- Phylum: Arthropoda
- Class: Insecta
- Order: Diptera
- Family: Tephritidae
- Subfamily: Phytalmiinae
- Genus: Nothoclusiosoma

Genus of flies

Nothoclusiosoma is a genus of tephritid or fruit flies in the family Tephritidae.There are only one species from the genus are:

- Nothoclusiosoma vittithorax Malloch, 1939
