= Hexacinia =

Scientific classification
- Kingdom: Animalia
- Phylum: Arthropoda
- Class: Insecta
- Order: Diptera
- Family: Tephritidae
- Subfamily: Phytalmiinae
- Genus: Hexacinia

Genus of flies

Hexacinia is a genus of tephritid or fruit flies in the family Tephritidae.

== Species ==
- Hexacinia marginemaculata Macquart, 1851
- Hexacinia pellucens Hardy, 1970
- Hexacinia punctifera Walker, 1861
- Hexacinia radiosa Rondani, 1868
- Hexacinia stellipennis Walker, 1860
