= Polyaroidea =

Scientific classification
- Kingdom: Animalia
- Phylum: Arthropoda
- Class: Insecta
- Order: Diptera
- Family: Tephritidae
- Subfamily: Phytalmiinae
- Genus: Polyaroidea

Genus of flies

Polyaroidea is a genus of tephritid or fruit flies in the family Tephritidae.

== Species ==
- Polyaroidea distincta Hardy, 1988
- Polyaroidea opposita Hardy, 1988
- Polyaroidea univittata Hardy, 1988
