= Acanthonevra scutellopunctata =

Scientific classification
- Kingdom: Animalia
- Phylum: Arthropoda
- Class: Insecta
- Order: Diptera
- Family: Tephritidae
- Genus: Acanthonevra
- Species: A. scutellopunctata

Binomial name
- Acanthonevra scutellopunctata Hering, 1952

Species of fly

Acanthonevra scutellopunctata is a species of fly described by German entomologist Erich Martin Hering in 1952.
