= Austronevra =

Scientific classification
- Kingdom: Animalia
- Phylum: Arthropoda
- Clade: Pancrustacea
- Class: Insecta
- Order: Diptera
- Family: Tephritidae
- Subfamily: Phytalmiinae
- Tribe: Acanthonevrini
- Genus: Austronevra; Permkam & Hancock, 1995

Genus of flies

Austronevra is a genus of tephritid or fruit flies in the family Tephritidae. There are three species recognized:

- Austronevra australina Hendel, 1928
- Austronevra bimaculata Permkam & Hancock, 1995
- Austronevra irwini Norrbom & Hancock, 2004
