= Pseudoneothemara =

Scientific classification
- Kingdom: Animalia
- Phylum: Arthropoda
- Class: Insecta
- Order: Diptera
- Family: Tephritidae
- Subfamily: Phytalmiinae
- Genus: Pseudoneothemara

Genus of flies

Pseudoneothemara is a genus of tephritid or fruit flies in the family Tephritidae.There are two known species that got recognizes:

- Pseudoneothemara exul Curran, 1936
- Pseudoneothemara repleta Walker, 1861
