= Mimoeuphranta =

Scientific classification
- Kingdom: Animalia
- Phylum: Arthropoda
- Class: Insecta
- Order: Diptera
- Family: Tephritidae
- Subfamily: Phytalmiinae
- Genus: Mimoeuphranta

Genus of flies

Mimoeuphranta is a genus of tephritid or fruit flies in the family Tephritidae.There are only one species from this genus:

- Mimoeuphranta diaspora Hardy, 1986
