= Themaroides =

Scientific classification
- Kingdom: Animalia
- Phylum: Arthropoda
- Class: Insecta
- Order: Diptera
- Family: Tephritidae
- Subfamily: Phytalmiinae
- Genus: Themaroides

Genus of flies

Themaroides is a genus of tephritid or fruit flies in the family Tephritidae.

== Species ==
- Themaroides abbreviata Walker, 1865
- Themaroides bicolor Hancock & Drew, 2003
- Themaroides quadrifera Walker, 1861
- Themaroides robertsi Hardy, 1986
- Themaroides vittata Hardy, 1986
- Themaroides xanthosoma Hardy, 1986
