= Labeschatia =

Scientific classification
- Kingdom: Animalia
- Phylum: Arthropoda
- Class: Insecta
- Order: Diptera
- Family: Tephritidae
- Subfamily: Phytalmiinae
- Genus: Labeschatia

Genus of flies

Labeschatia is a genus of tephritid or fruit flies in the family Tephritidae.There only one species from this genus are:

- Labeschatia circumlineata Munro, 1967
