= Sophiroides =

Scientific classification
- Kingdom: Animalia
- Phylum: Arthropoda
- Class: Insecta
- Order: Diptera
- Family: Tephritidae
- Subfamily: Phytalmiinae
- Genus: Sophiroides

Genus of flies

Sophiroides is a genus of tephritid or fruit flies in the family Tephritidae.The only species from this genus are:

- Sophiroides flammosa Hendel, 1914
