= Felderimyia =

Scientific classification
- Kingdom: Animalia
- Phylum: Arthropoda
- Class: Insecta
- Order: Diptera
- Family: Tephritidae
- Subfamily: Phytalmiinae
- Genus: Felderimyia

Genus of flies

Felderimyia is a genus of tephritid or fruit flies in the family Tephritidae.

== Species ==
- Felderimyia flavipennis Hancock & Drew, 1994
- Felderimyia fuscipennis Hendel, 1914
- Felderimyia gombakensis Hancock & Drew, 1995
