= Anchiacanthonevra =

Scientific classification
- Kingdom: Animalia
- Phylum: Arthropoda
- Class: Insecta
- Order: Diptera
- Family: Tephritidae
- Subfamily: Phytalmiinae
- Genus: Anchiacanthonevra

Genus of flies

Anchiacanthonevra is a genus of tephritid or fruit flies in the family Tephritidae.There only one species in this genus are:

- Anchiacanthonevra maculipennis Hardy, 1986
