= Themaroidopsis =

Scientific classification
- Kingdom: Animalia
- Phylum: Arthropoda
- Class: Insecta
- Order: Diptera
- Family: Tephritidae
- Subfamily: Phytalmiinae
- Genus: Themaroidopsis

Genus of flies

Themaroidopsis is a genus of tephritid or fruit flies in the family Tephritidae.

== Species ==
- Themaroidopsis insignis Meijere, 1913
- Themaroidopsis quinquevittata Hardy, 1986
- Themaroidopsis rufescens Hardy, 1986
- Themaroidopsis tetraspilota Hardy, 1986
