= Lyronotum =

Scientific classification
- Kingdom: Animalia
- Phylum: Arthropoda
- Class: Insecta
- Order: Diptera
- Family: Tephritidae
- Subfamily: Phytalmiinae
- Genus: Lyronotum

Genus of flies

Lyronotum is a genus of tephritid or fruit flies in the family Tephritidae.There only one species from the genus are:

- Lyronotum seriata Meijere, 1915
