= Polyara =

Scientific classification
- Kingdom: Animalia
- Phylum: Arthropoda
- Class: Insecta
- Order: Diptera
- Family: Tephritidae
- Subfamily: Phytalmiinae
- Genus: Polyara

Genus of flies

Polyara is a genus of tephritid or fruit flies in the family Tephritidae.

== Species ==
- Polyara bambusae Hardy, 1986
- Polyara insolita Walker, 1859
- Polyara leptotrichosa Hardy, 1986
