= Stymbara =

Scientific classification
- Kingdom: Animalia
- Phylum: Arthropoda
- Class: Insecta
- Order: Diptera
- Family: Tephritidae
- Subfamily: Phytalmiinae
- Tribe: Acanthonevrini
- Genus: Stymbara; Walker, 1865

Genus of flies

Stymbara is a genus of tephritid or fruit flies in the family Tephritidae.The only species from this genus are:

- Stymbara concisa Walker, 1864
