= Aridonevra =

Scientific classification
- Kingdom: Animalia
- Phylum: Arthropoda
- Clade: Pancrustacea
- Class: Insecta
- Order: Diptera
- Family: Tephritidae
- Subfamily: Phytalmiinae
- Tribe: Acanthonevrini
- Genus: Aridonevra; Permkam & Hancock, 1995

Genus of flies

Aridonevra is a genus of tephritid or fruit flies in the family Tephritidae. There only one species in this genus are:

- Aridonevra cunnamullae Permkam & Hancock, 1995
