= Epacrocerus =

Scientific classification
- Domain: Eukaryota
- Kingdom: Animalia
- Phylum: Arthropoda
- Class: Insecta
- Order: Diptera
- Family: Tephritidae
- Subfamily: Phytalmiinae
- Tribe: Epacrocerini
- Genus: Epacrocerus; Hardy, 1982

Genus of flies

Epacrocerus is a genus of tephritid or fruit flies in the family Tephritidae.

== Species ==
- Epacrocerus apiculatus Hardy, 1982
- Epacrocerus maculatus Hardy, 1982
- Epacrocerus quadrivittatus Hardy, 1982
- Epacrocerus splendens Hardy, 1982
