= Neothemara =

Scientific classification
- Kingdom: Animalia
- Phylum: Arthropoda
- Class: Insecta
- Order: Diptera
- Family: Tephritidae
- Subfamily: Phytalmiinae
- Genus: Neothemara

Genus of flies

Neothemara is a genus of tephritid or fruit flies in the family Tephritidae.There are only two species from the genus that got recognizes:

- Neothemara digressa Hardy, 1986
- Neothemara formosipennis Walker, 1861
