= Ortaloptera =

Scientific classification
- Kingdom: Animalia
- Phylum: Arthropoda
- Class: Insecta
- Order: Diptera
- Family: Tephritidae
- Subfamily: Phytalmiinae
- Tribe: Phytalmiini
- Genus: Ortaloptera; Edwards, 1915

Genus of flies

Ortaloptera is a genus of tephritid or fruit flies in the family Tephritidae. There are two known species:

- Ortaloptera callistomyia Hering, 1941
- Ortaloptera cleitamina Edwards, 1915
