= Themarohystrix =

Scientific classification
- Kingdom: Animalia
- Phylum: Arthropoda
- Class: Insecta
- Order: Diptera
- Family: Tephritidae
- Subfamily: Phytalmiinae
- Genus: Themarohystrix; Hendel, 1914

Species
- Themarohystrix alpina; Themarohystrix bivittata; Themarohystrix flaviceps; Themarohystrix helomyzoides; Themarohystrix hyalina; Themarohystrix nigrifacies; Themarohystrix perkinsi; Themarohystrix suttoni; Themarohystrix variabilis

Genus of flies

Themarohystrix is a genus of tephritid or fruit flies in the family Tephritidae.
