= Langatia =

Scientific classification
- Kingdom: Animalia
- Phylum: Arthropoda
- Class: Insecta
- Order: Diptera
- Family: Tephritidae
- Subfamily: Phytalmiinae
- Genus: Langatia

Genus of flies

Langatia is a genus of tephritid or fruit flies in the family Tephritidae. There are only one species from the genus are:

- Langatia setinerva Hancock & Drew, 1995
