= Paraphasca =

Scientific classification
- Kingdom: Animalia
- Phylum: Arthropoda
- Class: Insecta
- Order: Diptera
- Family: Tephritidae
- Subfamily: Phytalmiinae
- Genus: Paraphasca

Genus of flies

Paraphasca is a genus of tephritid or fruit flies in the family Tephritidae.

- Paraphasca taenifera Hardy, 1986
