= Phorelliosoma =

Scientific classification
- Domain: Eukaryota
- Kingdom: Animalia
- Phylum: Arthropoda
- Class: Insecta
- Order: Diptera
- Family: Tephritidae
- Subfamily: Phytalmiinae
- Tribe: Acanthonevrini
- Genus: Phorelliosoma; Hendel, 1914

Genus of flies

Phorelliosoma is a genus of tephritid or fruit flies in the family Tephritidae.

== Species ==
- Phorelliosoma ambitiosum Hering, 1941
- Phorelliosoma hexachaeta Hendel, 1914
- Phorelliosoma hilaratum Hering, 1941
