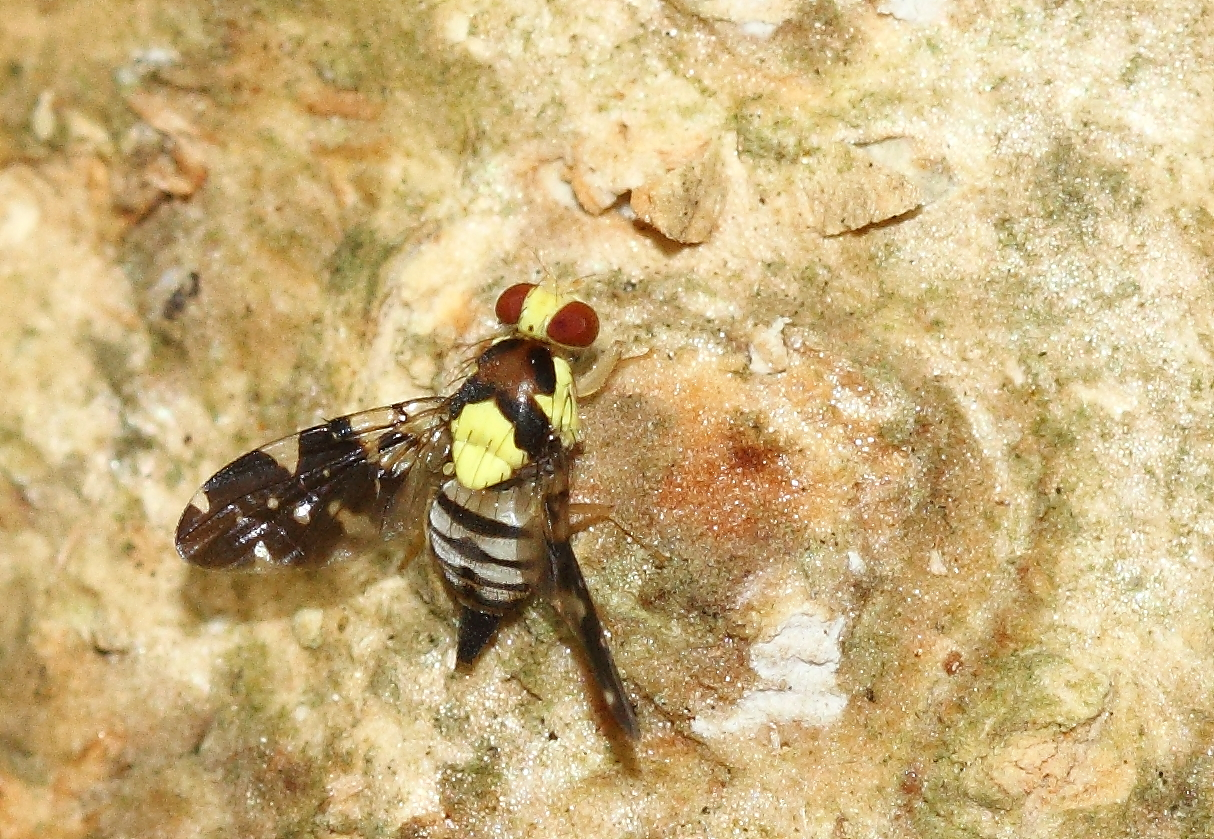
- Diarrhegma modestum

Scientific classification
- Kingdom: Animalia
- Phylum: Arthropoda
- Clade: Pancrustacea
- Class: Insecta
- Order: Diptera
- Family: Tephritidae
- Tribe: Acanthonevrini
- Genus: Diarrhegma; Bezzi, 1913

= Diarrhegma =

Genus of flies

Diarrhegma is a genus of tephritid or fruit flies in the family Tephritidae. There are three species:

- Diarrhegma bimaculata Xu, Liao & Zhang, 2009
- Diarrhegma modestum (Fabricius, 1805) - India, Sri Lanka
- Diarrhegma paritii (Doleschall, 1856) - Southeast Asia - Vietnam, Thailand, West Malaysia, Singapore, Borneo, Indonesia (Java, Sumba) and southern Philippines Philippines (Mindanao, Palawan);

Males offer a nuptial feeding gift to females in courtship. The secrete a foamy material from the mouth onto a leaf substrate which attracts the female. The male copulates after the female accepts the gift and begins to feed on it.
