= Enicopterina =

Scientific classification
- Kingdom: Animalia
- Phylum: Arthropoda
- Class: Insecta
- Order: Diptera
- Family: Tephritidae
- Subfamily: Trypetinae
- Genus: Enicopterina

Genus of flies

Enicopterina is a genus of tephritid or fruit flies in the family Tephritidae.There only one species from this genus are:

- Enicopterina bivittata Malloch, 1939
