= Ectopomyia =

Scientific classification
- Kingdom: Animalia
- Phylum: Arthropoda
- Class: Insecta
- Order: Diptera
- Family: Tephritidae
- Subfamily: Trypetinae
- Genus: Ectopomyia

Genus of flies

Ectopomyia is a genus of tephritid or fruit flies in the family Tephritidae.There only one species in this genus are:

- Ectopomyia baculigera Hardy, 1973
