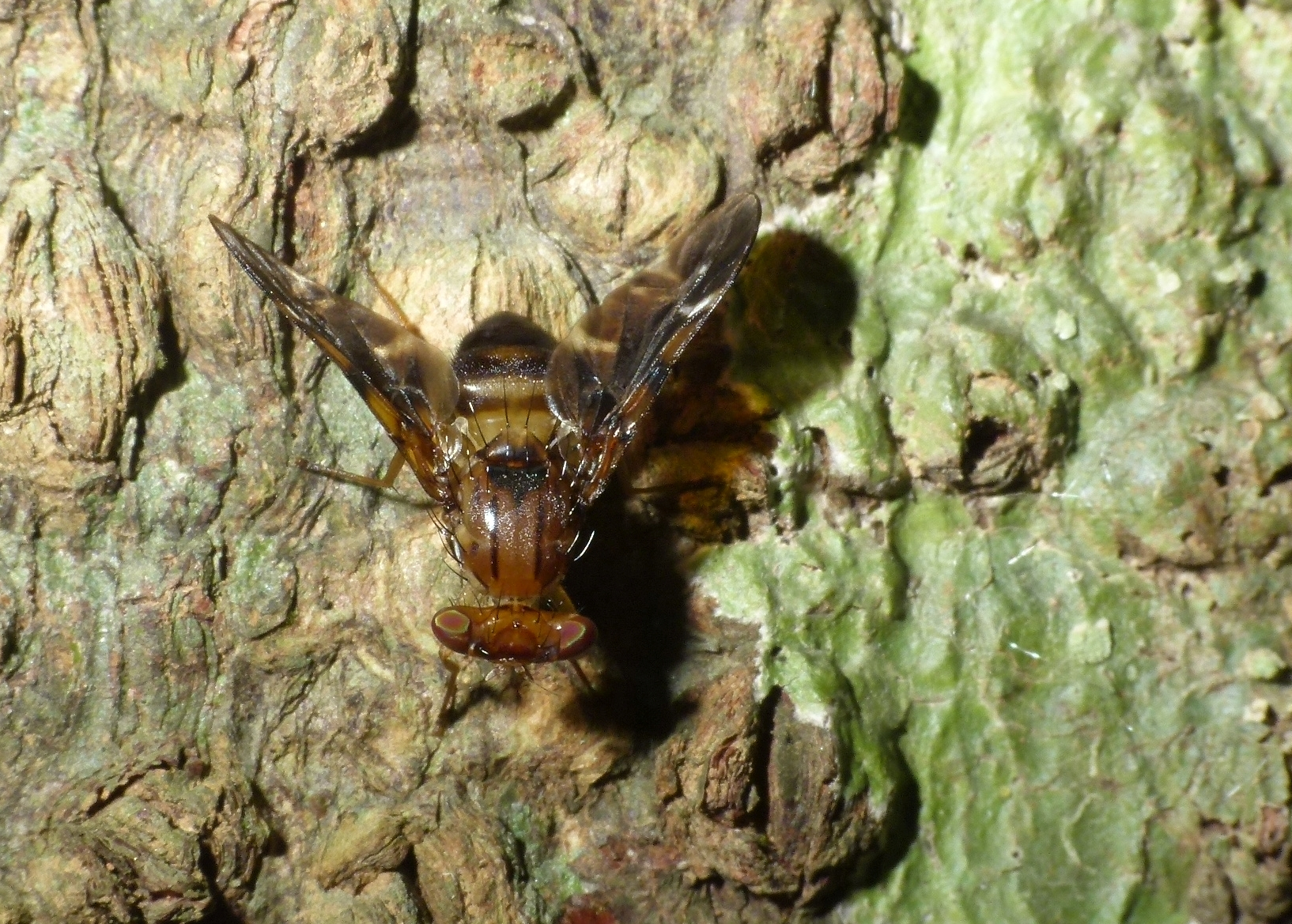
- Themara yunnana (Wynaad, India)

Scientific classification
- Kingdom: Animalia
- Phylum: Arthropoda
- Class: Insecta
- Order: Diptera
- Family: Tephritidae
- Genus: Themara; Walker, 1856

= Themara =

Genus of flies

Themara is a genus of tephritid or fruit flies in the family Tephritidae. Many species have the head elongated sideways with the eyes placed on the extensions. Their biology is largely unknown but are thought to breed on rotting wooden logs or tree trunks.

There are about 10 species distributed in South and Southeast Asia and include:

- T. alkestis Osten Sacken, 1882
- T. ampla Walker, 1856
- T. andamanensis Hancock & Whitmore, 2014
- T. enderleini Hering, 1938
- T. extraria Hering, 1952
- T. hirtipes Rondani, 1875
- T. hirsuta Perkins, 1938
- T. jacobsoni Meijere, 1916
- T. lunifera Hering, 1938
- T. maculipennis Westwood, 1847
- T. nigrifacies Perkins, 1938
- T. nigropunctulata Doleschall, 1858
- T. ostensackeni Hardy, 1974
- T. yunnana Zia, 1963
