= Hemiclusiosoma =

Scientific classification
- Kingdom: Animalia
- Phylum: Arthropoda
- Class: Insecta
- Order: Diptera
- Family: Tephritidae
- Subfamily: Trypetinae
- Genus: Hemiclusiosoma

Genus of flies

Hemiclusiosoma is a genus of tephritid or fruit flies in the family Tephritidae.There only one species from the genus are:

- Hemiclusiosoma trivittatum Hardy, 1986
