= Enoplopteron =

Scientific classification
- Kingdom: Animalia
- Phylum: Arthropoda
- Clade: Pancrustacea
- Class: Insecta
- Order: Diptera
- Family: Tephritidae
- Subfamily: Trypetinae
- Genus: Enoplopteron

Genus of flies

Enoplopteron is a genus of tephritid or fruit flies in the family Tephritidae.

== Species ==
- Enoplopteron hieroglyphicum Meijere, 1913
- Enoplopteron occulatum Hardy, 1986
- Enoplopteron reticulatum Hardy, 1986
