= Freyomyia =

Scientific classification
- Kingdom: Animalia
- Phylum: Arthropoda
- Class: Insecta
- Order: Diptera
- Family: Tephritidae
- Subfamily: Trypetinae
- Genus: Freyomyia

Genus of flies

Freyomyia is a genus of tephritid or fruit flies in the family Tephritidae.The only species in this genus are:

- Freyomyia bivittata Hardy 1974
