= Exallosophira =

Scientific classification
- Kingdom: Animalia
- Phylum: Arthropoda
- Class: Insecta
- Order: Diptera
- Family: Tephritidae
- Subfamily: Trypetinae
- Genus: Exallosophira

Genus of flies

Exallosophira is a genus of tephritid or fruit flies in the family Tephritidae. The genus solely consists of the species Exallosophira elegans.
