= D. formosa =

D. formosa may refer to:

- Derwentia formosa, a plant endemic to Tasmania
- Dicentra formosa, a plant native to North America
- Dryandra formosa, a shrub endemic to Western Australia
- Dryomyza formosa, an Asian fly
- Dysstroma formosa, a geometer moth
