= Oedoparena nigrifrons =

Scientific classification
- Kingdom: Animalia
- Phylum: Arthropoda
- Clade: Pancrustacea
- Class: Insecta
- Order: Diptera
- Family: Dryomyzidae
- Genus: Oedoparena
- Species: O. nigrifrons

Binomial name
- Oedoparena nigrifrons Mathis and Steyskal, 1980

Species of fly

Oedoparena nigrifrons is a coastal fly from the family Dryomyzidae. it is the only known dipterous predator of barnacles.

== Distribution ==
This is a Nearctic fly occurring from Central California to Alaska.

== Ecology ==
The ecology of this species is unknown, but it is suspected that it is the same as or similar to Oedoparena glauca where Eggs are deposited on the operculum of barnacle and fly larvae consume several barnacles during their development. Pupation then takes place in a now empty barnacle shell. The adult flies emerge during the morning low tide. Adults of Oedoparena glauca, and Oedoparena nigrifrons are found together in the same habit. It is possible that other members of the genus Oedoparena may have a similar lifestyle.
