= Oedoparena minor =

Scientific classification
- Kingdom: Animalia
- Phylum: Arthropoda
- Clade: Pancrustacea
- Class: Insecta
- Order: Diptera
- Family: Dryomyzidae
- Genus: Oedoparena
- Species: O. minor

Binomial name
- Oedoparena minor Suwa, 1981

Species of fly

Oedoparena minor is a small (wing length 4.0-6.4) coastal fly from the family Dryomyzidae.

== Distribution ==
Hokkaido, Japan.

== Ecology ==
The ecology of this species is little known, Adults have been reared from Pupa found in the empty shells of dead barnacles. This is not unlike the life style of a North American species Oedoparena glauca, where the larvae feed on living barnacle, before pupating in a now empty barnical shell and then the adult flies emerge during the morning low tide.
