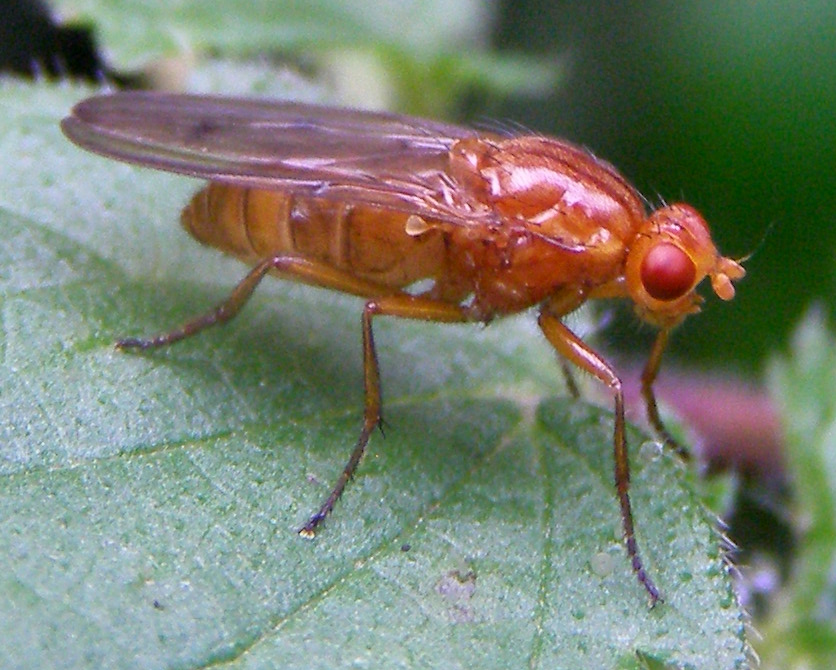
- Dryomyza anilis

Scientific classification
- Kingdom: Animalia
- Phylum: Arthropoda
- Clade: Pancrustacea
- Class: Insecta
- Order: Diptera
- Family: Dryomyzidae
- Subfamily: Dryomyzinae
- Genus: Dryomyza
- Species: D. anilis

Binomial name
- Dryomyza anilis Fallén, 1820

Synonyms
- Dryope liturata Robineau-Desvoidy, 1830; Neuroctena anilis Rondani, 1868; Dryomyza pallida Day, 1881; Dryomyza melanacme Kurahashi, 1981

= Dryomyza anilis =

Species of fly

Dryomyza anilis is a common fly from the family Dryomyzidae. The fly is found through various areas in the Northern hemisphere and has brown and orange coloration with distinctive large red eyes. The life span of the fly is not known, but laboratory-reared males can live 28–178 days. D. anilis has recently been placed back in the genus Dryomyza, of which it is the type species. Dryomyzidae were previously part of Sciomyzidae but are now considered a separate family with two subfamilies.

Male D. anilis engage in territorial behavior, guarding carcasses to attract potential mates. Males also guard females, and conflicts over females are frequent. Females typically mate with multiple males. Mating occurs through several rounds of copulation and egg-laying. During mating, males engage in a series of "tapping" rituals where they use their claspers to tap the female's genitals, increasing the chance of them fertilizing the female's eggs. Females lay several batches of eggs on carcasses, fungi, and excrement as well as other substrates.

== Description ==
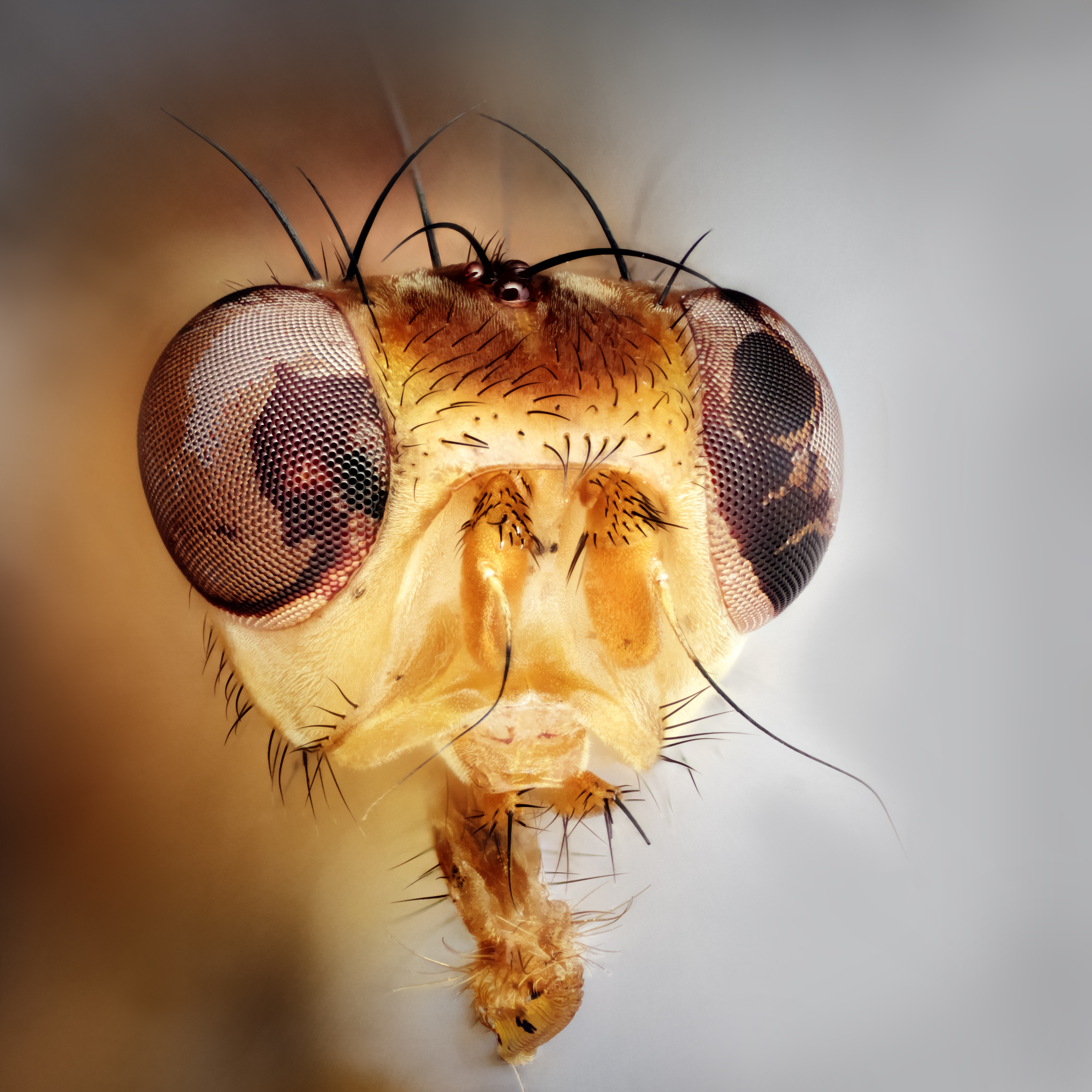
Face of Dryomyza anilis, depicting the fly's large red eyes

D. anilis adults are medium-sized, ranging in overall length from 7–14 mm, but are typically 12 mm long. Their coloration is light-brown and orange with large red eyes. Generally, the species can be separated from other species of Dryomyzidae by their nearly-bare arista (apical bristle), covered lunule (a crescent-shaped mark, found around the wing margins), and developed prostigmatic and prescutellar bristles.

Dryomyzidae are characterized by closely spaced first antennal segments, a protruding oral margin, a strap-shaped or oral prosternum that is not joined to the propleura, and a lack of costal spines. D. anilis have short posterior spiracular tubes, lack hooks on their posterior spiracular plates, and have well-developed tubercles on segment 12 only.

The fly's life span is between 28 and 178 days in the laboratory.

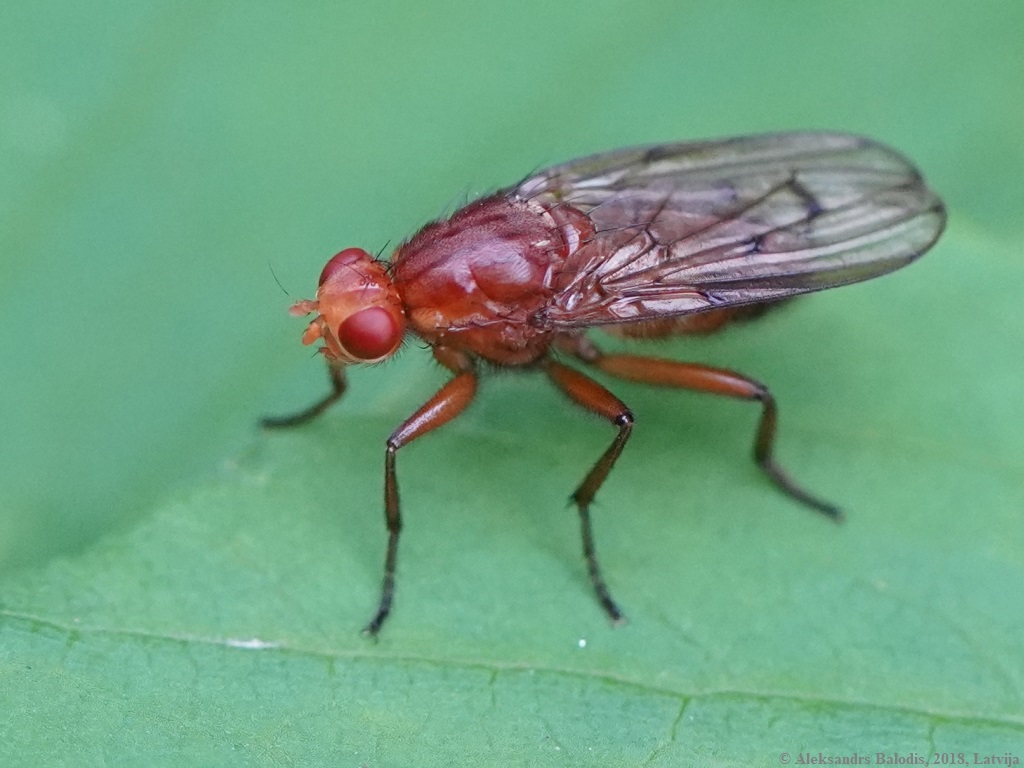
Wing markings of Dryomyza anilis

=== Taxonomy ===
Adult morphology indicates that Dromyzidae, Helcomyzidae, and Helosciomyzidae are more closely related to each other than they are to Sciomyzoidea. Therefore, though Dryomyzidae were previously part of Sciomyzidae, the family is now considered separate and has two subfamilies: Dryomyzinae and Helcomyzidae. There are two genera, Droymyza with ten species and Oedoparena with two species that are presently recognized. Moreover, as compared to other Dryomyza species found in the eastern United States (Dryope decipita and Dryomyza simplex), D. anilis is the most common species and has the strongest wing markings.

== Distribution ==
D. anilis is Holarctic, present in Canada and many northern states of the United States in the Nearctic realm. The fly is also widespread in the Palearctic realm from the United Kingdom to Japan. Within the United Kingdom, the fly is common and widespread in England and Wales, but is less common in Scotland. D. anilis are typically most prevalent in the wild from May to September.

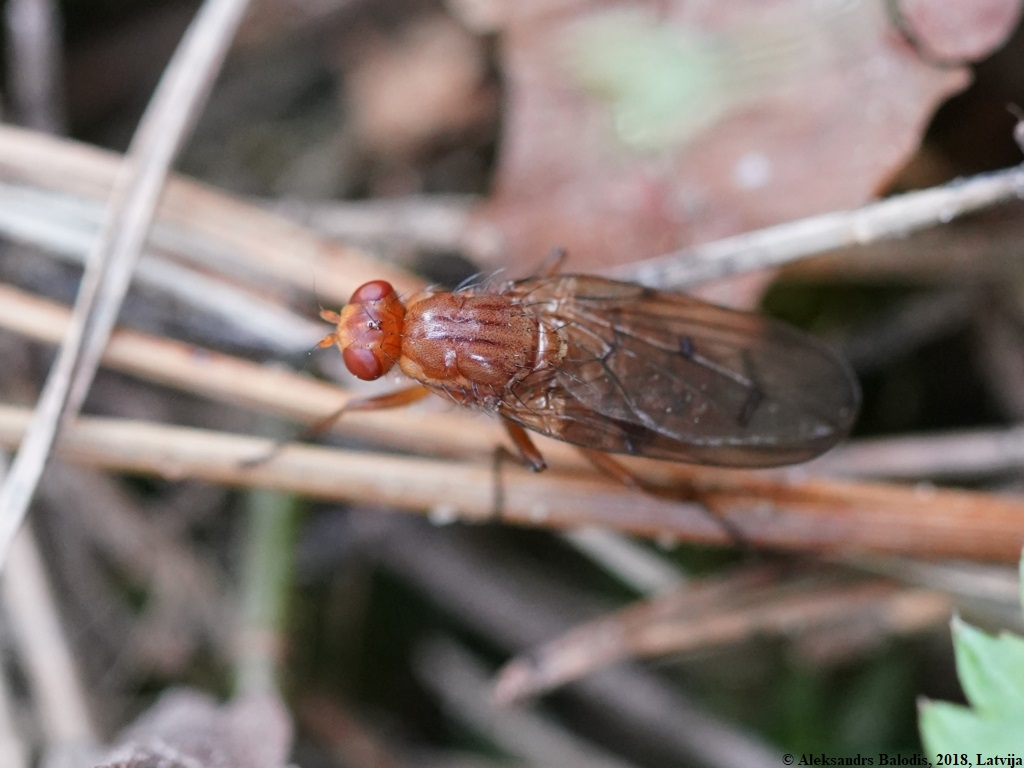
Dryomyza anilis in its natural habitat: low-laying, moist vegetation

Adult flies are found in moist, shady habitats among low-growing vegetation and excrement. Adult habitats have been found in human excrement, fox and pheasant carrion, and malodorous stinkhorn fungi. Eggs have been found in human excrement, and larvae have been found in pheasant carrion. D. anilis can develop from egg to pupa on dead animal matter but not on decaying plant matter. Experimentally placed larvae were unable to attain maturity when grown on rotting grass, decaying pumpkin flesh, decaying lettuce, or cow manure. They did attain maturity when grown on hamburger, dead earthworms, dead crane flies, dead polygrid snails, a dead milkweed caterpillar, a dead slug, and rotting agaric mushrooms.

== Behavior ==
=== Territoriality ===
One defining characteristic of D. anilis is the males' territorial behavior. Males defend egg-laying females as well as small carcasses where females feed and lay their eggs. Other males will challenge the territorial males for access to territory and/or females resulting in either take-over of the resource, or expulsion from the resource. Larger males are more likely to win resource conflicts, and the largest males tend to hold territories. Males will spend more time defending females than territory, suggesting that males view females as a more valuable resource than territories.

Larger carcasses tend attract many males, some of which will defend distinct territories on the carcass. However, once the density of males surpasses a certain stage, fewer males will attempt to take control of territory; territorial behavior decreases as the intensity of competing males increases.

=== Mating ===
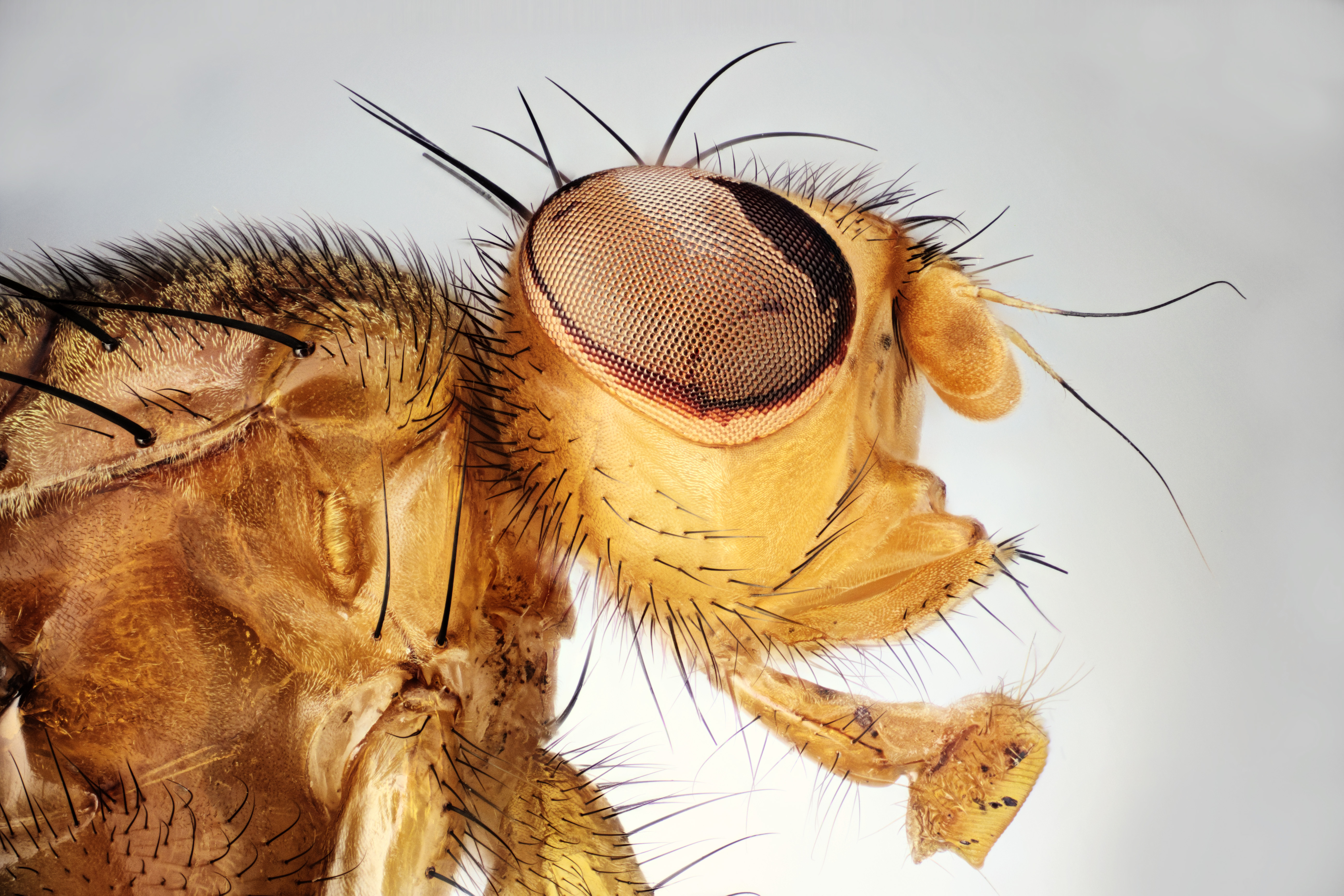
Dryomyza anilis adult male

D. anilis typically mate when a female approaches a carcass to feed. A male around the carcass initiates mating by mounting a female in a particular position. The tip of the male's abdomen and his hind legs spread the female's wings, while the remaining legs grasp the female's wings, abdomen, and the substrate they're standing on during mating. Mating then consists of several cycles of copulation and egg-laying. The pair walk away from the carcass and copulate, then the female returns to the carcass and lays her eggs while being defended by the male. This repeats for up to six cycles of copulation and egg-laying, following which the female typically leaves the carcass while the male remains.

Copulation itself is a distinct ritual. First, the male's aedeagus is inserted into the female's genital tract for about a minute, then removed while the male remains mounted. Following a brief motionless pause, the male initiates a series of tapping movements, rhythmically tapping the female's external genitalia with his claspers around 20 times, followed by a single, longer moment of contact. The pair then remain motionless for around two minutes, before another tapping cycle begins. This tapping cycle will be repeated 8-31 times in a mating, with the majority of tapping sequences during the first copulation bout. Tapping increases fertilization success, likely by influencing how the male's sperm is distributed in the female's reproductive tract; males that were removed before they could perform the tapping ritual were drastically less successful at fertilizing eggs than males allowed to engage in tapping. Larger males tend to engage in more tapping sequences and have higher fertilization success, either due to their size or due to female preference for large males.

During copulation, male sperm is deposited into a storage organ called the bursa copulatrix. Sperm from previous matings is mostly stored in doublet storage tubes called spermathecae, while sperm from the most recent mating is typically in a separate singlet spermatheca. During male tapping, sperm is moved into the singlet spermatheca, and typically females use the sperm from the singlet spermatheca during egg-laying. For this reason, males maximize reproductive success by ensuring that they are the last to mate with a given female; the final male to mate with a female before egg-laying is substantially more likely to fertilize her eggs. Eggs laid in the last oviposition bout are the most likely to survive.

D. anilis males and females select mates to some degree based on certain characteristics. Males expend more resources on females with mature eggs, engaging in more tapping sequences and copulation bouts. Males can assess the female's egg status by pressing their hind legs against the female's abdomen. Males will reject females without mature eggs. Similarly, females display various behaviors to avoid mating with unwanted males. If mounted by an unwanted male, a female may turn her abdomen downward as well as walk, kick, shake, or roll to dislodge the male. Female D. anilis are polyandrous and will often mate with several males while discharging a single batch of eggs. Females can store enough sperm for two egg batches, and therefore mating before each egg-laying is time-consuming and unnecessary, exposing females to risk of predation, disease, and injury during male-male conflicts. However, the multiple matings give the female access to the resources of territory-holding males, such as food and egg-laying sites, and mating with territory-holding males may allow the female to be defended while she lays her eggs. Larger females tend to mate with fewer males and engage in fewer copulation cycles during each mating, which may give them an advantage over smaller females.

== Life history ==
=== Egg ===
D. anilis eggs are about 1.25 mm long and 0.45 mm wide, elongated and tapered at one end. They are creamy white in color. Eggs have sets of protrusions called flanges that appear in pairs from the back and side surfaces. These flanges are rounded on the front end, and more pointed on the back end. Apart from these flanges, the surface of the egg is covered in a pattern of fine, hexagonal lines. The structure of the egg is adapted to survive on the different kinds of substrates upon which eggs are laid. The egg's flanges are adapted to allow it to float on the surface of a liquid substrate. Moreover, the chorion takes on the color of the substrate that it is laid on, affording the egg camouflage and protection from predators. Eggs are laid one at a time on a moist surface, sometimes side-by-side. The lower surface of the egg is shiny and sticky. The incubation period for eggs is relatively short, typically around 24 hours. At eclosion, the chorion of the egg splits, breaking the outermost covering and allowing the larva to escape. The young larvae then search for a soft spot or crevice into which they can burrow.

=== Larva ===
At the first instar stage of the larvae, the insect is 1.67–2.96 mm long and 0.41–0.59 mm wide. Anterior spiracles (openings on the outer covering) are not yet present, while pale yellow posterior spiracles have developed. Four sets of peripheral processes are present. An important component of fly anatomy is the cephalopharyngeal skeleton. The skeleton usually has one or two mouth hooks to allow the fly to move and feed. As the fly matures, its cephalopharyngeal skeleton also modifies with time to maximize the fly's ability to take in nutrients. A set of muscles called the cibarial dilator muscles connect to the skeleton and function to lift the roof of the pharynx, widening the lumen and allowing for more space. At the first instar stage, the cephalopharyngeal skeleton is brown-black in color and 0.28–0.33 mm long. The segments vary in pigmentation but contain 3–4 rows of dark pigmentation and are followed by a series of smaller, colorless spinules that extend from the outer edge of the larvae's body to the midline. Lateral bars fuse together to form a mouth-hook-like structure.

The second instar is similar to the third instar larva. The length at this point ranges from 2.74 to 4.71 mm, with a maximum width of around 0.61–0.91 mm. Anterior spiracles are now present and are a pale yellow color. There is a plate, found on the front surface of the fly, curved upwards at both ends. The cephalopharyngeal skeleton is 0.57–0.61 mm long. Mandibular sclerites (hardened portions of the exoskeletons) exist as long, narrow, mouth-hooks that appear triangular from a side-view. Dentary sclerites located next to the mandible are pointed down, and are lightly pigmented towards the back of the fly. Small sclerites are present between the mandibular ones, and an additional sclerite is found on the posterior end near the hypostome (a structure found near the mouth which allows an animal to anchor itself firmly on another to suck, as in the tick's hypostome).

The third instar stage is 4.10–9.42 mm long and 0.76–2.13 mm wide. The integument is translucent, the body's overall shape comes to resemble a mix between a cone, and cylinder (with the front end of the insect becoming more pointed). Tubercules are no longer present from segments 1–11. The cephalopharyngeal skeleton is dark brown-black and 0.93–1.05 mm long. Mandibular sclerites are well-developed and present in pairs on either end of the body. Dentary sclerites are also paired and found separately near the margin of the mandibular sclerites. The hypostomal sclerite is not fused with any others and has anterior rami—particular branches—that are wider than on its posterior side.

=== Pupa ===
At its next stage, the larvae turns into a pupa. The puparium (the hardened exoskeleton that protects the pupa) is long and narrow, measuring 4.41-6.23 mm long and 1.75-2.51 mm wide. The pupa is light yellow-brown to reddish brown, with segments 2-4 and 12 darker than the remainder. Spinules are arranged in the same manner as in the 3rd-instar larva. The pupa has dark yellow-brown to reddish-brown posterior spiracular plates and a darker spiracular scar. The anal plate is also a darker reddish-brown, and invaginated, forming a pouch. The cephalopharyngeal skeleton also appears similar to the 3rd-instar larva stage.

== Ecology ==
D. anilis can survive on food sources ranging from insects and vertebrates to rotting fungi. Pharyngeal ridges in the skeletons of larvae suggest that larvae derive nutrition from micro-organisms in the rotting organic food source. These ridges selectively sift through their food supply, ensuring that only nutritious food enters. Larvae that feed on living tissue do not have these pharyngeal ridges. The short incubation period of the fly (around 24 hours) may provide a competitive advantage in exploiting limited resources. No predators or parasites of D. anilis have yet been studied, but experimentally several larvae of Mydaea urbana were able to destroy a large population of D. anilis on human excrement.

=== Conservation ===
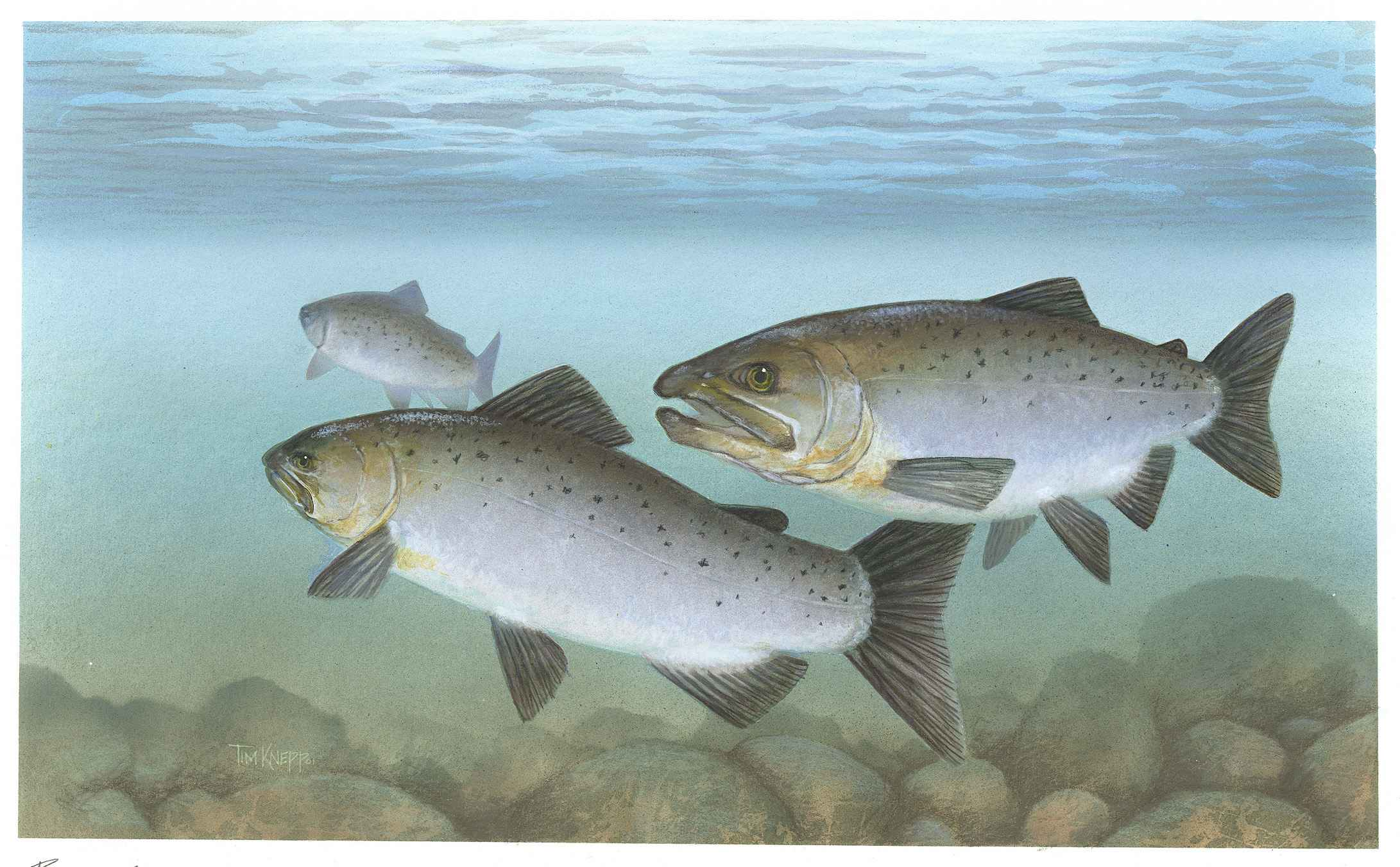
Drawing of Pacific salmon, genus Oncorhynchus

D. anilis serve as saprophages in the ecosystem. D. anilis, together with Calliphora terraenovae, were found using Pacific salmon carcasses as a food source and egg-laying substrate for D. anilis in the coastal North Pacific. Therefore, there is concern that continued decline in salmon populations could threaten D. anilis and other salmon-dependent communities.
