= Melander =

Melander is a surname. Notable people with the surname include:

== People ==
- Anders Melander of Nationalteatern, Swedish progg rock group from the 1970s that featured leftist political lyrics
- Ann Melander (born 1961), Swedish former alpine skier who competed in the 1980 and 1984 Winter Olympics
- Axel Leonard Melander (1878–1962), American entomologist specialising in Diptera and Hymenoptera
- Daniel Melanderhjelm, originally Daniel Melander, (1726–1810), Swedish mathematician and astronomer
- Dennis Melander (born 1983), Swedish footballer
- Elisabeth Charlotte Melander (1640–1707), Countess of Holzappel from 1648 to 1707 and Schaumburg from 1656 to 1707
- Eva Melander (born 1974), Swedish actress
- Hilda Melander (born 1991), Swedish tennis player
- Johan Melander (1910–1989), Norwegian banker
- Jon Melander, retired American football offensive guard
- Peter Melander Graf von Holzappel (1589–1648), Protestant military leader in the Thirty Years' War, Chief of the imperial troops of the League of 1647
- Sven Melander (1947–2022), Swedish journalist, comedian, TV show host and actor

== Fictional characters ==
- Frederik Melander, character in a series of ten novels by Maj Sjöwall and Per Wahlöö, collectively titled The Story of a Crime

== See also ==
- Dryomyza melander, a fly from the family Dryomyzidae
- Eudamias melander or black-veined mylon (Mylon maimon), a butterfly of the family Hesperiidae
- Melan
- Meland Municipality
- Melanderia
