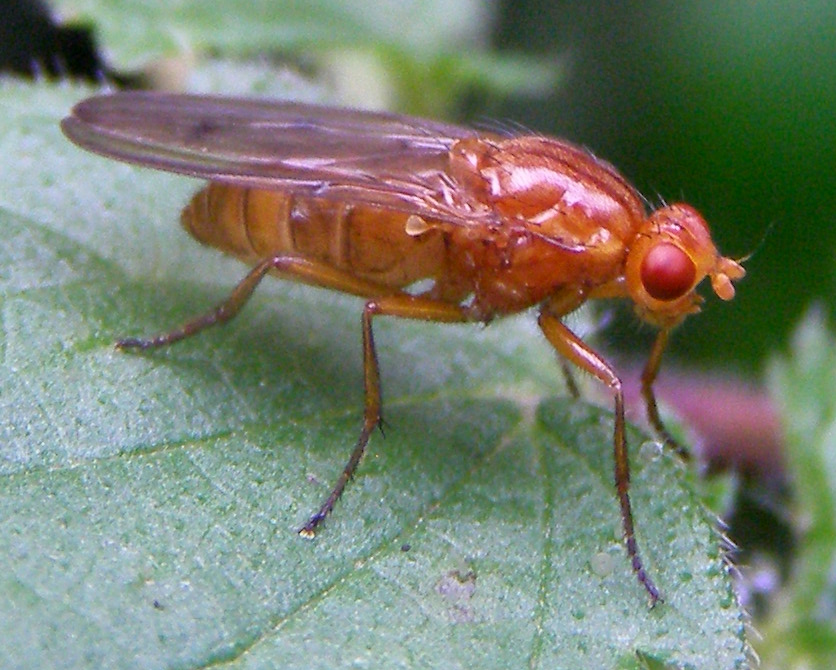
- Dryomyza anilis

Scientific classification
- Domain: Eukaryota
- Kingdom: Animalia
- Phylum: Arthropoda
- Class: Insecta
- Order: Diptera
- Family: Dryomyzidae
- Subfamily: Dryomyzinae
- Genus: Dryomyza; Fallén, 1820

Type species
- Dryomyza anilis Fallén, 1820

Species
- See text

Synonyms
- Neuroctena Rondani, 1868; Stenodryomyza Hendel, 1937

= Dryomyza =

Genus of flies

Dryomyza is a genus of flies from the family Dryomyzidae. There are 11 known species of which 2 are fossils.

== Species ==
- D. amblia Kurahashi, 1981
- D. anilis Fallén, 1820
- D. badia Kurahashi, 1981
- D. caucasica Ozerov, 1987
- D. ecalcarata Kurahashi, 1981
- D. formosa (Wiedemann, 1830)
- D. pakistana Kurahashi, 1989
- †D. pelidua Statz, 1940
- D. puellaris Steyskal, 1957
- †D. shanwangensis Zhang, 1989
- D. simplex Loew, 1862
- D. takae Azuma, 2001
