= Pseudoneuroctena =

Scientific classification
- Kingdom: Animalia
- Phylum: Arthropoda
- Class: Insecta
- Order: Diptera
- Family: Dryomyzidae
- Subfamily: Dryomyzinae
- Genus: Pseudoneuroctena; Ozerov, 1987
- Species: P. senilis

Binomial name
- Pseudoneuroctena senilis (Zetterstedt, 1846)

Genus of flies

Pseudoneuroctena is a monotypic genus of flies from the family Dryomyzidae. The only species is Pseudoneuroctena senilis.

== Distribution ==
Known from the Palearctic and Nearctic realms.
