= Dryope (fly) =

- Dryope flaveola male (video)

Scientific classification
- Domain: Eukaryota
- Kingdom: Animalia
- Phylum: Arthropoda
- Class: Insecta
- Order: Diptera
- Family: Dryomyzidae
- Subfamily: Dryomyzinae
- Genus: Dryope; Robineau-Desvoidy, 1830

Type species
- Dryope communis Robineau-Desvoidy, 1830

Species
- See text

Synonyms
- Driope Rondani, 1868

Genus of flies

Dryope is a genus of flies from the family Dryomyzidae. There are 3 known species.

== Species ==
- Dryope decrepita (Zetterstedt, 1838)
- Dryope flaveola (Fabricius, 1794)
- Dryope melanderi (Steyskal, 1957)
