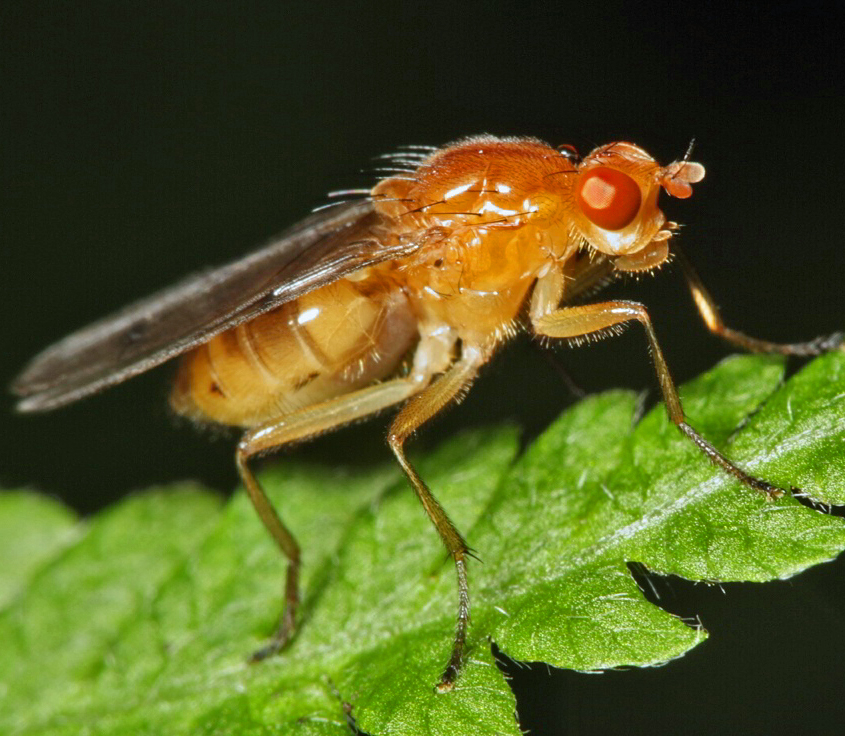
- Dryomyzid fly - Dryomyza sp.

Scientific classification
- Kingdom: Animalia
- Phylum: Arthropoda
- Clade: Pancrustacea
- Class: Insecta
- Order: Diptera
- Superfamily: Sciomyzoidea
- Family: Dryomyzidae; Schiner, 1862

Genera
- See text

= Dryomyzidae =

Family of flies

The Dryomyzidae are a small family of flies ranging from 4–18 mm long, with prominent bristles, and yellow to brown or rust-yellow coloring. The wings are very large. The subcosta is complete and well separated from vein 1. Larvae feed on decaying organic matter - carrion, dung, and fungi. The prelambrum protrudes from the oral cavity. Vibrissae are absent and the postvertical bristles are divergent.

The roughly 22 species are placed in 6 genera (with two additional genera known only as fossils). Dryomyzid flies are found principally in the Holarctic, though some are found in the Southern Hemisphere. Very little is known of the habits of the adults or immatures, but adults are found in moist, shady habits among low-growing vegetation.

== Classification ==
- Subfamily: Dryomyzinae Schiner, 1862
  - Genus: Dryomyza Fallén, 1820
    - D. amblia Kurahashi, 1981
    - D. anilis Fallén, 1820
    - D. badia Kurahashi, 1981
    - D. caucasica Ozerov, 1987
    - D. ecalcarata Kurahashi, 1981
    - D. formosa (Wiedemann, 1830)
    - D. pakistana Kurahashi, 1989
    - †D. pelidua Statz, 1940
    - D. puellaris Steyskal, 1957
    - †D. shanwangensis Zhang, 1989
    - D. simplex Loew, 1862
    - D. takae Azuma, 2001
  - Genus: Dryope Robineau-Desvoidy, 1830
    - D. decrepita (Zetterstedt, 1838)
    - D. flaveola (Fabricius, 1794)
    - D. melanderi (Steyskal, 1957)
  - Genus: Oedoparena Curran, 1934
    - O. glauca (Coquillett, 1900)
    - O. minor Suwa, 1981
    - O. nigrifrons Mathis and Steyskal, 1980
  - Genus: †Palaeotimia Meunier, 1908
    - †P. ihoesti Meunier, 1908
  - Genus: Paradryomyza Ozerov, 1987
    - P. orientalis Ozerov & Sueyoshi, 2002
    - P. setosa (Bigot, 1886)
    - P. spinigera Ozerov, 1987
    - P. steyskali Ozerov & Sueyoshi, 2002
  - Genus: †Prodryomyza Hennig, 1965
    - †P. electrica Hennig, 1965
  - Genus: Pseudoneuroctena Ozerov, 1987
    - P. senilis (Zetterstedt, 1846)
  - Genus: Steyskalomyza Kurahashi, 1982
    - S. hasegawai Kurahashi, 1982

Nomina dubia

- D. dubia Macquart, 1844
- D. maculipes Walker, 1861

== Fossil record ==
Only four fossil species in three genera (all from the Tertiary) are known.

== Distribution/species lists ==
- West Palaearctic
- Nearctic
- Japan

== Identification ==
- Steyskal GC (1957) A revision of the family Dryomyzidae (Diptera,. Acalyptratae). Pap. Mich. Acad. Sci. 42:55–68. World revision. Species keys.
- Czerny, L. (1930), Dryomyzidae und Neottiophilidae. 38b. In: Lindner, E. (Ed.). Die Fliegen der Paläarktischen Region 5(1): 1–18. Keys to Palaearctic species (in German).
