= Steyskalomyza =

Scientific classification
- Kingdom: Animalia
- Phylum: Arthropoda
- Class: Insecta
- Order: Diptera
- Family: Dryomyzidae
- Subfamily: Dryomyzinae
- Genus: Steyskalomyza; Kurahashi, 1982
- Species: S. hasegawai

Binomial name
- Steyskalomyza hasegawai Kurahashi, 1982

Genus of flies

Steyskalomyza is a monotypic genus of flies from the family Dryomyzidae. The only species is Steyskalomyza hasegawai.

== Distribution ==
Known only from Japan in the Palearctic.
