= Dryomyza simplex =

Scientific classification
- Kingdom: Animalia
- Phylum: Arthropoda
- Clade: Pancrustacea
- Class: Insecta
- Order: Diptera
- Family: Dryomyzidae
- Subfamily: Dryomyzinae
- Genus: Dryomyza
- Species: D. simplex

Binomial name
- Dryomyza simplex Loew, 1862

Synonyms
- Neuroctena ruthae Brimley, 1925

Species of fly

Dryomyza simplex is a fly from the family Dryomyzidae.

== Distribution ==
Found in the Nearctic realm of the United States and Canada.
