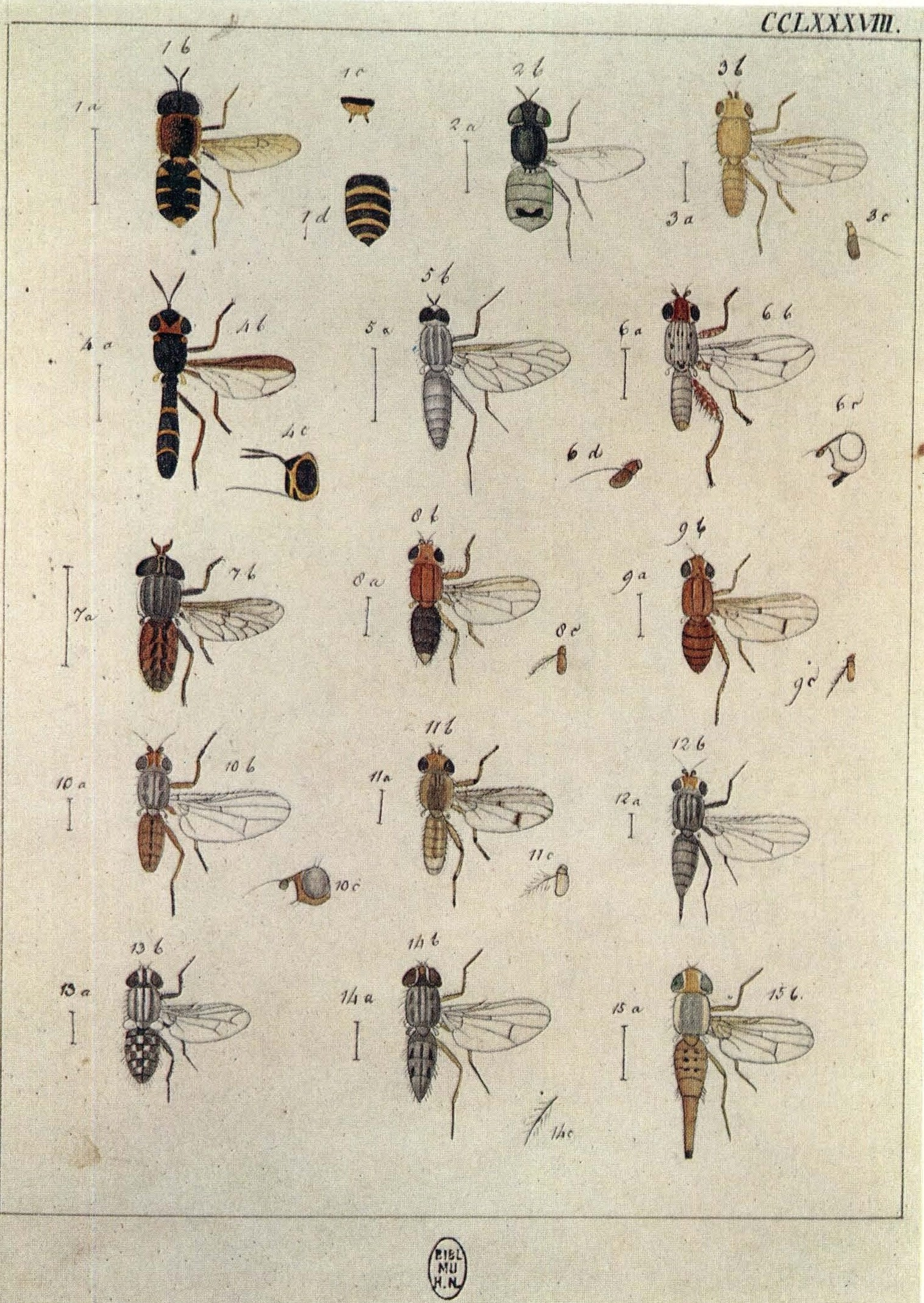

Scientific classification
- Kingdom: Animalia
- Phylum: Arthropoda
- Clade: Pancrustacea
- Class: Insecta
- Order: Diptera
- Family: Dryomyzidae
- Genus: Dryope
- Species: D. flaveola

Binomial name
- Dryope flaveola (Fabricius, 1794)

Synonyms
- Musca flaveola Fabricius, 1794; Dryomyza vetula Fallén, 1820; Dryope communis Robineau-Desvoidy, 1830; Dryomyza mollis Haliday, 1833; Dryomyza zawadskii Schummel, 1834; Dryomyza fuscicornis Meigen, 1838

= Dryope flaveola =

Species of fly

Dryope flaveola is a fly from the family Dryomyzidae. It has recently been placed in the genus Dryope, having been more widely known as Dryomyza flaveola.

== Distribution ==
Dryope flaveola male on Impatiens

This is a western Palearctic fly, found in Austria, Belarus, Belgium, Czech Republic, Denmark, France, Germany, Great Britain, Hungary, Ireland, Italy, Lithuania, Netherlands, Poland, Slovakia, Sweden, Switzerland, European Russia, and Ukraine.
