= Dryope decrepita =

Scientific classification
- Kingdom: Animalia
- Phylum: Arthropoda
- Clade: Pancrustacea
- Class: Insecta
- Order: Diptera
- Family: Dryomyzidae
- Genus: Dryope
- Species: D. decrepita

Binomial name
- Dryope decrepita (Zetterstedt, 1838)

Synonyms
- Dryomyza decrepita Zetterstedt, 1838; Dryomyza dayi Cresson, 1920; Dryomyza ferruginea Melander, 1920

Species of fly

Dryope decrepita is a fly from the family Dryomyzidae. It has recently been placed in the genus Dryope, having been more widely known as Dryomyza decrepita.

== Distribution ==
This is a Holarctic species, occurring in Canada and many northern states of the United States in the Nearctic realm, and very widespread in the Palearctic realm from the United Kingdom to Japan.
