= Paradryomyza =

Scientific classification
- Kingdom: Animalia
- Phylum: Arthropoda
- Class: Insecta
- Order: Diptera
- Family: Dryomyzidae
- Subfamily: Dryomyzinae
- Genus: Paradryomyza; Ozerov, 1987

Type species
- Odontomera setosa Bigot, 1886

Species
- See text

Genus of flies

Paradryomyza is a genus of flies from the family Dryomyzidae. There are 4 known species.

== Distribution ==
For a small geneus they are widespread, living in the Indomalayan (P. orientalis, P. steyskali), Palearctic (P. setosa) and Nearctic (P. setosa, P. spinigera) realms.

== Species ==
- Paradryomyza orientalis Ozerov & Sueyoshi, 2002
- Paradryomyza setosa (Bigot, 1886)
- Paradryomyza spinigera Ozerov, 1987
- Paradryomyza steyskali Ozerov & Sueyoshi, 2002
