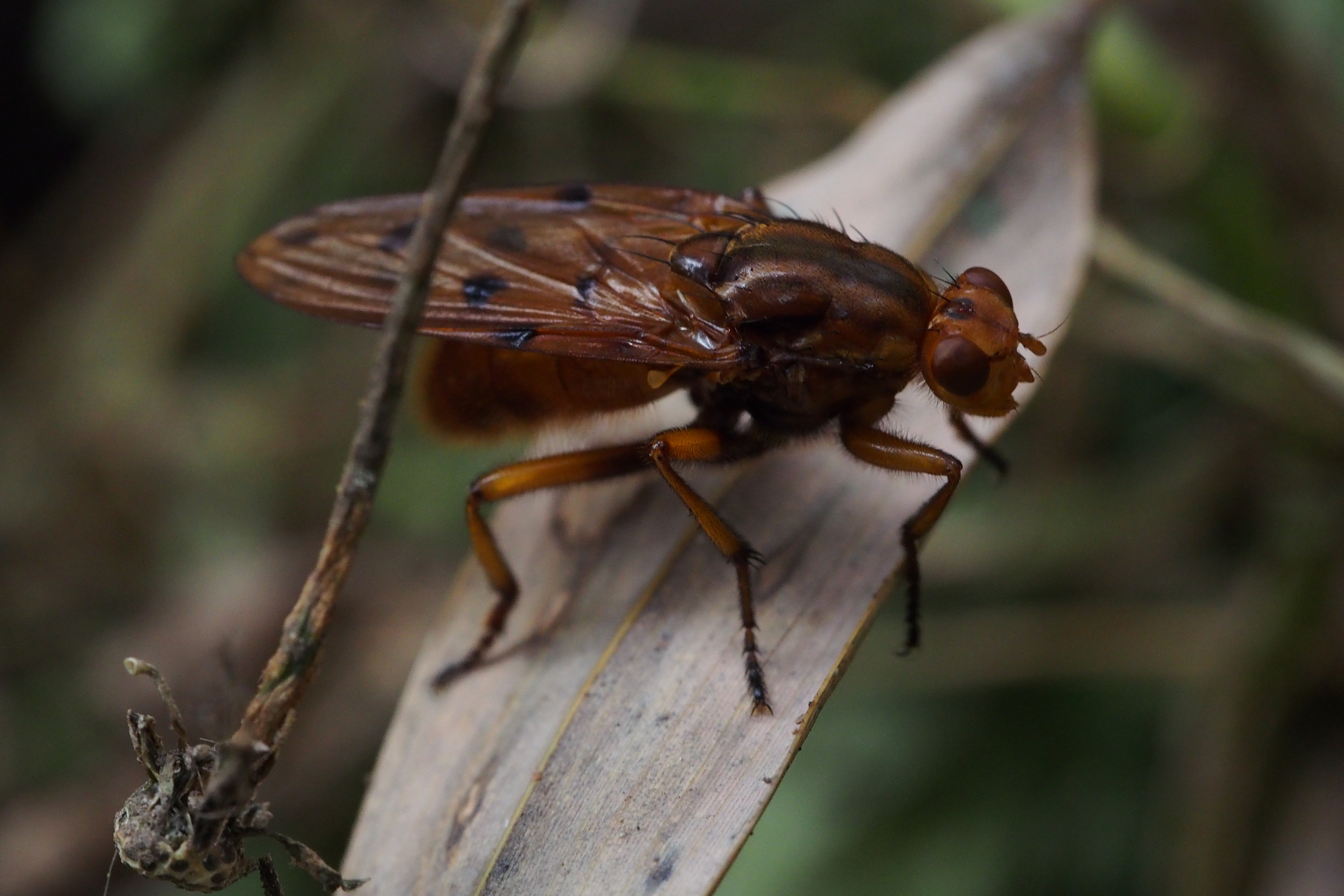

Scientific classification
- Kingdom: Animalia
- Phylum: Arthropoda
- Clade: Pancrustacea
- Class: Insecta
- Order: Diptera
- Family: Dryomyzidae
- Subfamily: Dryomyzinae
- Genus: Dryomyza
- Species: D. formosa

Binomial name
- Dryomyza formosa (Wiedemann, 1830)

Synonyms
- Scatophaga formosa Wiedemann, 1830; Dryomyza maculipennis Macquart, 1851; Dryomyza gigas Snellen von Vollenhoven, 1862

= Dryomyza formosa =

Species of fly

Dryomyza formosa is a fly from the family Dryomyzidae.

== Distribution ==
Found in the Indomalayan realm (India, Taiwan, and Vietnam), and very widespread in the Palearctic realm (China, Japan, Korea, and Russian Far East).
