= Oedoparena =

Scientific classification
- Kingdom: Animalia
- Phylum: Arthropoda
- Clade: Pancrustacea
- Class: Insecta
- Order: Diptera
- Family: Dryomyzidae
- Subfamily: Dryomyzinae
- Genus: Oedoparena; Curran, 1934

Type species
- Oedoparea glauca Coquillett, 1900

Species
- See text

Genus of flies

Oedoparena is a small genus of flies from the family Dryomyzidae. They are the only known dipterous predators of marine barnacles. There are only three known species.

== Species ==
- Oedoparena glauca (Coquillett, 1900)
- Oedoparena minor Suwa, 1981
- Oedoparena nigrifrons Mathis and Steyskal, 1980
