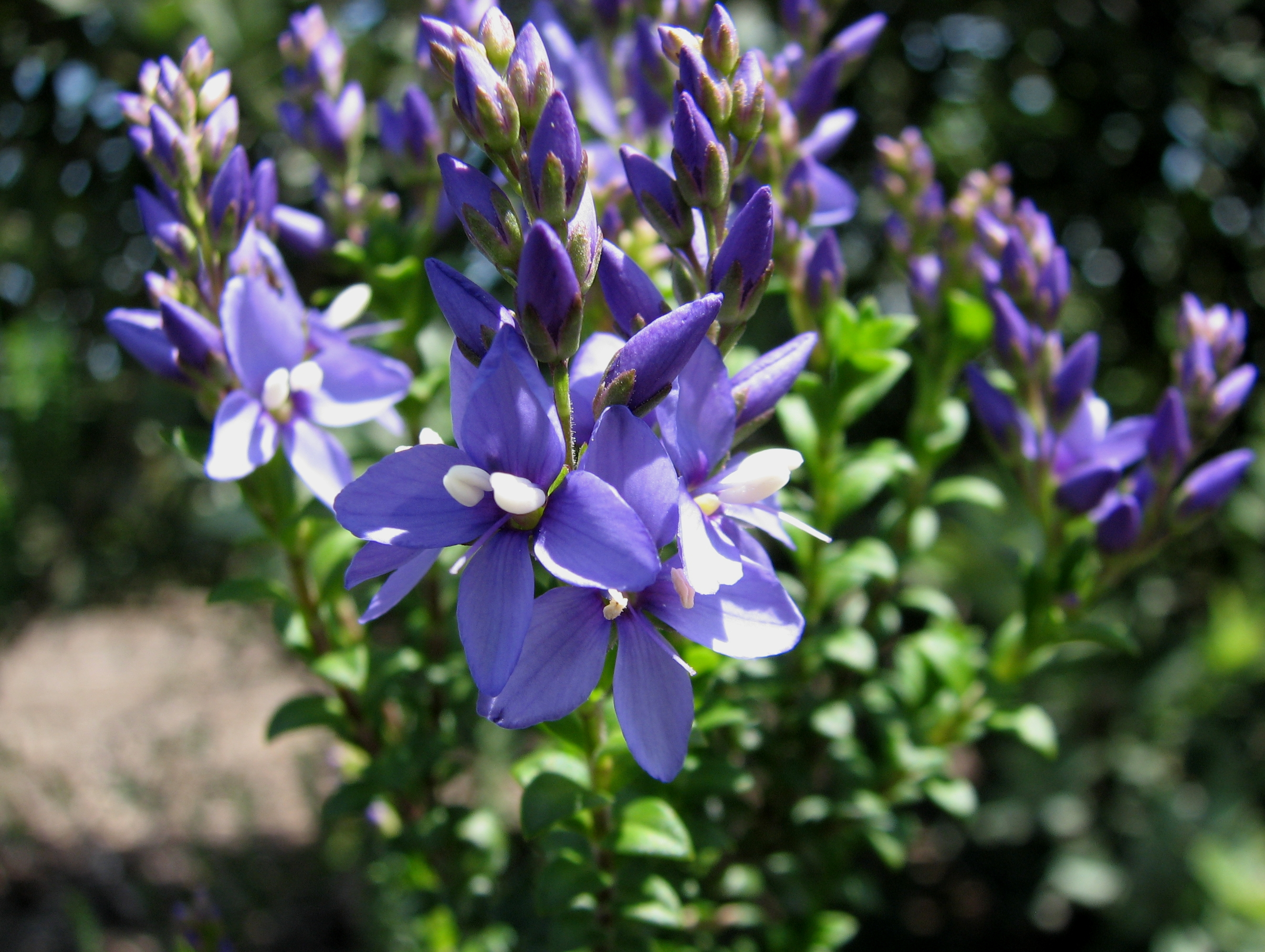

Scientific classification
- Kingdom: Plantae
- Clade: Embryophytes
- Clade: Tracheophytes
- Clade: Spermatophytes
- Clade: Angiosperms
- Clade: Eudicots
- Clade: Asterids
- Order: Lamiales
- Family: Plantaginaceae
- Genus: Veronica
- Species: V. formosa

Binomial name
- Veronica formosa R.Br.

Synonyms
- Derwentia formosa (R.Br.) Cockayne; Hebe formosa (R.Br.) Cockayne; Parahebe formosa (R.Br.) Heads

= Veronica formosa =

Species of flowering plant

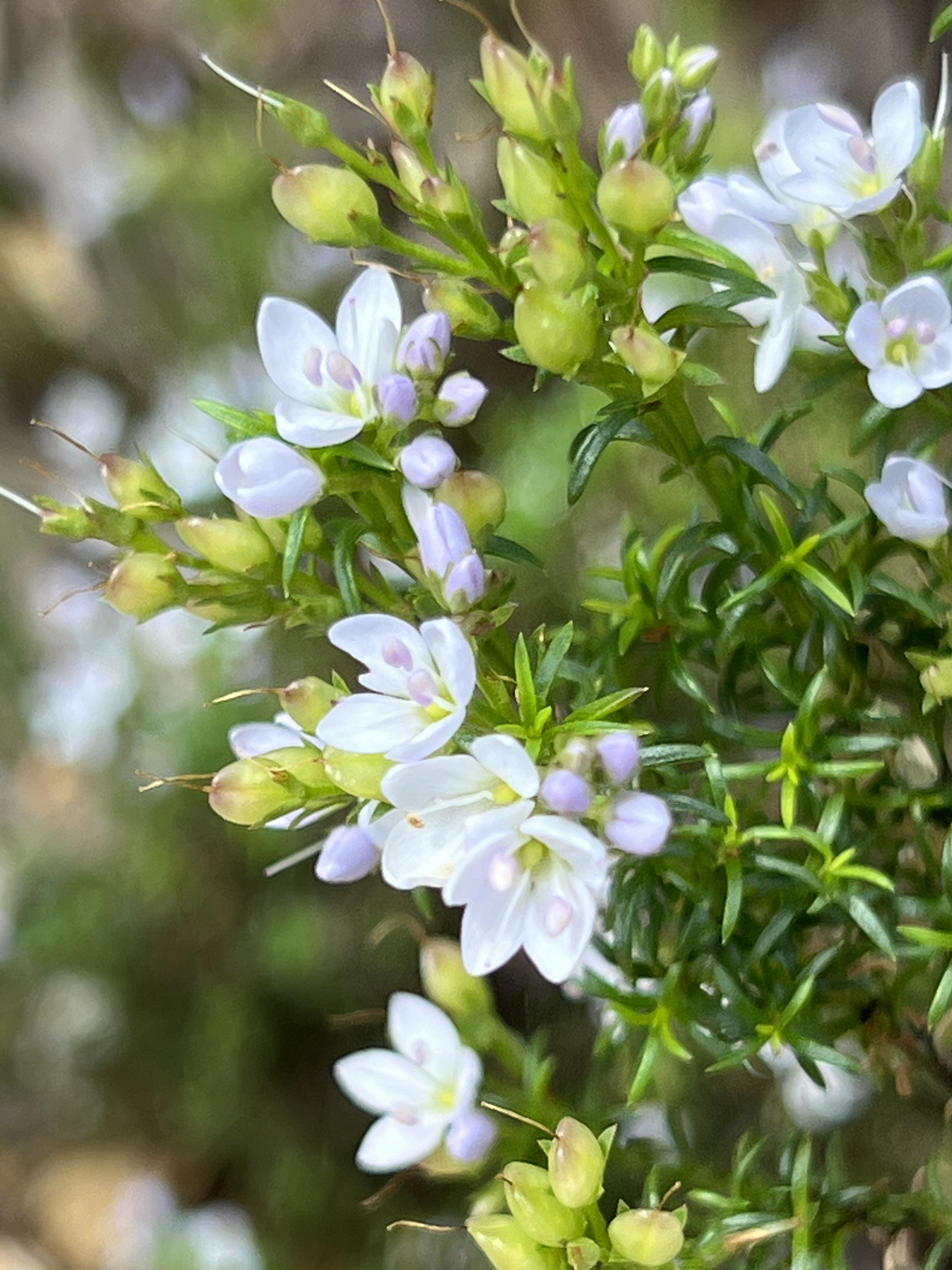
White form

Veronica formosa is a flowering plant species of the family Plantaginaceae, endemic to Tasmania in Australia. It is a subshrub which grows to between 0.5 and 2 metres (1.6 and 6.6 ft) high. The elliptic to lanceolate leaves are 7 to 15 mm long. The flowers are pale lilac or violet blue and appear in racemes from late spring to early summer.

== Cultivation ==
Plants may be grown in shade, but a position in full sun is desirable to maximise flowering. They are frost tolerant, being hardy to −7 °C (19 °F). A compact shape can be maintained by cutting back old stems after flowering.
