= Dryope melanderi =

Scientific classification
- Kingdom: Animalia
- Phylum: Arthropoda
- Clade: Pancrustacea
- Class: Insecta
- Order: Diptera
- Family: Dryomyzidae
- Genus: Dryope
- Species: D. melanderi

Binomial name
- Dryope melanderi (Steyskal, 1957)

Synonyms
- Dryomyza maculipennis Melander, 1920; Dryomyza melanderi Steyskal, 1957

Species of fly

Dryope melanderi is a fly from the family Dryomyzidae. It has recently been placed in the genus Dryope, having been more widely known as Dryomyza melanderi. It is named after American entomologist Axel Melander.

== Distribution ==
This is a western Nearctic fly, occurring in Canada (British Columbia, Quebec) and the United States (Alaska, Idaho).
