= Oedoparena glauca =

Scientific classification
- Kingdom: Animalia
- Phylum: Arthropoda
- Clade: Pancrustacea
- Class: Insecta
- Order: Diptera
- Family: Dryomyzidae
- Genus: Oedoparena
- Species: O. glauca

Binomial name
- Oedoparena glauca (Coquillett, 1900)

Species of fly

Oedoparena glauca is a common coastal fly from the family Dryomyzidae. It is the only known dipterous predator of barnacles.

== Distribution ==
This is a Nearctic fly occurring from Central California to Alaska.

== Ecology ==
Eggs are deposited on the operculum of barnacle and fly larvae consume several barnacles during their development. Pupariation then takes place in an empty barnacle shell. The adult flies emerge during the morning low tide. It is possible that other members of the genus Oedoparena may have a similar lifestyle.
