= List of Australian Scatopsidae =

This is a list of Scatopsidae taxa that occur in the Australian region.

== Abbreviations ==
- Australia
  - ACT = Australian Capital Territory
  - NSW = New South Wales
  - Qld = Queensland
  - SA = South Australia
  - TAS = Tasmania
  - Vic = Victoria
  - WA = Western Australia
- NZ = New Zealand
- PNG = Papua New Guinea

== Psectrosciarinae ==
=== Anapausis ===
- Anapausis Enderlein, 1912

- A. apiocybe Cook, 1977 (NSW)
- A. conspicua Cook, 1971 (NSW)
- A. irritata Cook, 1971 (NSW)
- A. stapedifortmis Freeman, 1989 (NZ)
- A. zealandica Freeman, 1989 (NZ)

=== Psectrosciara ===
- Psectrosciara Kieffer, 1911

- P. brevicornis Johannsen, 1946 (Guam)
- P. dapsila Cook, 1971 (WA)
- P. elachys Cook, 1971 (Qld)
- P. minor Cook, 1971 (Vic)
- P. nitida Cook, 1971 (NSW)
- P. novoguiniensis Duda, 1928 (PNG)
- P. rava Cook, 1971 (Qld)

== Scatopsinae ==
=== Diamphidicus ===
- Diamphidicus Cook, 1971

- D. australis Cook, 1971 (ACT)

=== Rhegmoclema ===
- Rhegmoclema Enderlein, 1912

- R. angustipenne Cook, 1971 (NSW)
- R. bifurcatum Cook, 1971 (NSW)
- R. cerinum Cook, 1971 (WA)
- R. collessi Cook, 1971 (Qld)
- R. hardyi Cook, 1968 (PNG - Bismarck Arch)
- R. hirtipenne Cook, 1971 (NSW)
- R. macrokylum Cook, 1971 (Qld)
- R. madarum Cook, 1971 (Qld)
- R. noscum Cook, 1971 (NSW)
- R. pallidum Cook, 1971 (Qld)
- R. parcum Cook, 1971 (Qld)
- R. pleonasmon Cook, 1971 (Qld)
- R. rarum Cook, 1971 (Qld)
- R. spatulatum Cook, 1971 (Qld, NSW)

=== Rhegmoclemina ===
- Rhegmoclemina Enderlein, 1936

- R. batilliformia Cook, 1971 (NSW, SA)
- R. eximia Cook, 1971 (Vic)
- R. teretis Cook, 1971 (ACT, NSW)

=== Parmaferia ===
- Parmaferia Cook, 1977

- P. dentata Cook, 1977 (PNG)
- P. pectinata Cook, 1977 (PNG)

=== Scatopse ===
- Scatopse Geoffroy, 1762

- S. notata (Linnaeus, 1758) ("Europa", widespread in Australia, subantarctic islands, Nearctic, Neotropics, Palearctic regions)
- S.longipennis Skuse, 1889 (NSW)

=== Reichertella ===
- Reichertella Enderlein, 1912

- R. forcipata Cook, 1971 (ACT, NSW, Vic)

=== Colobostema ===
- Colobostema Enderlein, 1926

- C. abbreviatum Cook, 1971 (Qld)
- C. albipharsum Cook, 1971 (Qld)
- C. bihastatum Cook, 1971 (ACT, NSW)
- C. caudiculum Cook, 1971 (NSW)
- C. commoni Cook, 1971 (NSW)
- C. cyclum Cook, 1971 (Qld)
- C. dilemmum Cook, 1971 (NSW)
- C. diversum Cook, 1971 (ACT, WA)

- C. diversum diversum Australia (ACT))
- C. diversum wallacei Cook, 1971 (WA))

- C. fumipenne Enderlein, 1926 (PNG)
- C. hirsutum Cook, 1971 (Qld)
- C. metarhamphe Cook, 1971 (NSW, Qld))
- C. nocturnale Cook, 1968 (PNG - Bismarck Arch)
- C. occabipes Cook, 1971 (NSW, Qld)
- C. occidentale Cook, 1971 (WA, ACT)

- C. occidentale occidentale (WA)
- C. occidentale tonnoiri Cook, 1971 (ACT)

- C. paracyclum Cook, 1971 (Vic)
- C. retusum Cook, 1971 (ACT)
- C. rhamphe Cook, 1971 (ACT, NSW, Qld, Vic)
- C. tribulosum Cook, 1971 (Qld)
- C. truncatum Cook, 1971 (Qld, (NSW)

=== Ferneiella ===
- Ferneiella Cook, 1974

- F. angusta Cook, 1977 (NSW)

=== Holoplagia ===
- Holoplagia Enderlein, 1912

- H. guamensis Johannsen, 1946 (Guam, Hawaiian Islands, Marshall Islands, Micronesia)
- H.parallelinervis Duda, 1928 (PNG)

=== Hawomersleya ===
- Hawomersleya Cook, 1971

- H. aptera Womersley, 1942 (SA, ACT)

=== Swamerdamella ===
- Swammerdamella Enderlein, 1912

- S. albimana Edwards, 1924 (Fiji, Niue)
- S. araia Cook, 1971 (Qld)
- S. arthmia Cook, 1971 (Tas, ACT)
- S. crenata Cook, 1971 (NSW, ACT)
- S. richmondensis Skuse, 1890 (NSW, Qld)
- S. sessionis Cook, 1971 NSW, ACT)
- S. stenotis Cook, 1971 (NSW, ACT)
- S. therisa Cook, 1971 (Vic, ACT, NSW, SA, Tas)

=== Coboldia ===
- Coboldia Melander, 1916

- C. fuscipes Meigen, 1830 ( (ACT, NSW, Qld, SA, Vic, WA, Hawaiian Islands, Norfolk Island, cosmopolitan) (also erroneously as Colboldia)

=== Rhexoza ===
- Rhexoza Enderlein, 1936

- R. chelata Cook, 1971 (NSW)
- R. senticosa Cook, 1971 (Qld)
