= Christii fly =

Scientific classification
- Kingdom: Animalia
- Phylum: Arthropoda
- Class: Insecta
- Order: Diptera
- Family: Scatopsidae
- Genus: Ectaetia
- Species: E. christii

Binomial name
- Ectaetia christii Rotheray & Horsfield, 1997

Species of fly

The Christii fly (Ectaetia christii) is a species of fly named after the late Iain Christie, a farmer and amateur entomologist from Dunbartonshire. It measures 2 mm (1/12 in) long and is black in colour. Christii flies live under the bark of smaller branches or twigs of dead aspen trees.

== Discovery ==
Iain Christie originally discovered the Christii fly with several others in the late 1980s, but the fly was not recognised as a new species until 1997, during a survey of the flora and fauna of the Cairngorms. The research was conducted for the book The Nature Of The Cairngorms, which includes 223 species mainly found there and 1,153 further species for which the Cairngorms are nationally noted. Graham Rotheray of the Museum of Scotland and Dave Horsfield of Scottish Natural Heritage found the Christii fly under the bark of a decaying aspen tree near Grantown-on-Spey. Since then, it has been found in Norway and two or three more times in the Cairngorms.

Rotheray described the Christii fly as "a superb example of a boreal species which has lain undiscovered in Scotland for thousands of years" and "a specialist species which adapted and probably came north with the retreat of the ice". He also believed the fly to be a relict from the ice age.
