= Colobostema varicorne =

Scientific classification
- Domain: Eukaryota
- Kingdom: Animalia
- Phylum: Arthropoda
- Class: Insecta
- Order: Diptera
- Family: Scatopsidae
- Genus: Colobostema
- Species: C. varicorne

Binomial name
- Colobostema varicorne (Coquillett, 1902)

Synonyms
- Scatopse tibialis Mcatee, 1921; Scatopse varicorne Coquillett, 1902

Species of fly

Colobostema varicorne is a species of "minute black scavenger fly" or "dung midge" in the family Scatopsidae.
