= Ectaetia =

Scientific classification
- Kingdom: Animalia
- Phylum: Arthropoda
- Class: Insecta
- Order: Diptera
- Family: Scatopsidae
- Subfamily: Ectaetiinae
- Genus: Ectaetia

Species
- Ectaetia betzi; Ectaetia christii; Ectaetia clavipes; Ectaetia cornuta; Ectaetia gracilis; Ectaetia lasiopa; Ectaetia nigronitida; Ectaetia paradoxa; Ectaetia stackelbergi; Ectaetia subclavipes; Ectaetia sublignicola

Genus of flies

Ectaetia is a small genus of minute black scavenger flies (the family Scatopsidae). Known species are found in the Nearctic, Palearctic, Oriental, and Neotropical biogeographic realms. Adults of Ectaetia species are generally shiny and black, up to 7 mm long.
