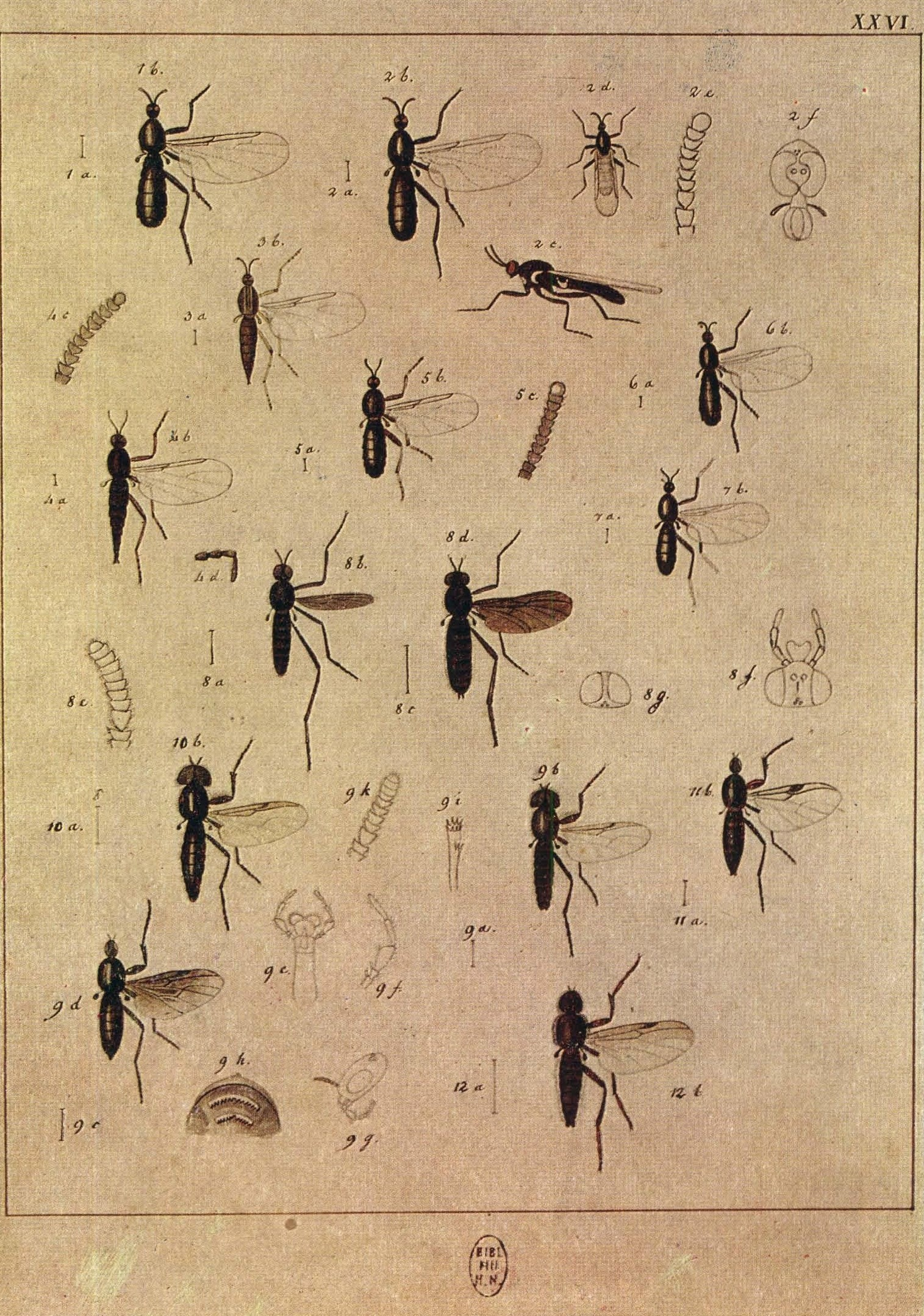
- Scatopse notata in Meigen Abbildung der europäischen zweiflügeligen Insekten nach der Natur

Scientific classification
- Kingdom: Animalia
- Phylum: Arthropoda
- Class: Insecta
- Order: Diptera
- Family: Scatopsidae
- Genus: Scatopse
- Species: S. notata

Binomial name
- Scatopse notata (Linnaeus, 1758)

Synonyms
- Tipula notata Linnaeus, 1758; Musca nectarea Linnaeus, 1767

= Scatopse notata =

Species of fly

Scatopse notata is a species of fly in the family Scatopsidae. It is found in the Palearctic.
