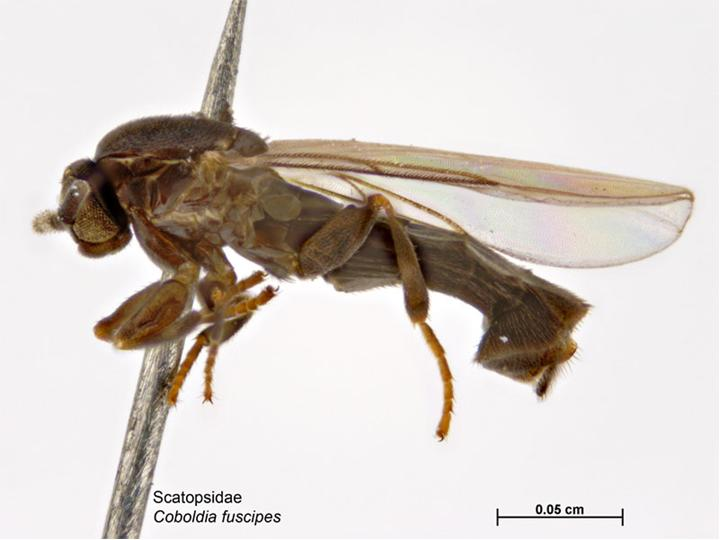

Scientific classification
- Kingdom: Animalia
- Phylum: Arthropoda
- Class: Insecta
- Order: Diptera
- Family: Scatopsidae
- Genus: Coboldia
- Species: C. fuscipes

Binomial name
- Coboldia fuscipes (Meigen, 1830)

= Coboldia fuscipes =

Species of fly

Coboldia fuscipes is a species of fly in the family Scatopsidae. It is found in the Palearctic.
