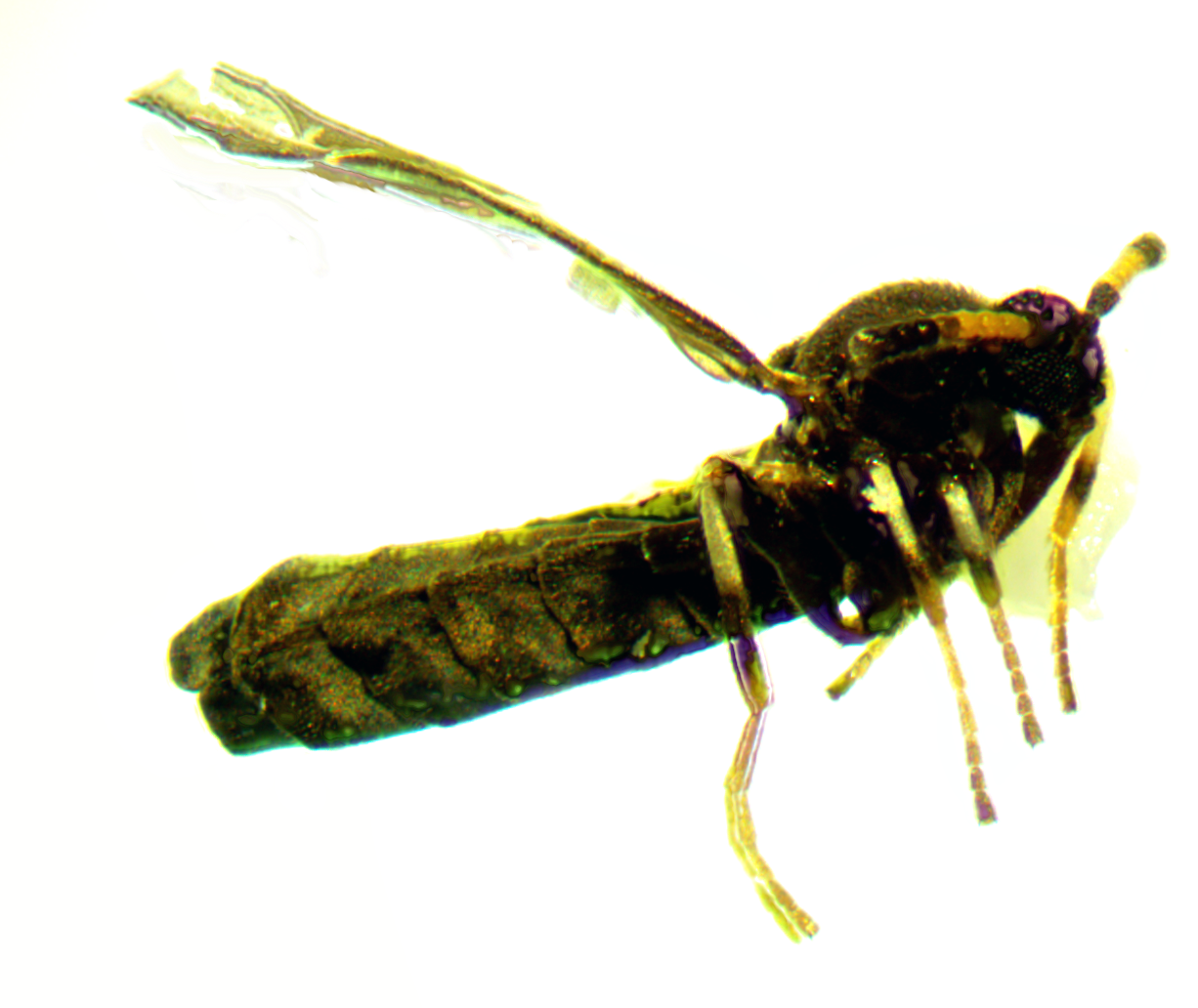
- Colobostema

Scientific classification
- Kingdom: Animalia
- Phylum: Arthropoda
- Clade: Pancrustacea
- Class: Insecta
- Order: Diptera
- Family: Scatopsidae
- Subfamily: Scatopsinae
- Genus: Colobostema; Enderlein, 1926

= Colobostema =

Genus of flies

Colobostema is a genus of minute black scavenger flies in the family Scatopsidae. There are at least 4 described species in Colobostema.

== Species ==
- Colobostema arizonense Cook, 1956
- Colobostema leechi Cook, 1978
- Colobostema variatum Cook, 1956
- Colobostema varicorne (Coquillett, 1902)
