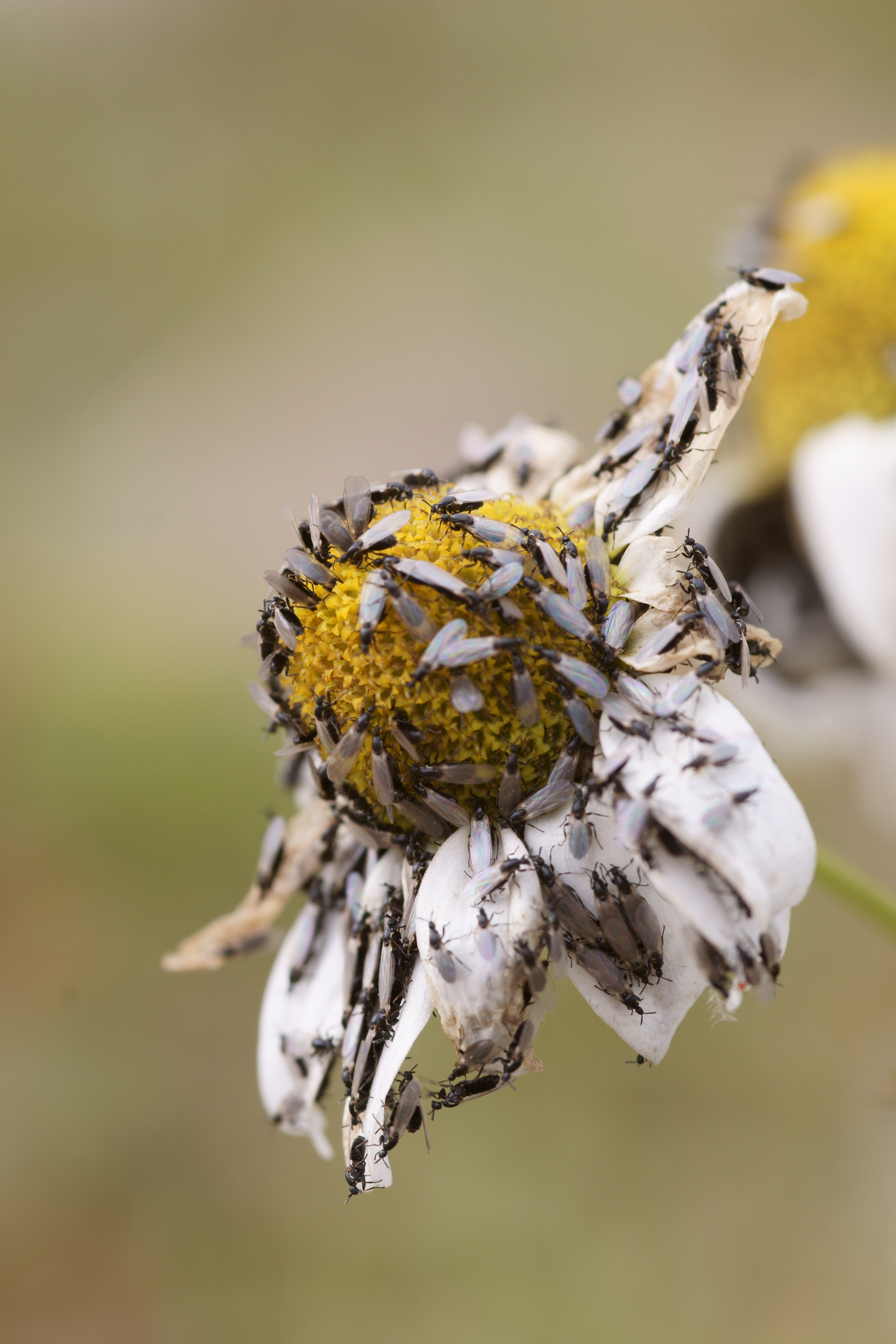
- Minute black scavenger flies on oxeye daisy.

Scientific classification
- Kingdom: Animalia
- Phylum: Arthropoda
- Clade: Pancrustacea
- Class: Insecta
- Order: Diptera
- Suborder: Nematocera
- Infraorder: Bibionomorpha
- Superfamily: Scatopsoidea
- Family: Scatopsidae; Newman, 1834

Subfamilies
- Aspistinae; Ectaetiinae; Psectrosciarinae; Scatopsinae

= Scatopsidae =

Family of flies

Scatopsidae on Impatiens

The minute black scavenger flies or "dung midges", are a family, Scatopsidae, of nematoceran flies. Despite being distributed throughout the world, they form a small family with only around 250 described species in 27 genera, although many await description and doubtless even more await discovery. These are generally small, sometimes minute, dark flies (from 0.6 to 5 mm), generally similar to black flies (Simuliidae), but usually lacking the humped thorax characteristic of that family.

The larvae of most species are unknown, but the few that have been studied have a rather flattened shape and are terrestrial and saprophagous.

Scatopsids are a well established group and fossils are known from amber deposits dating back to the Cretaceous period.

Scatopse notata (Linnaeus, 1758) is a cosmopolitan species. Its larval stages are found in decaying plant and animal material.

== Genera ==
- Anapausis Enderlein, 1912
- Apiloscatopse Cook, 1874
- Arthria Kirby, 1837
- Aspistes Meigen, 1818
- Austroclemina
- Borneoscatopse
- Brahemyia Amorim, 2007
- Coboldia Melander, 1916 (sometimes erroneously as Colboldia)
- Colobostema Enderlein, 1926
- Cooka Amorin, 2007
- Diamphidicus Cook, 1971
- Efcookella
- Ectaetia Enderlein, 1912
- Ferneiella Cook, 1974
- Hawomersleya Cook, 1971
- Holoplagia Enderlein, 1912
- † Mesoscatopse
- Neorhegmoclemina
- Parascatopse Cook, 1955
- Parmaferia Cook, 1977
- † Procolobostema
- † Protoscatopse
- Psectrosciara Kieffer, 1911
- Quateiella Cook, 1975
- Reichertella Enderlein, 1912
- Rhegmoclema Enderlein, 1912
- Rhegmoclemina Enderlein, 1936
- Rhexoza Enderlein, 1936
- Scatopse Geoffroy, 1762 (sometimes erroneously as Scatops or Scathops)
- Swammerdamella Enderlein, 1912
- Thripomorpha Enderlein, 1905

== Description ==
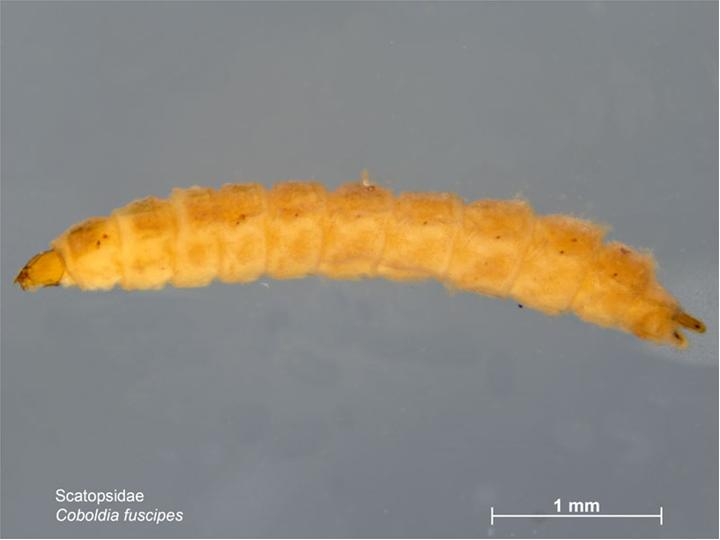
Larva of Coboldia fuscipes

Adult Scatopsidae are 0.6-5.0 mm long. They can be distinguished from other fly families by their wings and relatively short antennae. The wing has strong veins along the anterior margin while the remaining veins are generally weak, and the fork of vein Cu is at the wing base.

The larvae are dorsoventrally flattened with an exerted head capsule, meaning it cannot be retracted. They have a peripneustic respiratory system. Some taxa have spiracles on protuberances.

== Life cycle ==
Eggs of Scatopsidae are laid on moist substrates in crescent-shaped masses of about 50-300 eggs. Females shortly after laying. The eggs take about 35 days to hatch, though it depends on temperature.

The life cycle take 3–4 weeks to complete in the common species Coboldia fuscipes and S. notata. The adult stage is generally quite short, usually 2-3 or 4–5 days.

== Ecology ==
Adult Scatopsidae live in various habitats, though they are more frequent and diverse in open, fresh and marshy habitats. Some species are known to feed on flowers, especially Apiaceae.

Larvae live in various kinds of decomposing organic matter. Plant matter is preferred by Scatopsini and Swammerdamellini, with Ectaetia living in rotten wood, Arthria and Rhexoza under bark of decaying trees, and Ectaetia and Holoplagia in tree holes. Various genera are terricolous (living in soil), with Aspistes in sandy soils, Parascatopse in saltings, some Psectrosciarinae and Rhegmoclematini in wet/marshy soils, and Apiloscatopse in forest leaf litter. Fungi are used by Coboldia fuscipes as well as species of Scatopse and Apiloscatopse. Various genera including Scatopse, Coboldia, Cookella and Anapausis live in dung. Animal matter such as carrion is used by Scatopse and Coboldia. A few species of Colobostema and Holoplagia are myrmecophilous (associated with ants), and presumably feed on debris in ant nests. There are even some Scatopsinae which are aquatic, living in forest springs and presumably feeding on waterlogged dead leaves.

Larvae of C. fuscipes and S. notata have also been reported from the waste of canneries and wineries.

== Behaviour ==
Scatopsidae may form swarms of up to thousands of individuals, sometimes including several species at once, possibly for reproduction. Scatopsidae mate in a tail-tail position and mating can last for a long time. One species, Thripomorpha halterata, has been observed doing rhythmic wing movements while swarming, which may be a courtship behaviour.

== Name ==
The family name Scatopsidae literally translates to "looks like feces" (from Greek skat "dung" and opsi "appearance"). It is derived from the genus Scatopse, which has been frequently misspelled as Scatops.

== See also ==
- List of Australian Scatopsidae
