= List of Diptera families =

This is a list of the families of the order Diptera (true flies). The classification is based largely on Pape et al. (2011). Many of the fossil species are of uncertain placement and are retained in separate lists broadly under Nematocera and Brachycera.

Graphical overview

- Diptera
  - Nematocera
    - Deuterophlebiomorpha
    - Nymphomyiomorpha
    - Tipulomorpha
    - Ptychopteromorpha
    - Psychodomorpha
    - Culicomorpha
    - Neodiptera
      - Perissommatomorpha
      - Bibionomorpha
  - Brachycera
    - Orthorrhapha
    - Eremoneura
      - Cyclorrhapha
        - Aschiza
        - Schizophora
          - Acalyptratae
          - Calyptratae

== Nematocera ==
=== Infraorder Deuterophlebiomorpha ===
- Deuterophlebiidae Edwards, 1922

=== Infraorder Nymphomyiomorpha ===
- Nymphomyiidae Tokunaga, 1932

=== Infraorder Tipulomorpha ===
- Tipulidae Latreille, 1802
- Cylindrotomidae Schiner, 1863
- Trichoceridae Rondani, 1841 Synonym: Petauristidae.
- Pediciidae Osten-Sacken, 1859
- Limoniidae Rondani, 1856

=== Infraorder Ptychopteromorpha ===
- Ptychopteridae Osten-Sacken, 1862 Synonyms: Liriopeidae, Liriopidae.

=== Infraorder Psychodomorpha ===
- Blephariceridae Loew, 1861 Synonym: Blepharoceridae.
- Psychodidae Newman, 1834 Synonyms: Nemopalpidae, Phlebotomidae, Trichomyiidae.
- Tanyderidae Osten-Sacken, 1880 Synonym: Macrochilidae.

=== Infraorder Culicomorpha ===
- Dixidae Schiner, 1868
- Corethrellidae Edwards, 1932
- Chaoboridae Newman, 1834 Synonyms: Corethridae, Chironomapteridae, Mesotendipedidae, Dixamimidae, Rhaetomyiidae.
- Culicidae Meigen, 1818
- Thaumaleidae Bezzi, 1913 Synonym: Orphnephilidae.
- Simuliidae Newman, 1834 Synonyms: Melusinidae.
- Ceratopogonidae Newman, 1834 Synonyms: Leptoconopidae, Helidae, Heleidae.
- Chironomidae Newman, 1834 Synonym: Tendipedidae

=== Infraorder Perissommatomorpha ===
- Perissommatidae Colless, 1962

=== Infraorder Bibionomorpha ===
- Anisopodidae Knab, 1912 Synonyms: Phryneidae, Rhyphidae, Sylvicolidae, Mycetobiidae, Protolbiogastridae.
- Canthyloscelididae Enderlein, 1912 Synonyms: Hyperoscelididae, Synneuridae.
- Scatopsidae Newman, 1834
- Axymyiidae Shannon, 1921
- Hesperinidae Schiner, 1864
- Bibionidae Fleming, 1821 Synonyms: Penthetriidae, Pleciidae.
- Pachyneuridae Schiner, 1864 Synonym: Cramptonomyiidae.
- Ditomyiidae Kylin, 1919
- Diadocidiidae Winnertz, 1863
- Mycetophilidae Newman, 1834 Synonyms: Fungivoridae, Allactoneuridae, Manotidae
- Bolitophilidae Winnertz, 1863 Synonym: Bolitophilinae.
- Keroplatidae Rondani, 1856 Synonyms: Ceroplatidae, Zelmiridae, Platyuridae, Zelmicidae, Macroceratidae, Macroceridae, Necromyzidae
- Lygistorrhinidae Edwards, 1925
- Rangomaramidae Jaschhof & Didham, 2002
- Sciaridae Billberg, 1820 Synonym: Lycoriidae.
- Cecidomyiidae Newman, 1835 Synonyms: Porricondylidae, Itonididae, Heteropezidae, Lestremiidae, Campylomyzidae.

== Nematocera families known only as fossils ==
- Ansorgiidae Krzemiński & Lukashevich, 1993.
- Antefungivoridae Rohdendorf, 1938. Synonyms: Antiquamediidae, Pleciomimidae, Sinemediidae.
- Architendipedidae
- Archizelmiridae Rohdendorf, 1962.
- Asiochaoboridae Hong & Wang, 1990.
- Boholdoyidae Kovalev, 1985.
- Cascopleciidae
- Crosaphididae Kovalev, 1983.
- Elliidae Krzemińska, Blagoderov & Krezmiński, 1993.
- Eoditomyiidae Ansorge, 1996.
- Eopleciidae.
- Eopolyneuridae Rohdendorf, 1962.
- Eoptychopteridae.
- Gracilitipulidae.
- Grauvogeliidae Krzemiński, 1999.
- Hennigmatidae Shcherbakov, 1995.
- Heterorhyphidae Ansorge & Krzemiński, 1995.
- Hyperpolyneuridae. Rohdendorf, 1962
- Limnorhyphidae.
- Luanpingitidae Zhang, 1986.
- Mesophantasmatidae.
- Mesosciophilidae Rohdendorf, 1946.
- Musidoromimidae.
- Nadipteridae Lukashevich, 1995.
- Oligophrynidae.
- Oreodomyiidae.
- Palaeophoridae Rohdendorf, 1951. Synonym: Sciadoceridae
- Parapleciidae.
- Paraxymyiidae Rohdendorf, 1946.
- Pleciodictyidae.
- Pleciofungivoridae Rohdendorf, 1946. Synonym: Fungivoritinae
- Procramptonomyiidae Kovalev, 1983.
- Protendipedidae Rohdendorf, 1951. Synonym: Prototendipedidae.
- Protobibionidae F. M. Carpenter 1992.
- Protopleciidae Rohdendorf, 1946. Synonyms: Dyspolyneuridae, Protoligoneuridae. Palaeoplecidae
- Protorhyphidae Handlirsch, 1906.
- Protoscatopsidae Rohdendorf, 1946.
- Serendipidae Evenhuis, 1994. Synonym: Paratendipedidae.
- Siberhyphidae Kovalev, 1985.
- Sinotendipedidae.
- Strashilidae. Synonym: Vosilidae.
- Tanyderophrynidae Rohdendorf, 1962. Synonym: Tanyderophryneidae.
- Tethepomyiidae Grimaldi & Arillo, 2009
- Tillyardipteridae Lukashevich & Shcherbakov, 1999.
- Tipulodictyidae Rohdendorf, 1962.
- Tipulopleciidae Rohdendorf, 1962.
- Valeseguyidae Amorim & Grimaldi, 2006.
- Vladipteridae Shcherbakov, 1995.
- Zhangobiidae. Synonyms: Palaeolimnobiidae.

== Brachycera ==
=== Orthorrhapha ===
- Nemestrinidae Griffith & Pidgeon, 1832
- Acroceridae Leach, 1815 Synonyms: Cyrtidae, Oncodidae, Ogcodidae.
- Hilarimorphidae Williston, 1896
- Vermileonidae Williston, 1886 Synonyms: Protobrachyceridae, Protobrachycerontidae.

Superfamily Asiloidea Latreille, 1802

- Bombyliidae Latreille, 1802 Synonyms: Phthiriidae, Systropodidae, Usiidae.
- Asilidae Latreille, 1802 Synonym: Leptogastridae.
- Mydidae Latreille, 1809 Synonyms: Mydaidae, Mydasidae
- Apioceridae Bigot, 1857
- Evocoidae Yeates, Irwin & Wiegmann 2006
- Apsilocephalidae Nagatomi, Saigusa, Nagatomi & Lyneborg, 1991
- Scenopinidae Burmeister, 1835 Synonym: Omphralidae.
- Therevidae Newman, 1834
- Mythicomyiidae Synonyms: Cyrtosiidae, Mythicomyiinae.

Superfamily Rhagionoidea Latreille, 1802

- Austroleptidae Nagatomi, 1982
- Bolbomyiidae Stuckenberg, 2001
- Rhagionidae Latreille, 1802 Synonyms: Leptidae, Erinnidae (sensu Evenhuis), Paleostratiomyiidae?

Superfamily Stratiomyoidea Latreille, 1802

- Pantophthalmidae Bigot, 1886 Synonym: Acanthomeridae.
- Stratiomyidae Latreille, 1804
- Xylomyidae Verrall, 1901 Synonyms: Xylomyiidae, Solvidae.

Superfamily Tabanoidea Latreille, 1802

- Athericidae Nowicki, 1873
- Oreoleptidae Zloty, Sinclair & Pritchard, 2005
- Pelecorhynchidae Enderlein, 1922
- Tabanidae Latreille, 1802

Superfamily Xylophagoidea Fallén, 1810

- Xylophagidae Fallén, 1810 Synonyms: Heterostomidae, Exeretonevridae, Exerotonevridae, Erinniidae ?(sensu Schumann), Rachiceridae, Coenomyidae, Coenomyiidae.

Superfamily Empidoidea Latreille, 1804

- Atelestidae Hennig, 1970
- Dolichopodidae Latreille, 1809 Synonym: Microphoridae
- Empididae Latreille, 1804 Synonym: Empidae.
- Homalocnemiidae Collin, 1928
- Hybotidae Macquart, 1823
- Oreogetonidae Chvála, 1976
- Ragadidae Sinclair, 2016

Superfamily Apystomyioidea Nagatomi & Liu, 1994

- Apystomyiidae Nagatomi & Liu, 1994

=== Aschiza ===
Superfamily Phoroidea Curtis, 1833

- Ironomyiidae McAlpine & Martin, 1966
- Lonchopteridae Macquart, 1823 Synonym: Musidoridae.
- Opetiidae Rondani, 1856
- Phoridae Curtis, 1833 Synonyms: Sciadoceridae, Termitoxeniidae.
- Platypezidae Latreille, 1829 Synonym: Clythiidae.

Superfamily Syrphoidea Latreille, 1802

- Pipunculidae Walker, 1834 Synonyms: Dorylaidae, Dorilaidae.
- Syrphidae Latreille, 1802

=== Schizophora ===
- Conopidae Latreille, 1802 Synonym: Stylogastridae.

==== Acalyptratae ====
Superfamily Carnoidea Newman, 1834

- Australimyzidae Griffiths, 1972
- Braulidae Egger, 1853
- Canacidae Jones, 1906 Synonyms: Canaceidae, Tethinidae.
- Carnidae Newman, 1834
- Chloropidae Rondani, 1856 Synonyms: Siphonellopsidae, Oscinidae.
- Inbiomyiidae Buck, 2006
- Milichiidae Schiner, 1862 Synonym: Phyllomyzidae.

Superfamily Ephydroidea Zetterstedt, 1837

- Camillidae Frey, 1921
- Curtonotidae Enderlein, 1914 Synonym: Cyrtonotidae
- Diastatidae Hendel, 1917 (including Campichoetidae)
- Drosophilidae Rondani, 1856
- Ephydridae Zetterstedt, 1837 Synonyms: Risidae, Risiidae.
- Mormotomyiidae Austen, 1936

Superfamily Lauxanioidea Macquart, 1835

- Celyphidae Bigot, 1852
- Chamaemyiidae Hendel, 1910 Synonyms: Ochthiphilidae, Ochthiphilidae.
- Cremifaniidae McAlpine, 1963
- Lauxaniidae Macquart, 1835 Synonym: Sapromyzidae.

Superfamily Lonchaeoidea

- Cryptochetidae Brues & Melander, 1932
- Lonchaeidae Rondani, 1856

Superfamily Nerioidea Westwood, 1840

- Cypselosomatidae Hendel, 1931 Synonyms: Pseudopomyzidae Frey, 1941
- Micropezidae Blanchard, 1840 Synonyms: Calobatidae, Taeniapteridae, Tylidae, Trepidariidae.
- Neriidae Westwood, 1840

Superfamily Opomyzoidea Fallén, 1820

- Acartophthalmidae Czerny, 1928
- Agromyzidae Fallén, 1823 Synonym: Phytomyzidae
- Anthomyzidae Czerny, 1903
- Asteiidae Rondani, 1856 Synonym: Astiidae.
- Aulacigastridae Duda, 1924 Synonyms: Aulacigastreridae.
- Clusiidae Handlirsch, 1884 Synonyms: Clusiodidae, Heteroneuridae.
- Fergusoninidae Tonnoir, 1937
- Marginidae McAlpine, 1991
- Megamerinidae Hendel, 1913 Synonym: Megameridae.
- Neminidae McAlpine, 1983
- Neurochaetidae McAlpine, 1978
- Odiniidae Hendel, 1920
- Opomyzidae Fallén, 1820 Synonym: Geomyzidae (sensu Evenhuis, 1994)
- Periscelididae Oldenberg, 1914 Synonyms: Periscelidae, Stenomicridae.
- Teratomyzidae Hennig, 1969
- Xenasteiidae Hardy, 1980

Superfamily Sciomyzoidea Fallén, 1820

- Coelopidae Hendel, 1910 Synonyms: Phycodromiidae, Pycodromidae.
- Dryomyzidae Schiner, 1862
- Helcomyzidae Hendel, 1924
- Huttoninidae Steyskal, 1965
- Helosciomyzidae Steyskal, 1965
- Heterocheilidae McAlpine, 1991
- Natalimyzidae Barraclough & McAlpine, 2006
- Phaeomyiidae Verbeke, 1950
- Ropalomeridae Schiner, 1868
- Sciomyzidae Fallén, 1820 Synonyms: Tetanoceridae.
- Sepsidae Walker, 1833 Synonym: Sepsididae.

Superfamily Sphaeroceroidea Macquart, 1835

- Chyromyidae Schiner, 1863 Synonyms: Chiromyiidae, Geomyzidae (part. sensu Schumann, 1965)
- Heleomyzidae Westwood, 1840 Synonyms: Helomyzidae, Trixoscelididae, Trichoscelidae, Rhinotoridae, Chiropteraomyzidae.
- Heteromyzidae Fallén, 1820
- Nannodastiidae Papp, 1980
- Sphaeroceridae Macquart, 1835 Synonyms: Borboridae, Cypselidae.

Superfamily Tanypezoidea Rondani, 1856 (7 families)

- Diopsidae Billberg, 1820 Synonyms: Centrioncidae.
- Gobryidae McAlpine, 1997
- Nothybidae Frey, 1927
- Psilidae Macquart, 1835
- Somatiidae Hendel, 1935
- Strongylophthalmyiidae Hendel, 1917
- Syringogastridae Prado, 1969
- Tanypezidae Rondani, 1856

Superfamily Tephritoidea Newman, 1834

- Ctenostylidae Bigot, 1882
- Pallopteridae Loew, 1862 Synonym: Eurygnathomyiidae.
- Piophilidae Macquart, 1835 Synonyms: Neottiophilidae, Thyreophoridae
- Platystomatidae Schiner, 1862 Synonym: Platystomidae.
- Pyrgotidae Loew, 1868
- Richardiidae Loew, 1868
- Tephritidae Newman, 1834 Synonyms: Trypetidae, Trupaneidae, Trypaneidae, Tachiniscidae.
- Ulidiidae Macquart, 1835 Synonyms: Otitidae, Ortalidae, Pterocallidae.

==== Calyptratae ====
Superfamily Hippoboscoidea Samouelle, 1819

- Glossinidae Theobald, 1903
- Hippoboscidae Samouelle, 1819
- Nycteribiidae Samouelle (ex Leach), 1819
- Streblidae Kolenati, 1863

Superfamily Muscoidea Latreille, 1802

- Anthomyiidae Robineau-Desvoidy, 1830
- Fanniidae Schnabl & Dziedzicki, 1911
- Muscidae Latreille, 1802 Synonyms: Eginiidae
- Scathophagidae Robineau-Desvoidy, 1830 Synonyms: Cordyluridae, Scatomyzidae, Scopeumatidae, Cordiluridae.

Superfamily Oestroidea Leach, 1815

- Calliphoridae Brauer & Bergenstamm, 1889 Synonyms: Mesembrinellidae, Bengaliidae.
- Mystacinobiidae Holloway, 1976
- Oestridae Leach, 1815 Synonyms: Cuterebridae, Gasterophilidae, Gastrophilidae, Hypodermatidae.
- Rhiniidae Brauer & Bergenstamm, 1889
- Rhinophoridae Robineau-Desvoidy, 1863 Synonym: Melanophoridae.
- Sarcophagidae Macquart, 1834
- Tachinidae Robineau-Desvoidy, 1830 Synonyms: Larvaevoridae, Stackelbergomyiidae.
- Ulurumyiidae Michelsen & Pape, 2017

== Brachycera families known only as fossils ==
- Alinkidae Krzemiński, 1992
- Archisargidae Rohdendorf, 1951
- Chimeromyiidae Grimaldi, Cumming & Arillo, 2009
- Cratomyiidae Mazzarolo & Amorim, 2000
- Eomyiidae Rohdendorf, 1962
- Eostratiomyiidae Rohdendorf, 1951
- Eophlebomyiidae Cockerell, 1925
- Eremochaetidae Ussatchov, 1968
- Galliidae Lukashevich & Mostovski, 2023
- Hoffeinsmyiidae Michelsen, 2009
- Kovalevisargidae Mostovski, 1997
- Orientisargidae Zhang 2012
- Palaeostratiomyiidae Rohdendorf, 1938
- Proneottiphilidae Hennig, 1969
- Prosechamyiidae Blagoderov & Grimaldi, 2007
- Protapioceridae Ren, 1998
- Protobrachyceridae Rohdendorf, 1964
- Protempididae Ussatchov, 1968.
- Protomphralidae Rohdendorf, 1957
- Rhagionemestriidae Ussatchov, 1968
- Rhagionempididae Rohdendorf, 1951
- Uranorhagionidae Zhang, Yang & Ren, 2010
- Zhangsolvidae Nagatomi & Yang, 1998

== See also ==
- List of obsolete names in Diptera

== Sources ==
- Barraclough, D. A. & McAlpine, D. K. 2006. Natalimyzidae, a new African family of acalyptrate flies (Diptera: Schizophora: Sciomyzoidea). African Invertebrates 47: 117-134.
- Evenhuis, N.L. (1994): Catalogue of the Fossil Flies of the world (Insecta: Diptera). - Leiden: Backhuys Publ.: 600 pp.
- Evenhuis, N.L. (1996): Catalogue of the Diptera of the Australasien and Oceanian Regions. -
- Evenhuis, N.L. (1996): Catalogue of the fossil flies of the world. -
- Jacobs, W. & Renner, M (1988): Biologie und Ökologie der Insekten, 2.Aufl.. - Stuttgart: Fischer: 690 pp.
- Maddison, D.R. Tree of life: phylogeny and systematics of Diptera. -
- Schumann, H. (1992): Systematische Gliederung der Ordnung Diptera mit besonderer Berücksichtigung der in Deutschland vorkommenden Familien. - Dt. Ent. Ztsch. N.F. 39 (1-3): 103-116.
- Zhang, Z.-Q. (Ed.) 2011 Animal biodiversity: An outline of higher-level classification and survey of taxonomic richness (Zootaxa 3148). Magnolia Press, Auckland, 237 pp. online here pdf
- Zoological Record. -

== Other information ==
=== Identifying the families ===
- McAlpine, David K. (1958). "A key to the Australian families of Acalptrate Diptera (Insecta)". Records of the Australian Museum. 24 (12): 183–190. doi:10.3853/j.0067-1975.24.1958.650.
- McAlpine, J.P. (ed.). Manual of Nearctic Diptera. Vol. 1. Ottawa: Research Branch, Agriculture Canada, Monograph 27. ISBN 0660107317. Archived from the original on 2013-12-01.
- Pjotr Oosterbroek, 2006 The European families of the Diptera : identification, diagnosis, biology Utrecht, KNNV ISBN 9050112455
- Oldroyd, Harold (1954). Diptera 1. Introduction and key to families. Handbooks for the Identification of British Insects. Vol 9 Part 1. Royal Entomological Society. Archived from the original on 2014-02-09.
- Curran, Charles Howard (1934). The families and genera of North American Diptera. New York.
- Families of Diptera found in Baltic Amber
