= List of obsolete names in Diptera =

The higher-level classification of the insect order Diptera has been subject to frequent revision. Over the past several decades, numerous of names have been proposed, rejected, redefined, or altered in spelling. No consensus exists regarding the appropriate classification for order, reflecting broader challenges to the principles of biological classification. This is particularly evident among Dipteran systematists. Obsolete names continue to appear in both printed and online resource; this article aims to assist readers in identifying them.

In addition, this list also contains names of fossil taxa, which are generally difficult to place within contemporary classifications, because these rely on molecular phylogenetics and do not include fossils evidence.

== Family names in Nematocera ==
Families in the list below marked with a plus sign are extinct.

- +Ansorgiidae
- +Antefungivoridae
- Baenotidae - rank (genus) in Cecidomyiidae
- +Boholdoyidae
- Cecidomyidae - misspelling for Cecidomyiidae
- Cramptonomyiidae - rank in Pachyneuridae
- +Crosaphididae
- +Dixamimidae - extinct (Middle Jurassic) rank in Chaoboridae
- +Elliidae
- +Gracilitipulidae
- +Grauvogeliidae
- +Hennigmatidae
- Hyperoscelididae - rank in Canthyloscelidae
- Leptoconopidae - rank in Ceratopogonidae
- Lestremiidae - rank in Cecidomyiidae
- +Limnorhyphidae
- +Luanpingitidae
- Macroceridae - rank in Keroplatidae
- +Mesosciophilidae
- Mycetobiidae - rank in Anisopodidae
- +Nadipteridae
- Nemopalpidae - rank in Psychodidae
- Olbiogastridae - rank in Anisopodidae
- +Oreodomyiidae
- Orphnephilidae - rank in Thaumaleidae
- +Parapleciidae
- Penthrediidae - rank in Bibionidae
- Phlebotomidae - rank in Psychodidae
- +Phragmoligoneuridae - synonym for +Protopliciidae
- Pleciidae - rank in Bibionidae
- +Procramptonomyiidae
- +Protopliciidae
- +Rhaetomyiidae extinct (Upper Triassic) rank in Chaoboridae
- Rhyphidae - rank in Anisopodidae
- +Serendipidae
- +Siberhyphidae
- +Sinotendipedidae
- Synneuridae - rank in Canthyloscelidae
- +Zhangobiidae

== Family names in Brachycera ==
=== Non-cyclorrhaphan Brachycera ===
- Acanthomeridae - rank in Pantophthalmidae
- +Alinkidae - extinct (Triassic)
- +Archisargidae - extinct (Middle Jurassic)
- Coenomyiidae - rank in Xylophagidae
- Cyrtosiidae - rank in Mythicomyiidae
- +Eomyiidae - extinct (Middle Jurassic)
- +Eostratiomyiidae - extinct (Middle Jurassic)
- +Eremochaetidae - extinct (Cretaceous, Jurassic)
- Exeretonevridae - rank in Xylophagidae
- Glutopidae - rank in Pelecorhychidae
- Heterostomidae - rank in Xylophagidae
- Microphoridae - rank in Dolichopodidae
- Mydaidae - misspelling of Mydidae
- +Palaeostratiomyiidae - extinct (Middle Jurassic) rank in Rhagionidae
- +Protempididae - extinct (Upper Jurassic)
- +Protobrachycerontidae - extinct (Lower Jurassic) rank in Vermileonidae
- +Protocyrtidae - extinct (Middle Jurassic) rank in Heloridae, Hymenoptera - originally misidentified as Diptera
- +Protomphralidae - extinct (Middle Jurassic)
- Rachiceridae - rank in Xylophagidae
- +Rhagionempididae - extinct (Middle Jurassic)
- Solvidae - rank in Xylomyidae
- Stratiomyiidae - misspelling for Stratiomyidae
- Systropodidae - rank in Bombyliidae
- Usiidae - rank in Bombyliidae

=== Cyclorrhapha - Aschiza ===
- Aenigmatiidae - rank in Phoridae
- Microdontidae - rank in Syrphidae
- Sciadoceridae - rank in Phoridae
- Termitoxeniidae - rank in Phoridae
- Thaumatoxenidae - rank in Phoridae

=== Cyclorrhapha - Acalyptratae ===
- Borboridae - synonym for Sphaeroceridae
- Borboropsidae - rank in Heleomyzidae
- Calobatidae - rank in Micropezidae
- Campichoetidae - rank in Diastatidae
- Canaceidae - misspelling of Canacidae
- Centrioncidae - rank in Diopsidae
- Chiropteromyzidae - rank in Heleomyzidae
- Cnemospathidae - rank in Heleomyzidae
- Cremifaniidae - rank in Chamaemyiidae
- Cypselidae - synonym for Sphaeroceridae
- Diopseidae - misspelling of Diopsidae
- Eurychoromyiidae rank in Lauxaniidae
- Eurygnathomyidae - rank in Pallopteridae
- Euxestidae - rank in Ulidiidae
- Heteromyzidae - rank in Heleomyzidae
- Mindidae - synonym for Chloropidae
- Neottiophilidae - rank in Piophilidae
- Notomyzidae - rank in Heleomyzidae
- Otitidae - rank in Ulidiidae
- Phycodromidae - synonym for Coelopidae
- Proneottiophilidae - rank in Psilidae
- Pterocallidae - rank in Ulidiidae
- Rhinotoridae - rank in Heleomyzidae
- Rhopalomeridae - misspelling of Ropalomeridae
- Risidae - rank in Ephydridae
- Sapromyzidae - rank in Lauxaniidae
- Sepsididae - misspelling of Sepsidae
- Siphonellopsidae - rank in Chloropidae
- Stenomicridae - rank in Persicelididae
- Strongylophthalmidae - misspelling of Strongylophthalmyiidae
- Strongylophthalmyiidae - rank in Tanypezidae
- Stylogastridae (or Stylogasteridae) - rank in Conopidae
- Taeniapteridae - rank in Micropezidae
- Tetanoceridae - rank in Sciomyzidae
- Thyreophoridae - rank in Piophilidae
- Trixoscelididae - rank in Heleomyzidae
- Trypetidae - rank in Tephritidae
- Tunisimyiidae - rank in Xenasteiidae
- Tylidae - rank in Micropezidae

=== Cyclorrhapha - Calyptratae ===
- Acridomyiidae - rank in Anthomyiidae
- Anthomylidae (or Anthomyidae) - misspelling of Anthomyiidae
- Axiniidae - rank in Rhinophoridae
- Cordyluridae - rank in Scathophagidae
- Cuterebridae - rank in Oestridae
- Dexiidae - rank in Tachinidae
- Eginiidae - rank in Muscidae
- Gastrophilidae - rank in Oestridae
- Hypodermatidae - rank in Oestridae
- Leucostomatidae - rank in Sarcophagidae
- Mesembrinellidae - rank in Calliphoridae
- Phasiidae - rank in Tachinidae
- Scatophagidae - misspelling of Scathophagidae; Scatophagidae is a family of fish
- Stackelbergomyiidae - rank in Tachinidae
- Villeneuviellidae - rank in Calliphoridae

== Higher level invalid names ==
- Anthomyiidea - superfamily, now in Muscoidea
- Asilidea - rank in Asiloidea
- Bibionidea - rank in infraorder Culicomorpha
- Bolitophilidea - invalid superfamily in Bibionomorpha
- Bombyliidea - rank in Asiloidea
- Borboridea - rank in family Stratiomyomorpha
- Braulomorpha - infraorder, now in superfamily Carnoidea
- Chironomidea - rank in infraorder Culicomorpha
- Chloropidea - superfamily, now in Carnoidea
- Conopidea - rank in Conopoidea
- Culicidea - rank in infraorder Culicomorpha
- Culicimorpha - misspelling? of Culicomorpha
- Dixidea - rank in infraorder Culicomorpha
- Drosophiloidea - superfamily, roughly equivalent to Ephydroidea
- Empididea - rank in Empidoidea
- Gastrophilidea - rank in family Oestridae
- Glossinidea - rank in superfamily Hippoboscoidea
- Heleomyzidea - superfamily, redistributed to Sphaeroceroidea, Sciomyzoidea and Opomyzoidea
- Hippoboscidea - rank in superfamily Hippoboscoidea
- Mesophantasmatidea - rank in infraorder Culicomorpha
- Muscidea - rank in superfamily Muscoidea
- Musidoromorpha - rank in superfamily Platypezoidea
- Myiomorpha - infraorder, roughly equivalent to Cyclorrhapha
- Nycteribiomorpha - rank in superfamily Hippoboscoidea
- Oestridea - rank in superfamily Oestroidea
- Orphnephilidea - rank in infraorder Culicomorpha
- Pachyneuridea - invalid superfamily in Bibionomorpha
- Phoromorpha - rank in superfamily Platypezoidea
- Phragmoligoneuridea - extinct rank in infraorder Culicomorpha
- Platypezidea - rank in superfamily Platypezoidea
- Psilidea - superfamily, redistributed to Diopsoidea and Nerioidea
- Pupipara - archaic equivalent of superfamily Hippoboscoidea
- Rhaetomyiidea - rank in infraorder Culicomorpha
- Rhyphidea - rank in infraorder Bibionomorpha
- Sapromyzidea - superfamily, redistributed between Lauxanioidea and Tephritoidea
- Sarcophagidea - rank in superfamily Oestroidea
- Somatiidea - superfamily, now in Diopsoidea
- Stratiomyidea - synonym for superfamily Stratiomyomorpha
- Streblomorpha - rank in superfamily Hippoboscoidea
- Syrphidea - rank in superfamily Syrphoidea
- Tabanidea - synonym for superfamily Tabanomorpha
- Tachinidea - rank in superfamily Oestroidea
- Termitoxeniomorpha - rank in superfamily Platypezoidea
- Trypetidea - superfamily, now in superfamily Tephritoidea
