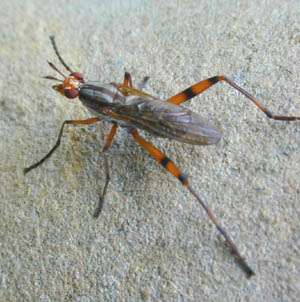
- Marsh fly (Sciomyzidae)

Scientific classification
- Kingdom: Animalia
- Phylum: Arthropoda
- Clade: Pancrustacea
- Class: Insecta
- Order: Diptera
- Suborder: Brachycera
- Infraorder: Muscomorpha
- Clade: Eremoneura
- Clade: Cyclorrhapha
- Section: Schizophora
- Subsection: Acalyptratae

Superfamilies
- Carnoidea; Conopoidea; Diopsoidea; Ephydroidea; Lauxanioidea; Lonchaeoidea; Nerioidea; Opomyzoidea; Sciomyzoidea; Sphaeroceroidea; Tephritoidea

= Acalyptratae =

Assemblage of flies

The Acalyptratae or Acalyptrata are a subsection of the Schizophora, which are a section of the order Diptera, the "true flies". In various contexts the Acalyptratae also are referred to informally as the acalyptrate muscoids, or acalyptrates, as opposed to the Calyptratae. All forms of the name refer to the lack of calypters in the members of this subsection of flies. An alternative name, Acalypterae is current, though in minority usage. It was first used by Pierre-Justin-Marie Macquart in 1835 for a section of his tribe Muscides; he used it to refer to all acalyptrates plus scathophagids and phorids, but excluding Conopidae.

The confusing forms of the names stem from their first usage; Acalyptratae and Acalyptrata actually are adjectival forms in Neo-Latin. They were coined in the mid 19th century in contexts such as "Muscae Calyptratae and Acalyptratae" and "Diptera Acalyptrata", and the forms stuck.

The Acalyptratae are a large assemblage, exhibiting very diverse habits, with one notable and perhaps surprising exception: no known acalyptrates are obligate blood-feeders (hematophagous), though blood feeding at various stages of the life history is common throughout other Dipteran sections.

== Classification ==
The classification of the Acalyptratae has varied over time, and the below list is likely to change in future.

- Subsection Acalyptratae
  - Superfamily Conopoidea
    - Conopidae
  - Superfamily Tephritoidea
    - Ctenostylidae
    - Eurygnathomyiidae
    - Lonchaeidae
    - Pallopteridae
    - Piophilidae
    - Platystomatidae
    - Pyrgotidae
    - Richardiidae
    - Tephritidae (including Tachiniscidae)
    - Ulidiidae
  - Superfamily Nerioidea
    - Cypselosomatidae
    - Fergusoninidae
    - Micropezidae
    - Neriidae
    - Pseudopomyzidae
    - Strongylophthalmyiidae
    - Tanypezidae
  - Superfamily Diopsoidea
    - Diopsidae
    - Gobryidae
    - Megamerinidae
    - Nothybidae
    - Psilidae
    - Somatiidae
    - Syringogastridae
  - Superfamily Sciomyzoidea
    - Coelopidae
    - Dryomyzidae
    - Helcomyzidae
    - Helosciomyzidae
    - Heterocheilidae
    - Ropalomeridae
    - Sepsidae
    - Sciomyzidae (including Huttoninidae and Phaeomyiidae)
  - Superfamily Sphaeroceroidea
    - Chyromyidae
    - Heleomyzidae
    - Heteromyzidae (disputed)
    - Nannodastiidae
    - Sphaeroceridae
  - Superfamily Lauxanioidea
    - Celyphidae
    - Chamaemyiidae
    - Lauxaniidae
  - Superfamily Opomyzoidea
    - Agromyzidae
    - Anthomyzidae
    - Asteiidae
    - Aulacigastridae
    - Clusiidae
    - Marginidae
    - Neminidae
    - Neurochaetidae
    - Odiniidae
    - Opomyzidae
    - Periscelididae
    - Teratomyzidae
    - Xenasteiidae
  - Superfamily Ephydroidea
    - Camillidae
    - Curtonotidae
    - Diastatidae
    - Drosophilidae
    - Ephydridae
    - Mormotomyiidae
  - Superfamily Carnoidea
    - Acartophthalmidae
    - Australimyzidae
    - Braulidae
    - Canacidae
    - Carnidae
    - Chloropidae
    - Cryptochetidae
    - Inbiomyiidae
    - Milichiidae
  - Acalyptratae incertae sedis
    - Paraleucopidae
