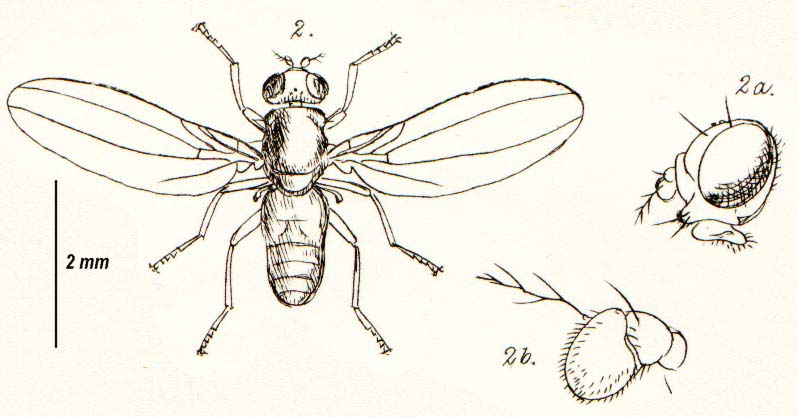
- Asteia amona from Walker Insecta Britannica Diptera
- Asteia wing veins

Scientific classification
- Domain: Eukaryota
- Kingdom: Animalia
- Phylum: Arthropoda
- Class: Insecta
- Order: Diptera
- Superfamily: Opomyzoidea
- Family: Asteiidae; Rondani, 1856

Subfamilies
- Asteiinae; Sigaloessinae

= Asteiidae =

Family of flies

Asteia amoena feeding on grass

Leiomyza scathophagina on fungus

Asteiidae is a small but widespread family of acalyptrate flies or Diptera. About 130 species in 10 genera have been described worldwide. They are rarely collected.

== Family description ==
For terms see Morphology of Diptera.

Adult asteiids are minute to small (1–3 millimeters) thin-bodied and delicate (often weakly sclerotized) flies, with yellow-black or dark colours. The wings are relatively long and transparent. The head is rounded, the male almost always with distinct interfrontal stripes. The arista may be bare or pubescent but usually has a zigzag of longer and shorter alternating rays. The postvertical bristles are weakly developed, divergent or parallel or totally absent. Ocellar bristles may be present or absent. There is one orbital bristle on each side of the frons (Shtakel'berg] (0–2 pairs of frontal bristles). Interfrontal bristles may be present as may scattered interfrontal setulae. Vibrissae may be absent or present. On the mesonotum are one to two pairs of dorsocentral bristles. The costa is entire, without interruptions; the subcosta is reduced; posterior basal wing cell and discoidal wing cell are fused; anal cell of wing and anal vein of wing are absent. Tibiae lack a dorsal preapical bristle.

See

== Biology ==
Adults are often found on flowers and low vegetation but have been collected at windows indoors and on tree wounds. In one genus (Leiomyza) adults are found on mushrooms and bracket fungi. Adults of the species Astiosoma rufifrons Duda are attracted to wood ash after bonfires especially at evening. Larval biologies are unknown, but adults have been reared from fungi (Leiomyza), stalks of Cannabis sativa, flower buds, and dried reed stems. Sabrosky (1987) suggested that the larvae may be scavengers in the frass of other insects.

== Species lists ==
- Palaearctic
- Nearctic
- Japan One species

== Identification (literature) ==
Sabrosky, C.W., 1943. New genera and species of Asteiidae (Diptera), with a review of the family in the Americas. Annals of the Entomological Society of America: 36(3):501-514. Available online at the Core Historical Literature of Agriculture, Albert R. Mann Library, Cornell University.

Sabrosky, C.W., 1956. Additions to the knowledge of Old World Asteiidae.Revue francaise d'entomologie (Nouvelle Serie) 23:216-243.

== Authorship ==
The family Asteiidae was erected by Hermann Loew

== Phylogeny ==
- Opomyzoidea
  - Clusioinea (Clusiidae)
  - - Agromyzoinea (Odiniidae+Fergusoninidae+Agromyzidae)
    - - Opomyzoinea (Opomyzidae+Anthomyzidae)
      - Asteioinea
        - Neurochaetidae+Aulacigastridae+Periscelididae
        - - Teratomyzidae
          - - Xenasteiidae
            - Asteiidae

== Images ==
See Images at Diptera.info

- Encyclopedia of Life World taxa list and images
