= Paraleucopidae =

Scientific classification
- Kingdom: Animalia
- Phylum: Arthropoda
- Clade: Pancrustacea
- Class: Insecta
- Order: Diptera
- Section: Schizophora
- Subsection: Acalyptratae
- Family: Paraleucopidae; Wheeler, 2019

Family of flies

The Paraleucopidae are a family of Acalyptratae flies first elevated to family level in 2019. Their placement within the acalyptrates is uncertain. Based on morphological evidence, they have been proposed to belong to the suprafamily Asteioinea within superfamily Opomyzoidea. However, transcriptomic data suggest they may instead belong to the superfamily Sphaeroceroidea. The clade includes the genera Paraleucopis, Mallochianamyia and Schizostomyia from the New World and undescribed species from Australia.

== Genera ==
- Mallochianamyia Santos-Neto, 1996
- Paraleucopis Malloch, 1913
- Schizostomyia Malloch, 1934
