= Somatia =

Scientific classification
- Kingdom: Animalia
- Phylum: Arthropoda
- Class: Insecta
- Order: Diptera
- Suborder: Brachycera
- Infraorder: Muscomorpha
- Clade: Eremoneura
- (unranked): Cyclorrhapha
- Section: Schizophora
- Superfamily: Diopsoidea
- Family: Somatiidae; Hendel, 1935
- Genus: Somatia; Schiner, 1868

Genus of flies

Somatia is the sole genus of the acalyptrate brachyceran fly family Somatiidae. The genus includes about seven Neotropical species of small (3-5 mm long) black and yellow flies with a stout and rounded thorax having transverse suture. The legs are separated from the main body by an elongated post-coxal bridge. The broad abdomen is downcurved. The antenna are elbowed with the arista bipectinate. Somatiids resemble members of the Syringogastridae due to the enlarged pronotum and a postcoxal bridge but they have a petiolate abdomen.

Adult Somatia have been found feeding on a dead caterpillar and aggregating on the extra-floral nectaries of Solanaceae, Bignoniaceae and Passifloraceae.

The placement of the group is doubtful, it is placed in the Diopsoidea but an incomplete phylogenetic analysis has suggested a closeness to the Agromyzidae.

Species in the genus include:

- Somatia aestiva
- Somatia australis
- Somatia carrerai
- Somatia lanei
- Somatia papaveroi
- Somatia schildi
- Somatia sophiston
