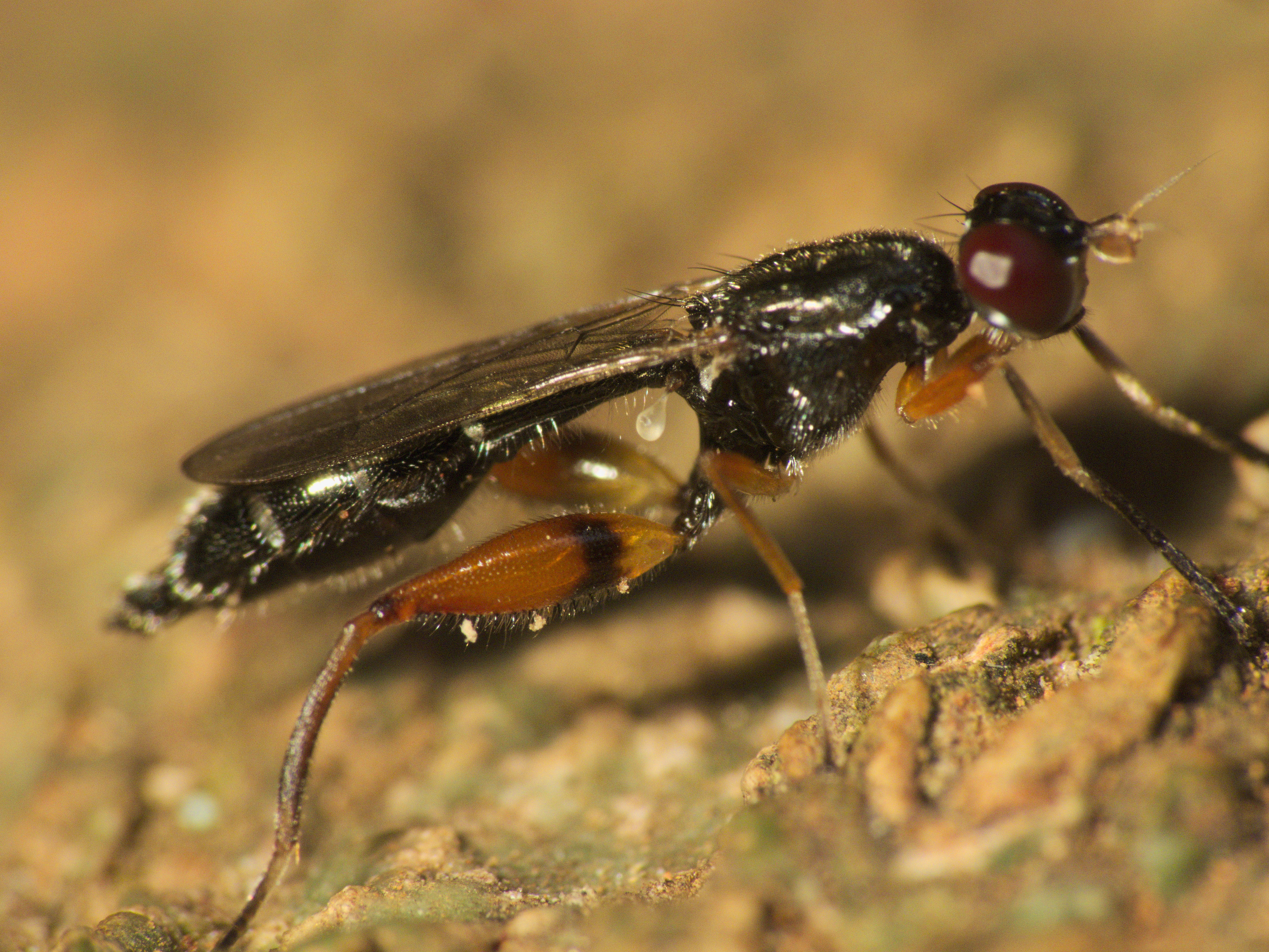
- Megamerina sp. from India

Scientific classification
- Domain: Eukaryota
- Kingdom: Animalia
- Phylum: Arthropoda
- Class: Insecta
- Order: Diptera
- Section: Schizophora
- Subsection: Acalyptratae
- Superfamily: Opomyzoidea
- Family: Megamerinidae; Hendel, 1913

Genera
- Protexara Yang; Megamerina Rondani; Texara Walker

= Megamerinidae =

Family of flies

The Megamerinidae are a family of flies (Diptera) with about 11 species in three genera. They are small and are marked by an elongated, basally constricted abdomen. The family has been variously placed in the past within the superfamilies Diopsoidea, Nerioidea and more recently in Opomyzoidea but the evolutionary relationships remain unclear.

== Description ==
For terms see Morphology of Diptera
These are slender, medium-sized flies, with long abdomens. The hind femora are thickened, and bear two rows of spinules on the lower side. The costa is entire and the anal cell is elongated. They have no ocelli.

== Biology ==
The biology of immature Megamerinidae is poorly known, but larvae have been recorded as predators living under bark or decaying vegetation.
