= Paraleucopis =

Scientific classification
- Domain: Eukaryota
- Kingdom: Animalia
- Phylum: Arthropoda
- Class: Insecta
- Order: Diptera
- Section: Schizophora
- Subsection: Acalyptratae
- Family: Paraleucopidae
- Genus: Paraleucopis; Malloch, 1913

Type species
- Paraleucopis corvina Malloch, 1913

Genus of flies

Paraleucopis is a genus of flies in the family Paraleucopidae. It was formerly placed in Chamaemyiidae.

== Species ==
- P. boydensis Steyskal, 1972
- P. corvina Malloch, 1913
- P. mexicana Steyskal, 1981
