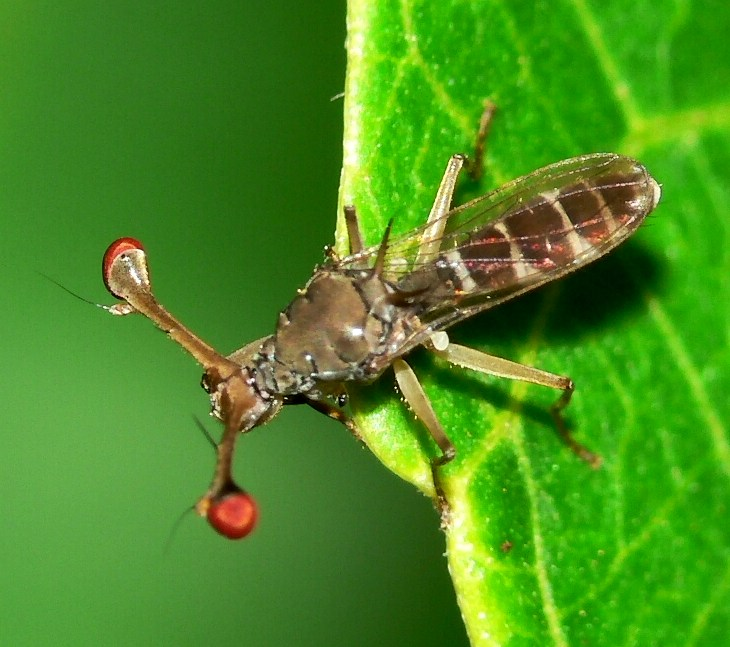
- A stalk-eyed fly from Cameroon

Scientific classification
- Kingdom: Animalia
- Phylum: Arthropoda
- Class: Insecta
- Order: Diptera
- (unranked): Cyclorrhapha
- Section: Schizophora
- Superfamily: Diopsoidea

Families
- Diopsidae - stalk-eyed flies Gobryidae; Megamerinidae; Nothybidae; Psilidae - rust flies Somatiidae; Syringogastridae

= Diopsoidea =

Superfamily of flies

The Diopsoidea are a small but diverse cosmopolitan superfamily of acalyptrate muscoids, especially prevalent in the tropics. Some flux exists in the family constituency of this group, with the Strongylophthalmyiidae and Tanypezidae formerly being in this group but now in the Nerioidea.

== Description ==
As flies, Diopsoidea undergo complete metamorphosis with the four life stages of egg, larva, pupa and adult. The adult stage has three body segments (head, thorax and abdomen), three pairs of legs and one pair of wings.

Some features that distinguish adult Diopsoidea from other flies are: a well-sclerotised face, antennae usually deflexed to strongly elbowed (if not, then either the fore or hind femur is entirely swollen), ocelli positioned near the vertex of the head, no katepisternal setae, wing veins R2+3 and R4+5 subparallel or slightly convergent apically, and the wing anal cell being comparable in size to the subcostal cell.
