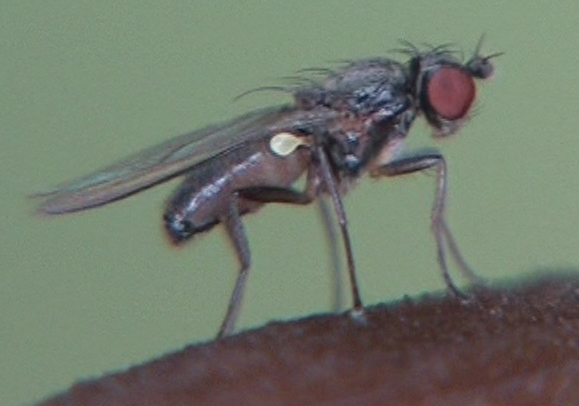
- Acartophthalmus nigrinus

Scientific classification
- Kingdom: Animalia
- Phylum: Arthropoda
- Clade: Pancrustacea
- Class: Insecta
- Order: Diptera
- Superfamily: Carnoidea
- Family: Acartophthalmidae
- Genus: Acartophthalmus; Czerny, 1902

Type species
- Anthophilina nigrinus Czerny, 1902

= Acartophthalmus =

Genus of flies

Acartophthalmus is a genus of flies, and the only genus with confident placement in the family Acartophthalmidae. They are 1.0–2.5 millimetres (0.04–0.10 in) long, and grey or black in colour, with pubescent arista. Only five species are included.

The biology of Acartophthalmus is almost unknown. The adults have mainly been found in forests, while larvae have been reared from dead wood and decaying organic material.

== Species ==
A. nigrinus

The five species included in the genus are:

- A. bicolor Oldenberg, 1910 — Holarctic
- A. coxata (Zetterstedt, 1848) — Europe
- A. latrinalis Ozerov, 1986 Russian Far East
- A. nigrinus (Zetterstedt, 1848) — Holarctic (common)
- A. pusio Frey, 1947 — Europe

Two of the species occur in the United Kingdom.
