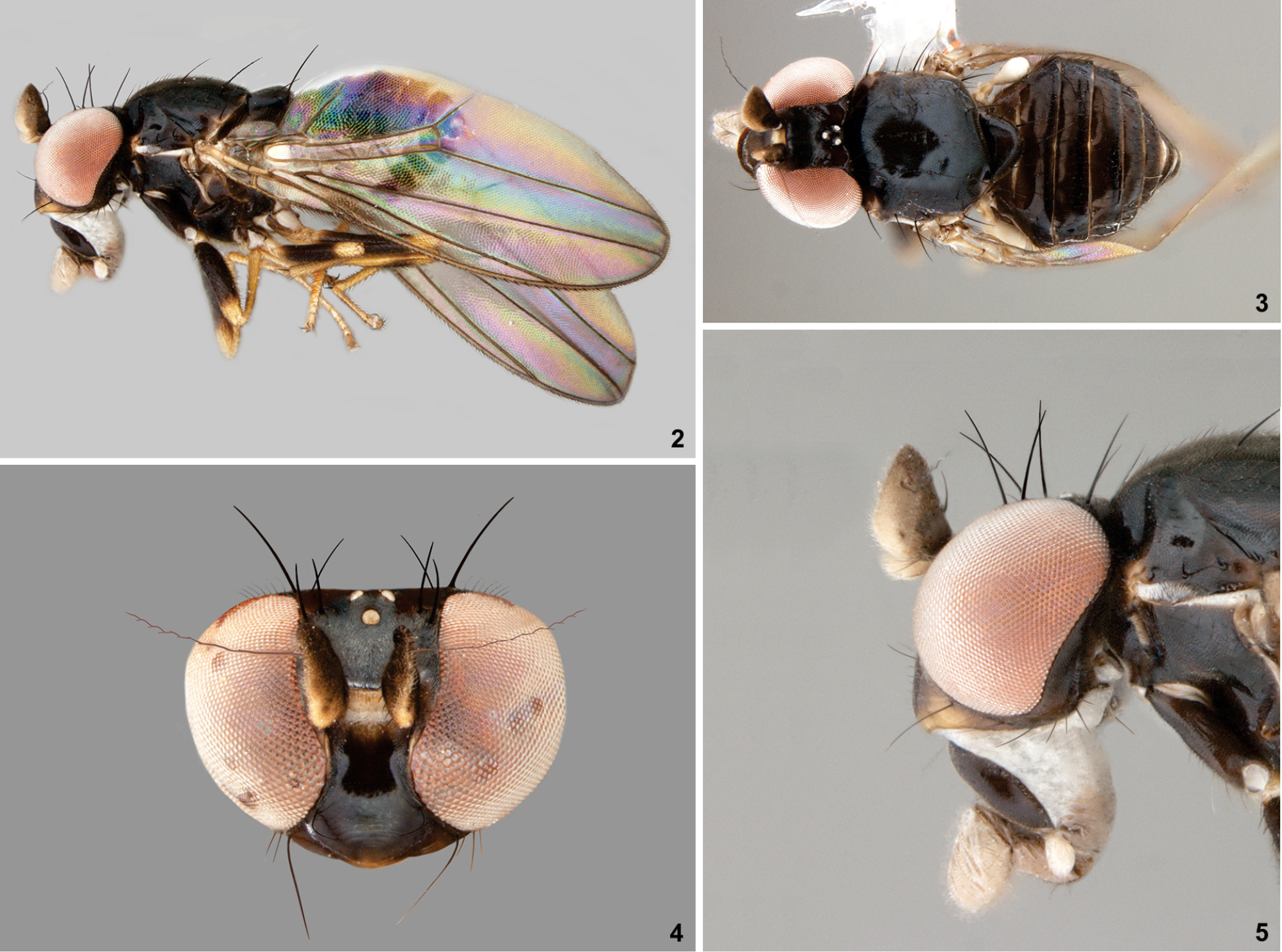
- Aulacigaster zurqui

Scientific classification
- Kingdom: Animalia
- Phylum: Arthropoda
- Clade: Pancrustacea
- Class: Insecta
- Order: Diptera
- Superfamily: Opomyzoidea
- Family: Aulacigastridae; Duda, 1921

Genera
- Aulacigaster Macquart, 1835; Planinasus Cresson; Protaulacigaster Hennig, 1965

Synonyms
- Aulacigastreridae

= Aulacigastridae =

Family of flies

Aulacigastridae is a very small family of flies known as sap flies. The family Stenomicridae used to be included within this family, but was moved by Papp in 1984. They are found in all the Ecoregions.

== Description ==
For terms see Morphology of Diptera.

Aulacigastrids are small black flies. The head is rounded. Postvertical bristles and ocellar bristles are absent, there are two orbital bristles on each side of frons, the anterior orbital bristle directed forward and towards median line. Vibrissae are well developed. On the mesonotum there are two pairs of dorsocentral bristles. The costa is interrupted near the subcosta (which reaches the costa). The posterior basal wing cell and discoidal wing cell are fused and the anal vein does not reach the margin of the wings.

== Biology ==
The larvae of sap flies feed on the sap of deciduous and coniferous trees (sap runs) and feed on micro-organisms within the sap. Adults feed on nectar, and other fermenting substances.

== Species lists ==
- West Palaearctic including Russia
- Nearctic
- Australasian/Oceanian
- Japan
- World list

== Identification ==
- Duda. 1934. Aulacigastridae. In Lindner, In: Lindner, E. (Ed.). Die Fliegen der Paläarktischen Region 6,1,58c, 1–5. Keys to Palaearctic species but now needs revision (in German).
- Stackelberg, A.A. Family Aulacigastridae in Bei-Bienko, G. Ya, 1988 Keys to the insects of the European Part of the USSR Volume 5 (Diptera) Part 2 English edition. Keys to Palaearctic species but now needs revision.

== Phylogeny ==
- Opomyzoidea
  - Clusioinea (Clusiidae)
  - - Agromyzoinea (Odiniidae+Fergusoninidae+Agromyzidae)
    - - Opomyzoinea (Opomyzidae+Anthomyzidae)
      - Asteioinea
        - Neurochaetidae+Aulacigastridae+Periscelididae
        - - Teratomyzidae
          - - Xenasteiidae
            - Asteiidae
