= Colless =

Colless is a family name and may refer to the following:

- Rick Colless (born 1952), Australian politician
- Donald Henry Colless (1922−2012), Australian entomologist
