= Ptilinum =

Component of fly anatomy

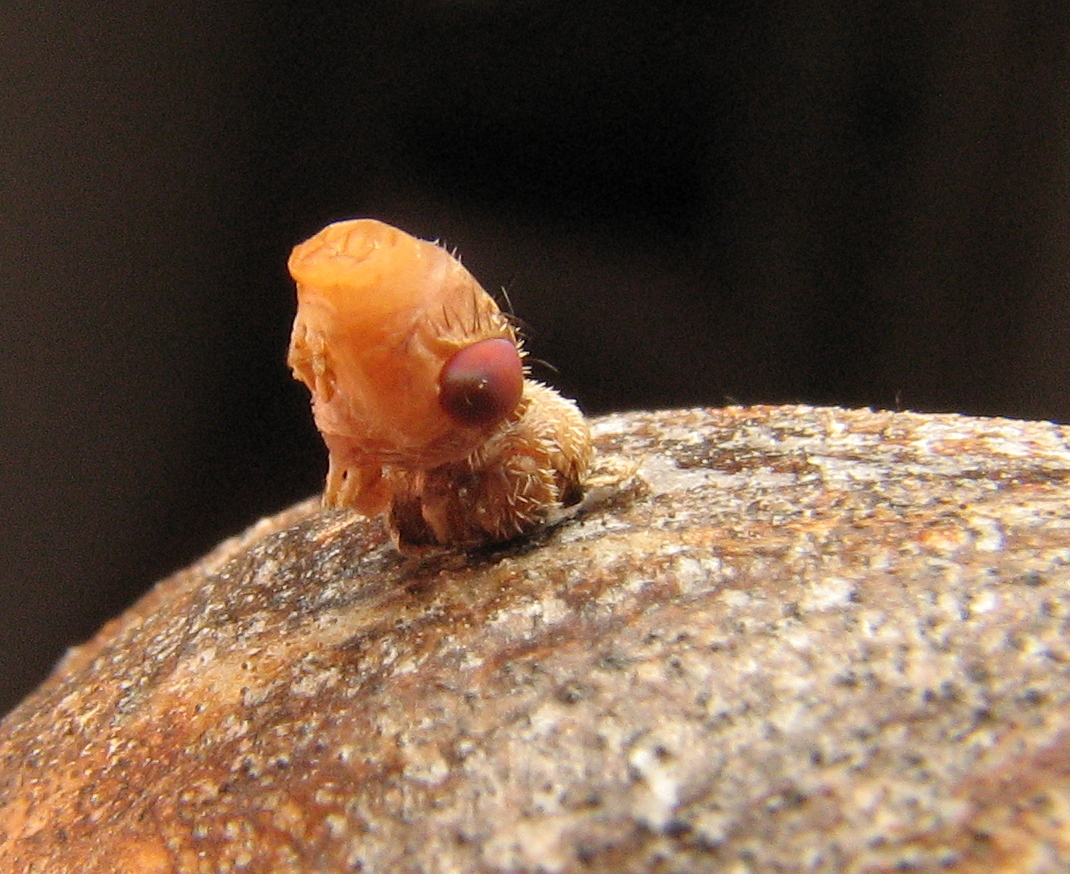
Eurosta solidaginis emerging from goldenrod gall. Notice the ptilinum used to make a hole

The ptilinum is an eversible pouch on the head, above the base of the antenna in schizophoran flies (a section of muscomorphan and cyclorrhaphan flies). It is used to force off the end of the puparium in order for the fly to emerge, and after this inflation at emergence, the ptilinum collapses back inside the head, marked thereafter only by the ptilinal suture or frontal suture (which defines the aperture through which it everts).

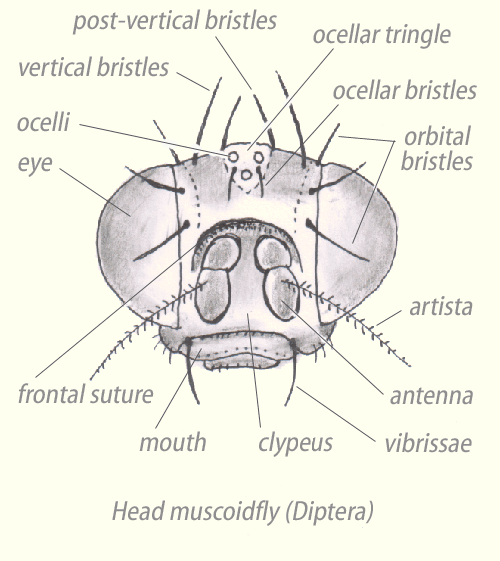
Muscoid head:Frontal suture
