= Natalimyza =

Scientific classification
- Kingdom: Animalia
- Phylum: Arthropoda
- Clade: Pancrustacea
- Class: Insecta
- Order: Diptera
- Section: Schizophora
- Subsection: Acalyptratae
- Superfamily: Sciomyzoidea
- Family: Natalimyzidae; Barraclough & McAlpine, 2006
- Genus: Natalimyza; Barraclough & McAlpine, 2006

Type species
- Natalimyza milleri

Genus of flies

Natalimyza is a genus of flies placed in the family Natalimyzidae and known as African grass flies. There are about 30 species in Africa which are found mainly in grasslands where their larvae are thought to feed on decaying plant material. They are small (less than 5 mm or 0.20 in long) yellow to brown and appear like flies in the families Chyromyidae or Opomyzidae, but differentiated by bristles on the head, having four fronto-orbital bristles.
