= Synneuron decipiens =

Scientific classification
- Domain: Eukaryota
- Kingdom: Animalia
- Phylum: Arthropoda
- Class: Insecta
- Order: Diptera
- Family: Canthyloscelidae
- Genus: Synneuron
- Species: S. decipiens

Binomial name
- Synneuron decipiens Hutson, 1977

Species of fly

Synneuron decipiens is a species of nematoceran flies in the family Canthyloscelidae.
