= Teratomyzidae =

Scientific classification
- Kingdom: Animalia
- Phylum: Arthropoda
- Clade: Pancrustacea
- Class: Insecta
- Order: Diptera
- Infraorder: Muscomorpha
- Clade: Eremoneura
- (unranked): Cyclorrhapha
- Section: Schizophora
- Subsection: Acalyptratae
- Superfamily: Opomyzoidea
- Family: Teratomyzidae; Colless & McAlpine, 1970

Family of flies

Teratomyzidae are a family of small flies found mainly in the southern continents and are absent from Europe, North America, and Africa. They are specialist feeders on fern fronds. There are about thirty five species. They appear somewhat like anthomyzids, the body is elongated and appear dusty coated. The antenna are somewhat as in Aulacigastridae and Neminidae. The wing is distinctive in its venation, the costa is weake after the humeral crossvein and broken before vein 1 with an elongate dorsal bristle before the break. Vein 1 short and joins costa within quarter length of the wing. Vein 6 terminates beyond discal crossvein.

The genera in the family include:

- Teratomyza
- Camur
- Stepta
- Teratoptera
- Lips
- Pous
- Auster
