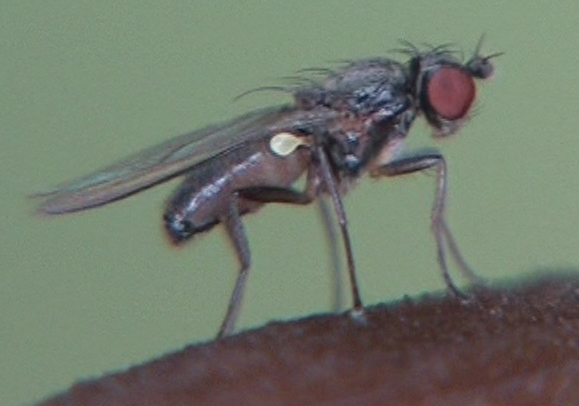
- Acartophthalmus nigrinus

Scientific classification
- Kingdom: Animalia
- Phylum: Arthropoda
- Clade: Pancrustacea
- Class: Insecta
- Order: Diptera
- Section: Schizophora
- Subsection: Acalyptratae
- Superfamily: Carnoidea
- Family: Acartophthalmidae; Czerny, 1928

= Acartophthalmidae =

Family of flies

The Acartophthalmidae are a family of very small (1.0-2.5 mm), dark flies with pubescent arista and having ocelli, placed in the order Diptera. All are Holarctic in distribution. Two fossil species are known, with uncertain placement.

== Genera ==
Flies in the family have a pubescent arista on the antenna. They have ocelli and a characteristic bristle pattern on the head. The wing is sometimes tinged along the costa and there is a humeral break in the costal vein.

- †Acartophthalmites Hennig, 1965
- Acartophthalmus Czerny, 1902

== Biology ==
Adults have been found mostly in forests, often on fungi and decaying wood. Larvae have been reared from dead wood and decaying organic material.
