= Synneuron =

Scientific classification
- Domain: Eukaryota
- Kingdom: Animalia
- Phylum: Arthropoda
- Class: Insecta
- Order: Diptera
- Family: Canthyloscelidae
- Genus: Synneuron; Lundström, 1910

Genus of flies

Synneuron is a genus of gnats, gall midges, and March flies in the family Canthyloscelidae. There are at least four described species in Synneuron.

== Species ==
These four species belong to the genus Synneuron:

- Synneuron annulipes Lundstrom, 1910
- Synneuron decipens Hutson, 1977
- Synneuron decipiens Hutson, 1977
- Synneuron sylvestre Mamaev & Krivosheina, 1969
