= Ctenostylidae =

Scientific classification
- Kingdom: Animalia
- Phylum: Arthropoda
- Class: Insecta
- Order: Diptera
- Section: Schizophora
- Subsection: Acalyptratae
- Superfamily: Tephritoidea
- Family: Ctenostylidae; Bigot, 1882

Genera
- Ctenostylum; Furciseta; Lochmostylia; Nepaliseta; Ramuliseta; Sinolochmostylia; Tauroscypson

Family of flies

The enigmatic fly family Ctenostylidae is a small group of very rare flies formerly included in the family Pyrgotidae (as the subfamily "Lochmostyliinae"); the principal reason for their inclusion in the Pyrgotidae was the absence of ocelli, a feature originally thought to be a unique defining feature ("autapomorphy") of the Pyrgotidae. Subsequent careful analysis has revealed that this anatomical feature shared with Pyrgotidae may not be indicative of a close relationship, and even the inclusion of Ctenostylidae within the superfamily Tephritoidea was cast into doubt, leaving this as the only family of Acalyptratae presently unassignable to superfamily.

There are fewer than 20 described species in 7 genera in this pantropical family, all characterized not only by the lack of ocelli, but the lack of functional mouthparts, and unusual modifications of the antennal arista; it is the only family of Diptera where the arista has two or more branches. All but one of the described species are known from fewer than 10 specimens. The male antennal arista is simple and unmodified. So far as is known, females are viviparous, laying larvae instead of eggs; larval biology is unknown, but it is assumed they are parasitoids.
