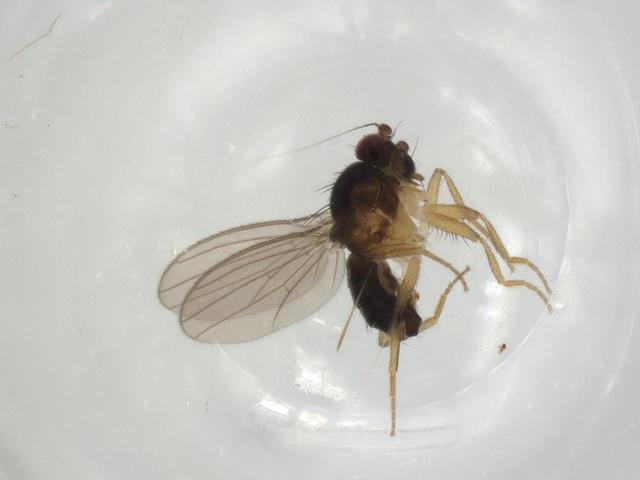

Scientific classification
- Kingdom: Animalia
- Phylum: Arthropoda
- Class: Insecta
- Order: Diptera
- Subsection: Acalyptratae
- Superfamily: Carnoidea
- Family: Inbiomyiidae
- Genus: Inbiomyia; Buck, 2006

= Inbiomyia =

Family of flies

The Inbiomyiidae are a family of flies first described in 2006. 11 species have been described all in the genus Inbiomyia distributed in the Neotropical region. These are very small, mostly dark flies. The larval biology remains unknown.

== Family characteristics ==
For terms see Morphology of Diptera. Inbiomyiidae are minute to small (1.3 to 1.6 mm) flies.

Characteristics of the family include an extremely shortened head with nonfunctional ptilinum and reduced chaetotaxy and a shortened first flagellomere with very elongate, dorsoapically inserted arista. The labellar lobes of the proboscis are largely separate and point in different directions. The mid tibia lacks an apicoventral bristle. There are also unusual features of the male and female genitalia.

The eggs are large and extremely flattened and are only present in the female abdomen in small numbers.

== Species ==
- Inbiomyia acmophallus Buck, 2006
- Inbiomyia anemosyris Buck, 2006
- Inbiomyia anodonta Buck, 2006
- Inbiomyia azevedoi Riccardi & Amorim, 2019
- Inbiomyia empheres Buck, 2006
- Inbiomyia exul Buck, 2006
- Inbiomyia matamata Buck, 2006
- Inbiomyia mcalpineorum Buck, 2006
- Inbiomyia pterygion Buck, 2006
- Inbiomyia regina Buck, 2006
- Inbiomyia scoliostylus Buck, 2006
- Inbiomyia zeugodonta Buck, 2006
