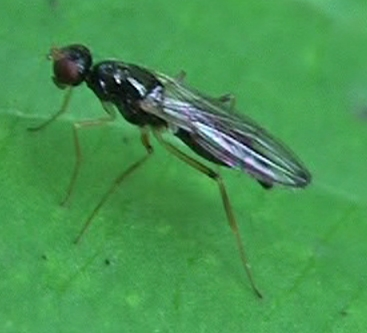
- Strongylophthalmyia ustulata

Scientific classification
- Domain: Eukaryota
- Kingdom: Animalia
- Phylum: Arthropoda
- Class: Insecta
- Order: Diptera
- Family: Strongylophthalmyiidae
- Genus: Strongylophthalmyia; Heller, 1902

Type species
- Chyliza ustulata Zetterstedt, 1844

Synonyms
- Strongylophthalmus Hendel 1902; Labropsila Meijere 1914

= Strongylophthalmyia =

Genus of flies

Strongylophthalmyia are a genus of slender, long-legged flies, the majority of which occur in the Oriental and Australasian regions.

== Species ==
- S. albisternum Evenhuis, 2016 - Thailand.
- S. angustipennis Melander, 1920
- S. bifasciata Yang & Wang, 1992
- S. borneensis Evenhuis, 2016 - Borneo.
- S. brunneipennis (De Meijere, 1914)
- S. caestus Evenhuis, 2016 - Philippines.
- S. caliginosa Iwasa, 1992
- S. coarctata Hendel, 1913
- S. crinita Hennig, 1940
- S. darlingi Evenhuis, 2016 - Sumatra.
- S. dorsocentralis Papp, 2006 - Thailand.
- S. federeri Evenhuis, 2016 - Philippines. Named after tennis champion Roger Federer because of its distinctive racquet-shaped male palpus.
- S. freidbergi Shatalkin, 1996
- S. gibbifera Shatalkin, 1993
- S. hauseri Evenhuis, 2016 - Thailand, Vietnam.
- S. immaculata Hennig, 1940 - Taiwan.
- S. indochinensis Evenhuis, 2016 - Cambodia, Thailand, Vietnam.
- S. inundans Evenhuis, 2016 - Philippines.
- S. laosensis Evenhuis, 2016 - Laos.
- S. lowi Evenhuis, 2016 - Malay Peninsula.
- S. lutea (De Meijere, 1914)
- S. macrocera Papp, 2006 - Thailand.
- S. malayensis Evenhuis, 2016 - Malay Peninsula.
- S. metatarsata De Meijere, 1919
- S. microstyla Shatalkin, 1996 - Philippines.
- S. nigricoxa (De Meijere, 1914)
- S. nigripalpis Evenhuis, 2016 - Malay Peninsula.
- S. oxybeles Evenhuis, 2016 - Sumatra.
- S. palpalis Papp, 2006 - Thailand.
- S. pappi Evenhuis, 2016 - Thailand.
- S. pectinigera Shatalkin, 1996
- S. pengellyi Barber, 2007 - Canada, United States.
- S. phillindablank Evenhuis, 2016 - Yunnan (China).
- S. pictipes Frey, 1935
- S. polita (De Meijere, 1914)
- S. punctata Hennig, 1940 - Taiwan.
- S. sichuanica Evenhuis, 2016 - Sichuan (China).
- S. spinosa Frey, 1956 - Northern Burma.
- S. sumatrana Evenhuis, 2016 - Sumatra.
- S. thaii Papp, 2006 - Thailand.
- S. thailandica Evenhuis, 2016 - Thailand.
- S. ustulata (Zetterstedt, 1844) - Europe.
- S. verrucifera Shatalkin, 1996
