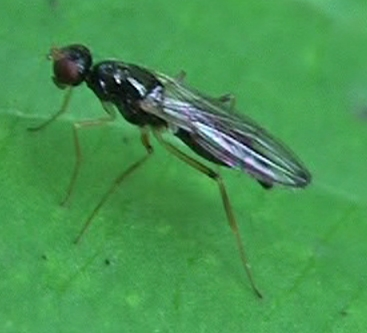

Scientific classification
- Kingdom: Animalia
- Phylum: Arthropoda
- Clade: Pancrustacea
- Class: Insecta
- Order: Diptera
- Family: Strongylophthalmyiidae
- Genus: Strongylophthalmyia
- Species: S. ustulata

Binomial name
- Strongylophthalmyia ustulata (Zetterstedt, 1844)

Synonyms
- Chyliza ustulata Zetterstedt, 1844

= Strongylophthalmyia ustulata =

Species of fly

Strongylophthalmyia is a species of slender, long-legged fly.

== Distribution ==
It is found in Europe (Andorra, Britain, Czech Republic, Denmark, Estonia, Finland, Germany, Hungary, Latvia, Poland, Romania, Slovakia, and Sweden).
