= Exiliscelis =

Scientific classification
- Domain: Eukaryota
- Kingdom: Animalia
- Phylum: Arthropoda
- Class: Insecta
- Order: Diptera
- Family: Canthyloscelidae
- Genus: Exiliscelis; Hutson, 1977
- Species: E. californiensis

Binomial name
- Exiliscelis californiensis Hutson, 1977

Genus of flies

Exiliscelis is a genus of gnats, gall midges, and March flies in the family Canthyloscelidae. There is one described species in Exiliscelis, E. californiensis.
