= Nannodastiidae =

Scientific classification
- Domain: Eukaryota
- Kingdom: Animalia
- Phylum: Arthropoda
- Class: Insecta
- Order: Diptera
- Superfamily: Sphaeroceroidea
- Family: Nannodastiidae; Papp, 1980

Genera
- Azorastia Frey, 1945; Nannodastia Hendel, 1930

Family of flies

Nannodastiidae are a small family of acalyptrate flies placed in two genera. They were formerly included within the Ephydridae or shore flies. These are small to minute flies which are dull coloured with clear wings. They are identified by a combination of setal characters visible only under a microscope and genital features which require specimen dissection. They are found along coasts and in bat caves rich in guano.
