= Donald Henry Colless =

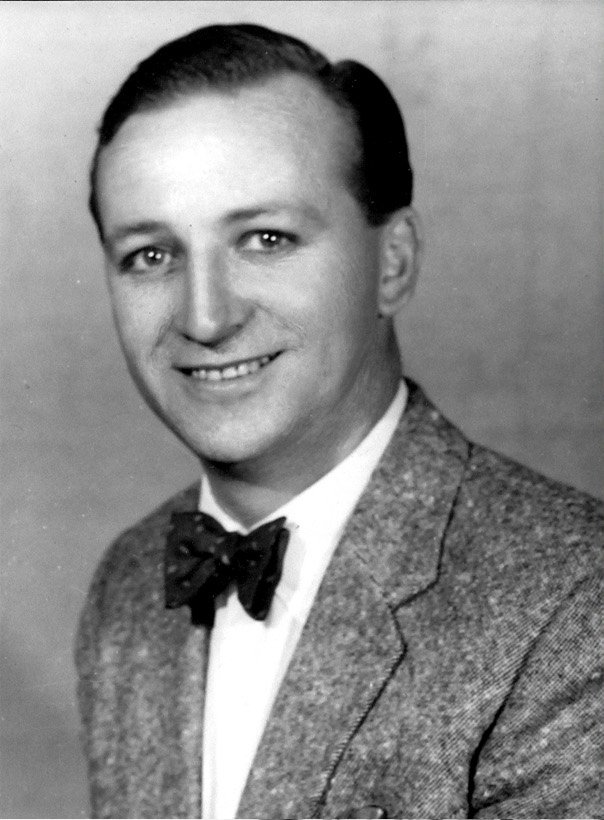
- Colless in his twenties
- Born: 22 August 1922; Uralla, New South Wales, Australia
- Died: 16 February 2012 (aged 89)
- Education: University of Sydney
- Scientific career
- Fields: Taxonomy

Donald Henry Colless (24 August 1922 – 16 February 2012), also known simply as Don Colless, was an Australian entomologist. He was an authority on true flies (Diptera).

== Career ==
Colless was born in Uralla, a small town in the Northern Tablelands of New South Wales. In 1947, he graduated to Bachelor of Agricultural Science at the University of Sydney. In the same year he joined the CSIRO for which he worked in North Borneo (now Sabah) from 1947 to 1952. Subsequently he worked for eight years at the University of Malaya in Singapore where he promoted to Ph.D. in 1956. During that time he conducted mosquito research with a special focus on actual and potential disease vectors.

In 1960 he returned to the CSIRO where worked as taxonomist at the Australian National Insect Collection (ANIC) until he retired in 1987. From 1971 to 1977 he was the chief curator of the ANIC.

Colless described the two fly families Perissommatidae and Axiniidae, 13 new genera, including Valeseguya, Perissomma, Colonomyia, and Chetoneura as well as 120 new species, including the mosquitoes Aedes malayensis, Anopheles saungi, Anopheles stookesi, Culex alienus, and Culex pseudovishnui.

== Research ==
Aside from entomology Colless was also very interested in the theory and philosophy of taxonomy and classification. Colless published 30 influential articles on the philosophical underpinnings and theory of taxonomy from 1966–1996. In total, he published 127 scientific papers and book chapters.

His most cited and perhaps most utilized contribution is entitled Congruence between morphometric and allozyme data for Menidia species: a reappraisal, in which he devised the calculation of the consensus fork index (CFI), which is sometimes referred to as Colless' index.
