= Gobryidae =

Scientific classification
- Kingdom: Animalia
- Phylum: Arthropoda
- Class: Insecta
- Order: Diptera
- Section: Schizophora
- Superfamily: Diopsoidea
- Family: Gobryidae; McAlpine, 1997
- Genus: Gobrya; Walker, 1860

Family of flies

External image
- Image at iNaturalist

Gobryidae is a monotypic family of flies containing the genus Gobrya, described by Francis Walker in 1860. They are relatively rare and found in Southeast Asia, Taiwan, Indonesia, Malaysia, the Philippines, and New Guinea. Gobryids are often metallic in coloration and their heads are wider than the rest of their bodies. Very little is known about the larval habits of these flies. McAlpine (1997) elevated the genus to family level. More research is needed to determine the best phylogenetic placement for Gobrya.

== Genus and species ==
The following are included in BioLib.cz and the Global Biodiversity Information Facility:

- Gobrya Walker
1. Gobrya bacchoides Walker, 1860
2. Gobrya cyanea (Enderlein, 1920)
3. Gobrya cylindrica (Walker, 1859)
4. Gobrya simulans Meijere, 1911
5. Gobrya syrphoides (Hendel, 1913)
