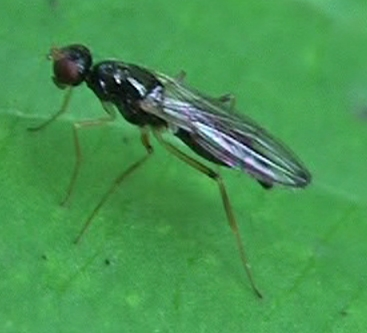
- Strongylophthalmyia ustulata

Scientific classification
- Kingdom: Animalia
- Phylum: Arthropoda
- Clade: Pancrustacea
- Class: Insecta
- Order: Diptera
- Section: Schizophora
- Subsection: Acalyptratae
- Superfamily: Nerioidea
- Family: Strongylophthalmyiidae; Hendel, 1917

Genera
- Nartshukia Shatalkin, 1993; Strongylophthalmyia Heller, 1902

= Strongylophthalmyiidae =

Family of flies

The Strongylophthalmyiidae are a small family of about 80 species of slender, long-legged flies, the majority of which occur in the Oriental and Australasian regions. They are divided into two genera, the monotypic Southeast Asian genus Nartshukia Shatalkin, 1993 and Strongylophthalmyia Heller, 1902. The relationships of the group are obscure; formerly the genus Strongylophthalmyia was classified with the Psilidae, and some recent classifications place it within the Tanypezidae. Little is known of their biology, but many species seem to be associated with rotting bark.

== Species ==
S. ustulata

- Genus Strongylophthalmyia Heller, 1902

- S. angustipennis Melander, 1920
- S. brunneipennis (De Meijere, 1914)
- S. caliginosa Iwasa, 1992
- S. coarctata Hendel, 1913
- S. crinita Hennig, 1940
- S. dorsocentralis Papp, 2006
- S. freidbergi Shatalkin, 1996
- S. gibbifera Shatalkin, 1993
- S. lutea (De Meijere, 1914)
- S. macrocera Papp, 2006
- S. metatarsata De Meijere, 1919
- S. nigricoxa (De Meijere, 1914)
- S. palpalis Papp, 2006
- S. pectinigera Shatalkin, 1996
- S. pengellyi Barber, 2006
- S. pictipes Frey 1935
- S. polita (De Meijere, 1914)
- S. punctata Hennig, 1940
- S. thaii Papp, 2006
- S. ustulata (Zetterstedt, 1844)
- S. verrucifera Shatalkin, 1996

- Genus Nartshukia Shatalkin, 1993

- N. musiva Shatalkin, 1993
