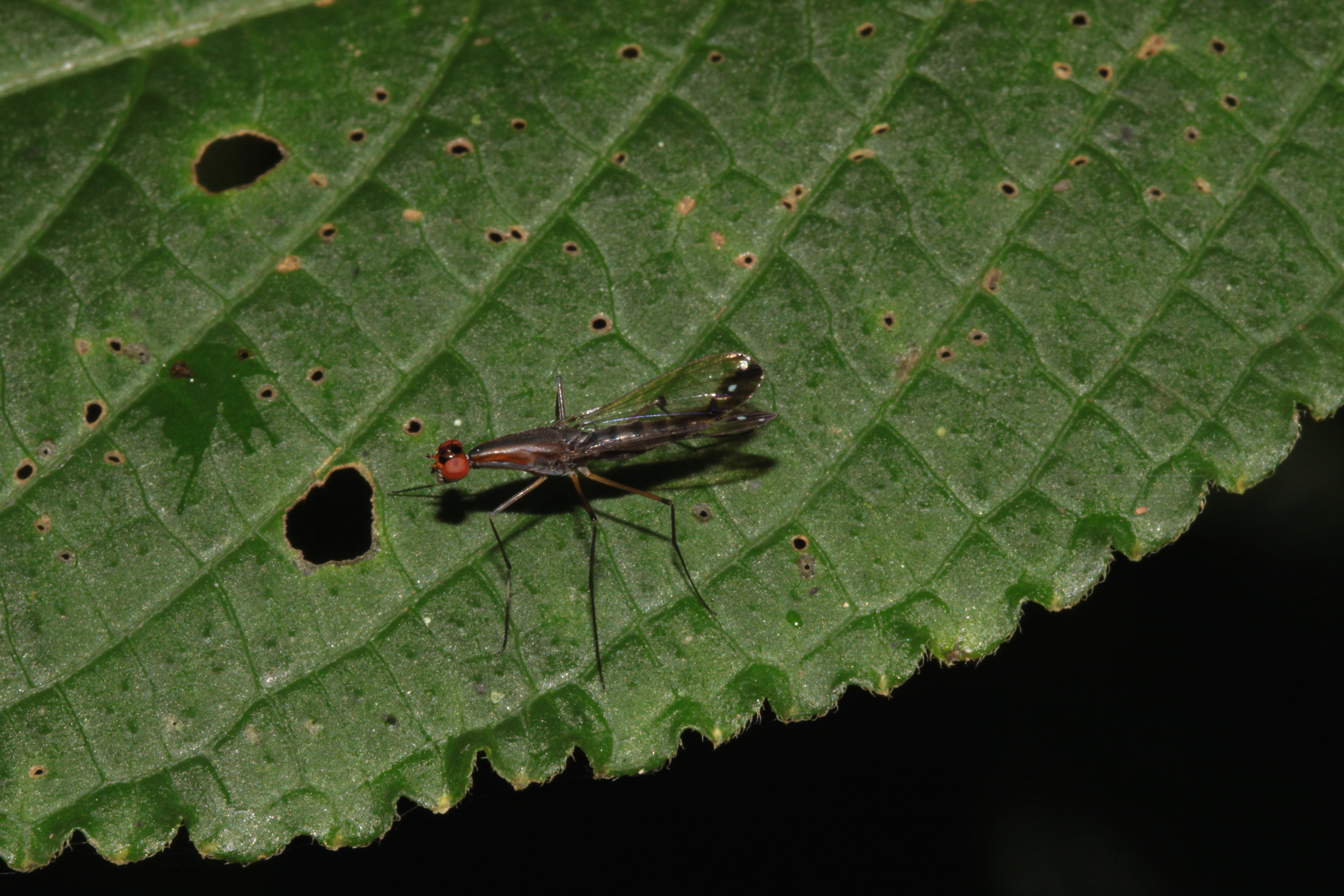
- Nothybidae

Scientific classification
- Domain: Eukaryota
- Kingdom: Animalia
- Phylum: Arthropoda
- Class: Insecta
- Order: Diptera
- Section: Schizophora
- Superfamily: Diopsoidea
- Family: Nothybidae; Frey, 1927
- Genus: Nothybus; Rondani, 1875

Type species
- N. longithorax Rondani, 1875

Species
- See text

= Nothybus =

Genus of flies

The family Nothybidae contains only the genus Nothybus, a group of colorful and elongated flies. The family has been recently revised.

== Taxonomy and description ==
The morphology of Nothybidae is distinctive. The prothorax is elongated, with the front legs arising far back on the thorax, posterior to the anterior thoracic spiracles, making their heads appear to rest on a long neck. They are also distinguished by their narrow wing bases, patterned wings, rayed aristae, and the swollen subscutellum. Twelve nothybid species are described. First placed in Micropezidae, Frey recognized Nothybus as deserving a suprageneric rank, and Aczel also recognized the family Nothybidae. While this group is placed in the Diopsoidea, its evolutionary relationships have never been robustly tested in a modern phylogenetic framework with molecular or morphological data. It is one of the few fly families for which no DNA data are available on NCBI GenBank.

== Biology ==
The biology of the Nothybidae is poorly known, and the larval habitat is unknown. Some species may be larviparous, as mature larvae have been found in preserved adult female specimens. Adults have been observed displaying complex hovering and courtship behavior.

== Distribution ==
Species of the genus Nothybus are only found in Southeast Asia.

== Species ==
- Nothybus absens Lonsdale & Marshall, 2016 – southern China
- Nothybus acrobates Frey, 1958 – Myanmar and Laos
- Nothybus biguttatus v.d. Wulp, 1896 – Java, Nepal, and Vietnam
- Nothybus cataractus Lonsdale & Marshall, 2016 – Thailand and Laos
- Nothybus kempi (Brunetti, 1913) – India, Myanmar, Laos, Thailand, and Vietnam
- Nothybus kuznetsovorum Galinskaya & Shatalkin, 2015 – Laos and Vietnam
- Nothybus lineifer Enderlein, 1922 – Java, Malaysia, Sumatra, and Thailand
- Nothybus longicollis (Walker, 1856) - Borneo, Malaysia, Papua New Guinea
- Nothybus magnus Galinskaya & Shatalkin, 2017 – Thailand
- Nothybus procerus Lonsdale & Marshall, 2016 - southern India
- Nothybus sumatranus Enderlein, 1922 – Malaysia, Sumatra, Thailand, and Vietnam
- Nothybus triguttatus Bezzi, 1916 – Philippines

There are reports of additional undescribed species from Papua New Guinea and the Solomon Islands.
