= Syringogaster =

Scientific classification
- Domain: Eukaryota
- Kingdom: Animalia
- Phylum: Arthropoda
- Class: Insecta
- Order: Diptera
- Section: Schizophora
- Superfamily: Diopsoidea
- Family: Syringogastridae; Prado, 1969
- Genus: Syringogaster; Cresson, 1912

Species
- See text

Genus of flies

Syringogaster is a genus of small (4 to 6 mm) ant-mimicking flies with a petiolate abdomen, a long prothorax, a swollen and spiny hind femur, and reduced head size and large eyes. There are 20 described extant species and two species known from Miocene amber from the Dominican Republic. It is the only genus in the family Syringogastridae.

== Distribution ==
The genus Syringogaster are found in tropical areas of the Neotropical region, with exception of the Antilles. Syringogastridae inhabit tropical forests.

== Biology ==
Very little is known about the biology of Syringogastridae, and no larvae are known.

== Classification ==
The descriptor Ezra Townsend Cresson placed his new genus in the family Psilidae then in 1969 Angelo Pires do Prado erected a new family (Syringogastridae) to contain the genus.

== Species ==
- S. amazonensis Prado, 1969
- S. apiculata Marshall & Buck, 2009
- S. atricalyx Marshall & Buck, 2009
- S. brachypecta Marshall & Buck, 2009
- S. brunnea Cresson, 1912:
- S. brunneina Marshall & Buck, 2009
- S. carioca Prado, 1969
- S. craigi Grimaldi, 2009 (Fossil species)
- S. cressoni Prado, 1969
- S. dactylopleura Marshall & Buck, 2009
- S. figurata Marshall & Buck, 2009
- S. lanei Prado, 1969
- S. lopesi Prado, 1969
- S. miocenecus Grimaldi, 2009 (Fossil species)
- S. nigrithorax Marshall & Buck, 2009
- S. palenque Marshall & Buck, 2009
- S. papaveroi Prado, 1969
- S. plesioterga Marshall & Buck, 2009
- S. rufa Cresson, 1912
- S. sharkeyi Marshall & Buck, 2009
- S. subnearctica Feijen, 1989
- S. tenuipes Marshall & Buck, 2009
