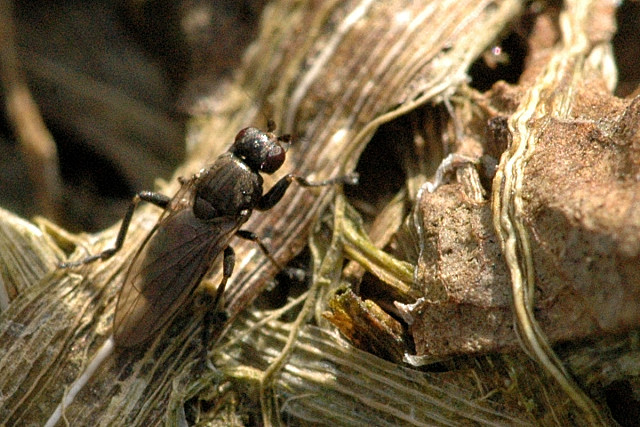
- Limosina silvatica

Scientific classification
- Kingdom: Animalia
- Phylum: Arthropoda
- Clade: Pancrustacea
- Class: Insecta
- Order: Diptera
- Section: Schizophora
- Subsection: Acalyptratae
- Superfamily: Sphaeroceroidea

Families
- Chyromyidae; Heleomyzidae - incl. Trixoscelididae & Rhinotoridae; Heteromyzidae; Nannodastiidae; Sphaeroceridae

= Sphaeroceroidea =

Lesser dung flies and allies

Superfamily of flies

Sphaeroceroidea is a superfamily of flies. It includes the cosmopolitan families of Sphaeroceridae (small dung flies), Heleomyzidae, and Chyromyidae, as well as a few smaller groups. It has about 2,600 species.

== Description ==
Sphaeroceroids tend to be small flies a few millimetres in length. Each of the families has its own distinguishing traits. For example, Sphaeroceridae have black wings with an interrupted costa, and the first tarsomere of the hind leg is short and thick. Nannodastiidae are even smaller than usual for sphaeroceroids, with adults being 0.70-1.25 mm long, and their legs lack long setae.

== Ecology ==
Larvae generally live and feed on various kinds of decaying organic matter, including manure, seaweed, fungi, rotting wood, compost and carrion.

Nannodastiidae have a more restricted lifestyle. Adults have usually been found in tropical and subtropical beaches, often in caves or under cliff overhangs. The larvae are unknown, but they may be in the droppings of birds and mammals which are abundant in such habitats.

== Taxonomy ==
The taxonomic composition of Sphaeroceroidea has been disputed. In 2007, there was a proposal to combine the families Heleomyzidae and Sphaeroceridae into one family, Heteromyzidae. Other, more recent studies have kept these two families separate.

== Phylogeny ==
A 2021 study confirmed that the superfamily is monophyletic. Additionally, it found that Sphaeroceroidea is the sister group to all other Schizophora except for Sciomyzoidea (including Lauxanioidea and Conopoidea).
