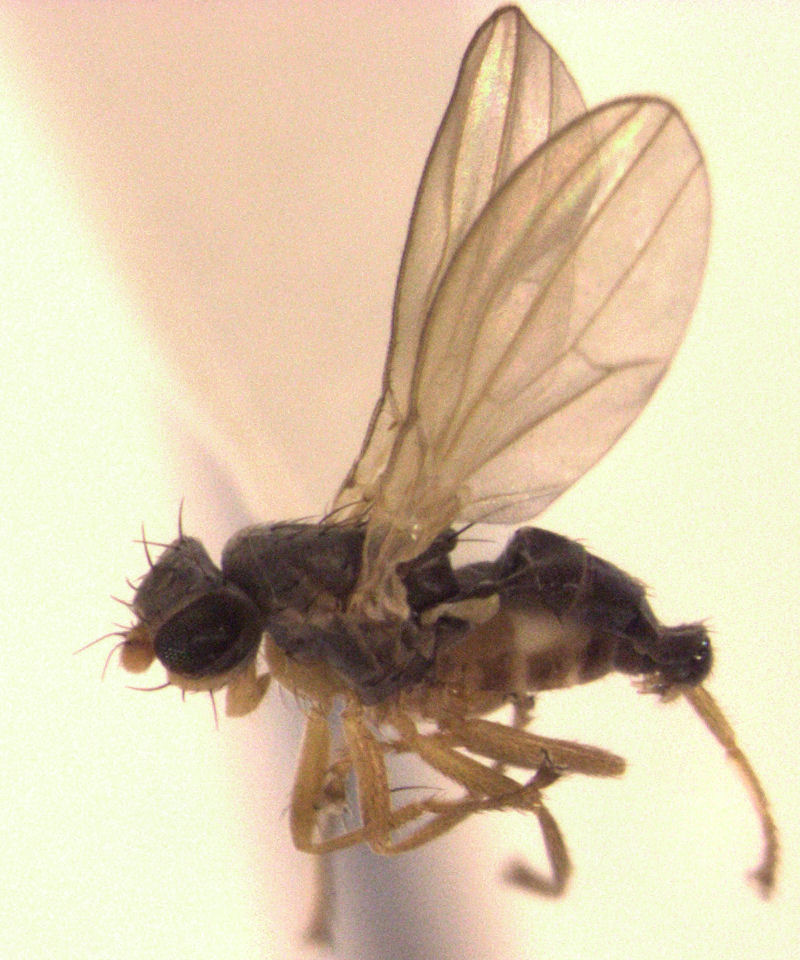
- Male Australimyza australensis

Scientific classification
- Domain: Eukaryota
- Kingdom: Animalia
- Phylum: Arthropoda
- Class: Insecta
- Order: Diptera
- Superfamily: Carnoidea
- Family: Australimyzidae; Griffiths, 1972

Genera
- Australimyza Harrison, 1959

= Australimyzidae =

Family of flies

Australimyzidae is a family of flies (Diptera). There is 1 genus, containing 9 known species known from Australia and New Zealand and subantarctic surrounding islands. They have saprophagous larvae.

== Species ==
- Australimyza
  - A. australensis (Mik, 1881)
  - A. glandulifera Brake & Mathis, 2007
  - A. kaikoura Brake & Mathis, 2007
  - A. longiseta Harrison, 1959
  - A. macquariensis (Womersley, 1937)
  - A. mcalpinei Brake & Mathis, 2007
  - A. salicorniae Harrison, 1959
  - A. setigera Harrison, 1959
  - A. victoria Brake & Mathis, 2007
