= Cypselosomatidae =

Scientific classification
- Domain: Eukaryota
- Kingdom: Animalia
- Phylum: Arthropoda
- Class: Insecta
- Order: Diptera
- Superfamily: Nerioidea
- Family: Cypselosomatidae; Hendel, 1931

Genera
- Clisa McAlpine, 1993; Cypselosoma Hendel, 1913; †Cypselosomatites Hennig, 1965; Formicosepsis de Meigere, 1916

Family of flies

The Cypselosomatidae are a family of true flies (Diptera) closely related to the Micropezidae. Some species are believed to be associated with bat guano.

== Distribution ==
They occur worldwide, including Australia.
