= Neminidae =

Scientific classification
- Domain: Eukaryota
- Kingdom: Animalia
- Phylum: Arthropoda
- Class: Insecta
- Order: Diptera
- Superfamily: Opomyzoidea
- Family: Neminidae

Family of flies

Neminidae is a family of flies belonging to the order Diptera.

Genera:

- Nemo McAlpine, 1983
- Nemula Freidberg, 1994
- Ningulus McAlpine, 1983
