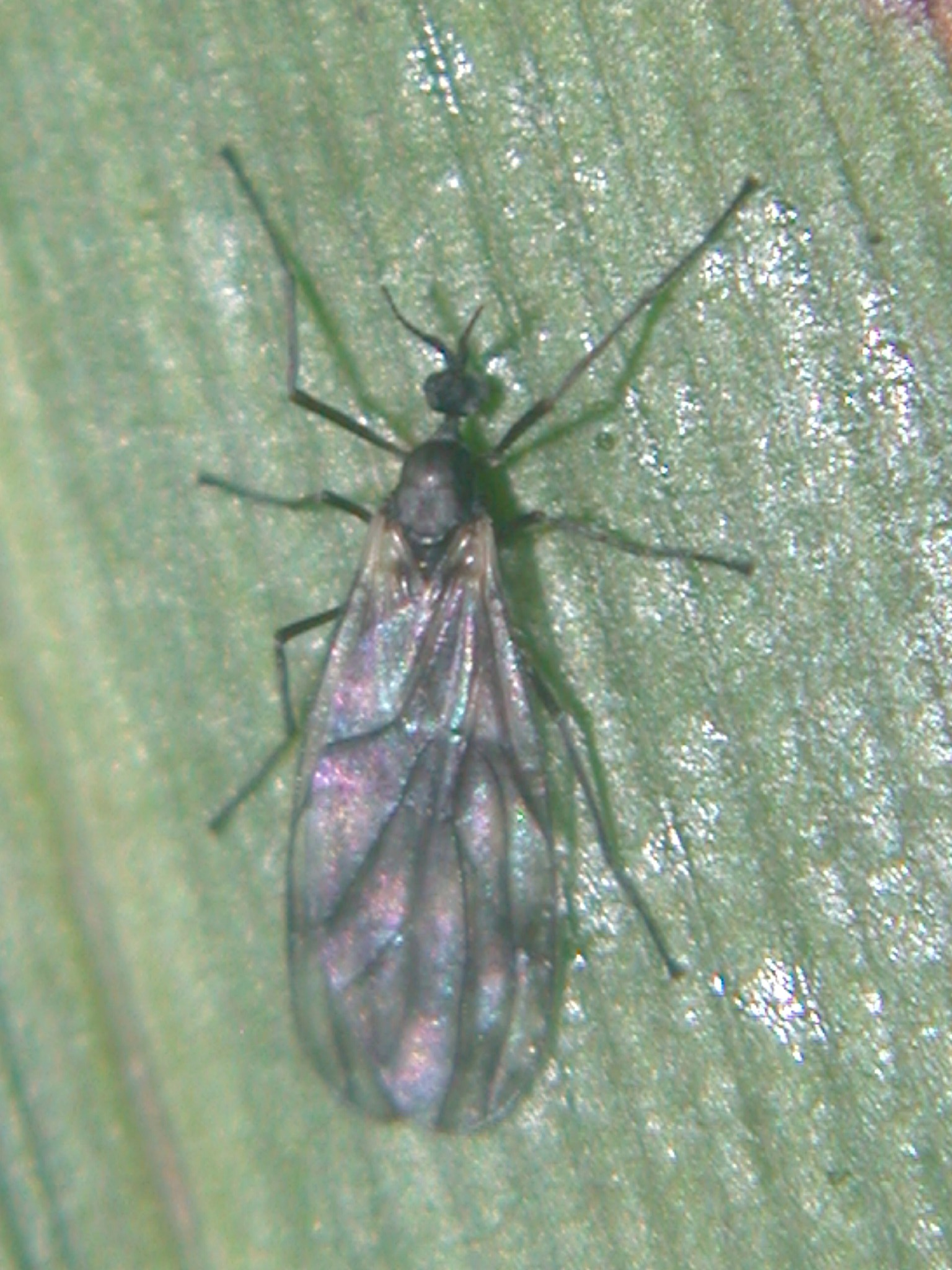
- Perissomma mcalpinei

Scientific classification
- Kingdom: Animalia
- Phylum: Arthropoda
- Class: Insecta
- Order: Diptera
- Suborder: Nematocera
- Infraorder: Perissommatomorpha
- Family: Perissommatidae; Colless, 1962

Genera
- Perissomma; †Palaeoperissomma; †Perissordes; †Collessomma; †Gurvaniella; †Limnorhyphus

= Perissommatidae =

Perissommatidae Temporal range: Middle Jurassic–Recent

Family of flies

The Perissommatidae are a family of flies (Diptera) that was proposed in 1962 by Donald Henry Colless based on the species Perissomma fusca from Australia. The family now includes five extant species within the single genus Perissomma, four from Australia and one from Chile. The Perissommatidae are unusual as they appear to have four compound eyes. They have a small slender body less than 2 millimetres (0.079 in) in length. Their wings are large in comparison to their bodies and subsequently their flight is weak. Preferring high-altitude forest environments, adults only fly in the winter. The larvae live in decaying leaf litter in wet sclerophyll or cool rain forests. Some species are suspected to be associated with fungi. In the case of Perissomma macalpinei, numbers of adults have been observed congregating in clumps of foliage and rising in short, zigzag flights in the sunlight above the foliage for short periods before descending.

Fossils of the family are known from the Middle Jurassic to Early Cretaceous of Eastern and Northern Asia.

== Extinct genera ==
After

- †Limnorhyphus Hong 1983, Haifanggou Formation, China, Middle Jurassic (Callovian)
- Subfamily Perissommatinae Colless 1962
  - †Collessomma Lukashevich and Blagoderov 2020 Khasurty locality, Russia, Dzun-Bain Formation, Mongolia, Early Cretaceous (Aptian)
  - †Gurvaniella Kovalev 1986 Gurvan-Eren Formation, Mongolia, Aptian
  - †Palaeoperissomma Kovalev 1985 Itat Formation, Russia, Middle Jurassic (Bathonian), Shar Teeg, Mongolia, Late Jurassic (Tithonian) Turga Formation, Russia, Aptian
- †subfamily Rasnicynommatinae Lukashevich 2011
  - †Rasnicynomma Lukashevich 2011 Shar Teeg, Mongolia, Tithonian
- †subfamily Perissordinae Lukashevich et al. 2006
  - †Perissordes Lukashevich et al. 2006 Daohugou, China, Callovian
