= Margo (fly) =

Scientific classification
- Domain: Eukaryota
- Kingdom: Animalia
- Phylum: Arthropoda
- Class: Insecta
- Order: Diptera
- Family: Marginidae
- Genus: Margo; McAlpine, 1991

Genus of flies

Margo is the sole genus of flies placed in the family Marginidae and referred to as margin flies. The genus comprises two species, both from Africa: Margo aperta from Zimbabwe and Margo clausa from Madagascar. They are restricted to dense moist forests and are thought to be endangered by habitat destruction. Very little is known of their distribution or biology. The family Marginidae is provisionally placed, on the basis of morphological characters, in the superfamily Opomyzoidea.
