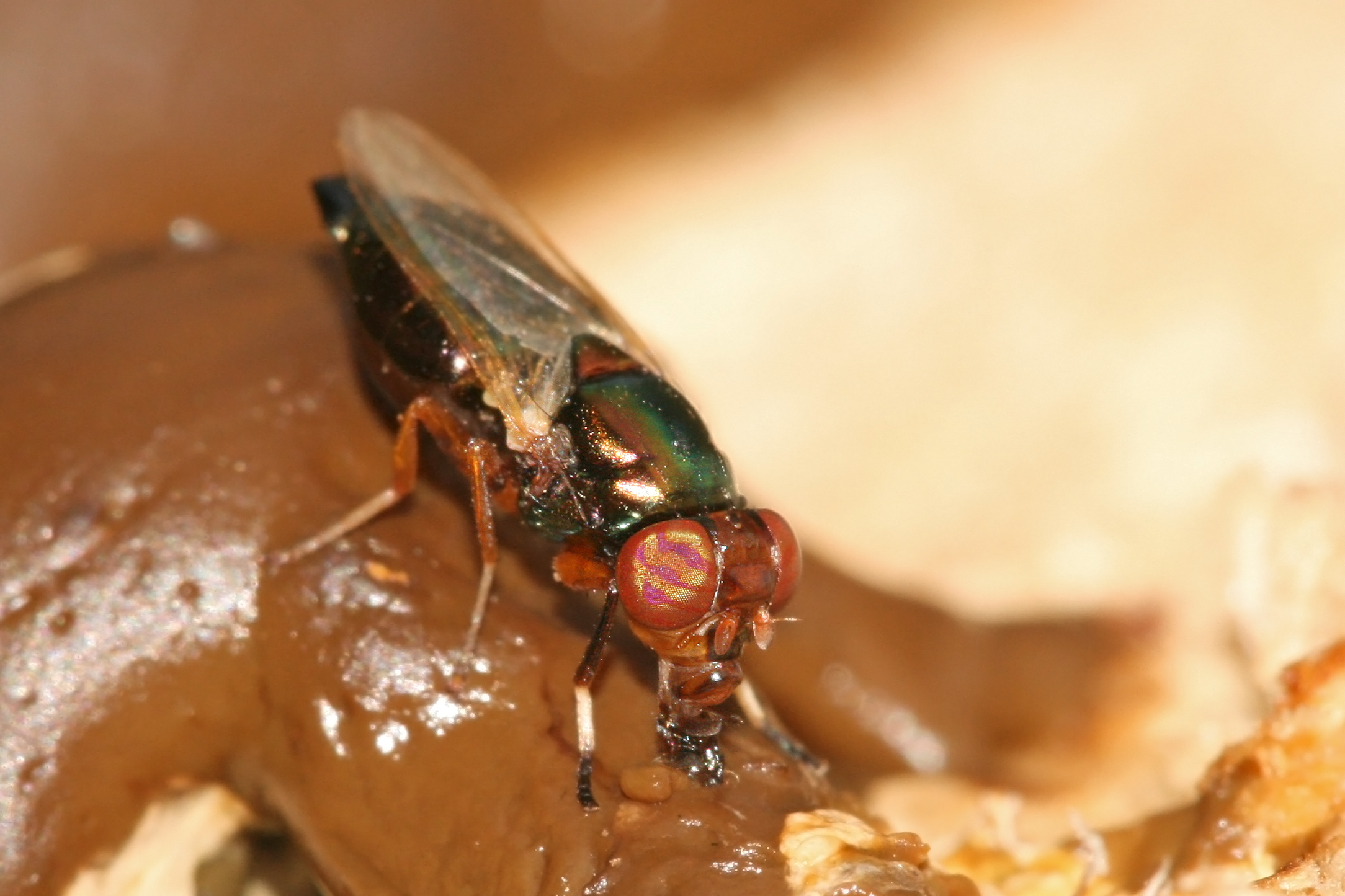
- Female Physiphora alceae

Scientific classification
- Kingdom: Animalia
- Phylum: Arthropoda
- Clade: Pancrustacea
- Class: Insecta
- Order: Diptera
- Subsection: Acalyptratae
- Superfamily: Tephritoidea

Families
- see text

= Tephritoidea =

Superfamily of flies

The Tephritoidea are a superfamily of flies. It has over 7,800 species, the majority of them in family Tephritidae.

The following families are included:

- Ctenostylidae
- Eurygnathomyiidae
- Lonchaeidae - lance flies
- Pallopteridae — flutter flies
- Piophilidae — skippers
- Platystomatidae — signal flies
- Pyrgotidae
- Richardiidae
- Tephritidae — fruit flies
- Ulidiidae (Otitidae) — picture-winged flies

The Tachiniscinae, formerly ranked as the family Tachiniscidae, are now included in the Tephritidae.

== Description ==
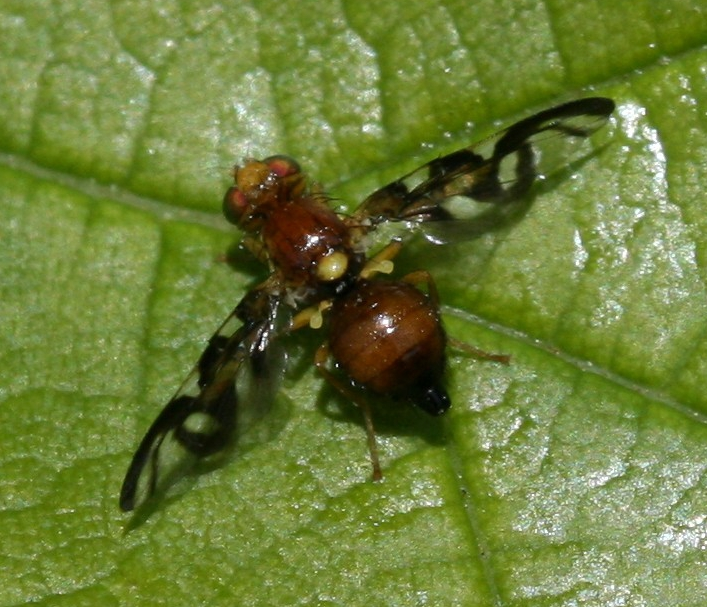
Euleia heraclei (Tephritidae), showing the patterned wings

Tephritoidea are generally rather hairy flies with setae weakly differentiated. They have the following synapomorphies: male tergum 6 strongly reduced or absent; surstylus or medial surstylus with toothlike prensisetae (in Piophilidae only in one genus); female sterna 4-6 with anterior rodlike apodemes; female tergosternum 7 consisting of two portions, the anterior forming a tubular oviscape and the posterior consisting of two pairs of longitudinal taeniae.

In most Tephritoidea, the anal cell of a wing has a characteristic shape: the anal crossvein is indented while the cell's outer posterior angle is produced into an acute lobe. The exceptions to this rule are Platystomatidae and some Tephritidae, Ulidiidae (=Otitidae), and Pyrgotidae.

Many tephritoid families have spots or patterns on their wings. These are Pallopteridae, Platystomatidae, Pyrgotidae, Richardiidae, Tephritidae and Ulidiidae.

== Ecology ==
Tephritoidea includes plant pests in the families Tephritidae, Lonchaeidae and Ulidiidae. In these pest species, adult females lay their eggs on plant tissues, which hatch into larvae that begin feeding. However, Tephritoidea also includes parasitoids (Ctenostylidae, Pyrgotidae and the tephritid subfamily Tachiniscinae) and saprophages that feed on decaying plants (subfamily Phytalmiinae and some Lonchaeidae).

== Phylogeny ==
Tephritoidea is a monophyletic superfamily that can be divided into two also-monophyletic groups: the Piophilidae Family Group (Pallopteridae, Circumphallidae, Lonchaeidae, Piophilidae and Eurygnathomyiidae) and the Tephritidae Family Group (Richardiidae, Ulidiidae, Platystomatidae, Tephritidae, Ctenostylidae and Pyrgotidae).

== Evolution ==
The first Tephritoidea are believed to have evolved in the mid-Paleocene, approximately 59 million years ago.
