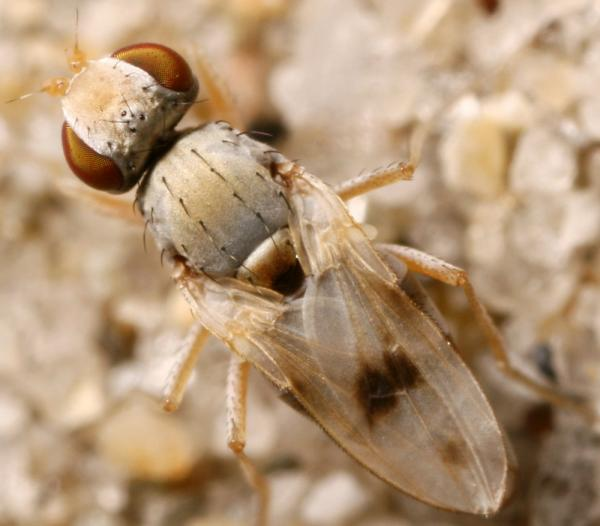
- Tethina lusitanica from family Canacidae

Scientific classification
- Kingdom: Animalia
- Phylum: Arthropoda
- Clade: Pancrustacea
- Class: Insecta
- Order: Diptera
- Section: Schizophora
- Subsection: Acalyptratae
- Superfamily: Carnoidea

Families
- Acartophthalmidae; Australimyzidae; Braulidae - bee lice; Canacidae - beach flies; Carnidae; Chloropidae - frit flies; Inbiomyiidae; Milichiidae

= Carnoidea =

Superfamily of flies

Carnoidea is a superfamily of Acalyptratae flies.

== Description ==
In general, member of Carnoidea are small flies no more than a few millimetres long.

Carnoidea is a poorly defined superfamily. In 1989, ten synapomorphies were described for the group, but most of these have later been challenged. As of 2006, the following synapomorphies were described: uppermost fronto-orbital bristle(s) of the head is exclinate; phallus of the male is flexible, unsclerotized, simple and elongate; and phallus is microtrichose.

== Ecology ==
Braulidae are associated with honey bees, with larvae developing in beeswax while adults attach to bees and feed from bee mouthparts.

Canacidae adults are mainly found on seashore habitats such as beaches, estuarine tidal flats, wave-swept rocks and mangroves. Little is known about their larvae, but they are believed to mainly feed on algae in the intertidal zone. Australimyzidae are also found on seashores, being associated with dead or decaying plant matter.

Carnidae are scavengers found in various kinds of plant matter, animal dung, carrion and vertebrate nests. Milichiidae are also scavengers and most occur in a range of habitats, though some are restricted to ant nests, bee nests or bat dung in caves.

Chloropidae are more varied in their larval ecology, including scavengers, herbivores in plant shoots and stems (these may be largely bacterial feeders), parasites feeding on frog blood, and predators of insect or spider eggs.

Adults of Inbiomyiidae are believed to be microbial grazers, as dissections have found fungal, algal and probably bacterial material in their guts. The larvae are unknown.

== Phylogeny ==
Australimyzidae and Inbiomyiidae are sister groups, meaning they are more closely related to each other than to any other family.

Carnoidea may not be a monophyletic group. One molecular analysis found that its constituent families are more closely related to members of other superfamilies, such as Braulidae to Drosophilidae (superfamily Ephydroidea).
