= Xenasteiidae =

Scientific classification
- Domain: Eukaryota
- Kingdom: Animalia
- Phylum: Arthropoda
- Class: Insecta
- Order: Diptera
- (unranked): Cyclorrhapha
- Section: Schizophora
- Subsection: Acalyptratae
- Superfamily: Opomyzoidea
- Family: Xenasteiidae; Hardy, 1980

Type species
- Xenasteia sabroskyi

Family of flies

Xenasteiidae is a family of flies. The flies are smaller than 2 mm long and are identified by the wing venation. The wings have two breaks in the costal vein and M1 is reduced becoming thinner in the medial region and not reaching the wing margin. The alula is well developed with a long fringe.
