= Canthyloscelidae =

Canthyloscelidae Temporal range: Middle Jurassic–Recent

Scientific classification
- Kingdom: Animalia
- Phylum: Arthropoda
- Clade: Pancrustacea
- Class: Insecta
- Order: Diptera
- Suborder: Nematocera
- Infraorder: Bibionomorpha
- Superfamily: Scatopsoidea
- Family: Canthyloscelidae; Enderlein, 1912

Subfamilies
- Canthyloscelinae

Synonyms
- Canthyloscelididae; Hyperoscelididae; Synneuridae

Family of flies

The Canthyloscelidae are a small family of midges closely related to the Scatopsidae.

Adults are small to medium-sized (2.5-9.0 mm) flies, relatively stout, usually dark coloured Nematocera with stout legs. They are associated with ancient woodland. Larvae are xylosaprophagous and live in the moist, rotting wood of stumps and fallen trees.

Most are considered endangered due to the vulnerability of their habitat.

Fifteen described species live in New Zealand, North America, South America, Japan and Russia, and one is known from the Jurassic fossil record.

== Systematics ==
Originally considered to be two separate families, the Synneuridae and the Canthyloscelidae. Haenni placed the Synneuridae as the subfamily Synneurinae. A phylogenetic reclassification by Amorim has reduced the Synneurinae into a synonymy of Canthyloscelinae.

- Genus Canthyloscelis Edwards, 1922
  - Canthyloscelis antennata Edwards, 1922
  - Canthyloscelis apicata Edwards, 1934
  - Canthyloscelis balaena Hutson, 1977
  - Canthyloscelis brevicornis Nagatomi, 1983
  - Canthyloscelis claripennis Edwards, 1922
  - Canthyloscelis nigricoxa Edwards, 1922
  - Canthyloscelis pectinata Edwards, 1930
  - Canthyloscelis pectipennis Edwards, 1930
  - Canthyloscelis valdiviana Tollet, 1959
- Genus Exiliscelis Hutson 1977
  - Exiliscelis californiensis Hutson, 1977
- Genus Hyperoscelis Hardy & Nagatomi 1960
  - Hyperoscelis eximia (Boheman, 1858)
  - Hyperoscelis veternosa Mamaev & Krivosheina, 1969
- Genus † Prohyperoscelis Kovalev 1985 Itat Formation, Russia, Bathonian
  - Prohyperoscelis jurassicus † Kovalev, 1985
- Genus Synneuron Lundström 1910
  - Synneuron annulipes Lundström, 1910
  - Synneuron decipens Hutson, 1977
  - Synneuron sylvestre Mamaev & Krivosheina, 1969
  - †Synneuron eomontana Amorim & Greenwalt, 2020
  - †Synneuron jelli Amorim & Greenwalt, 2020
