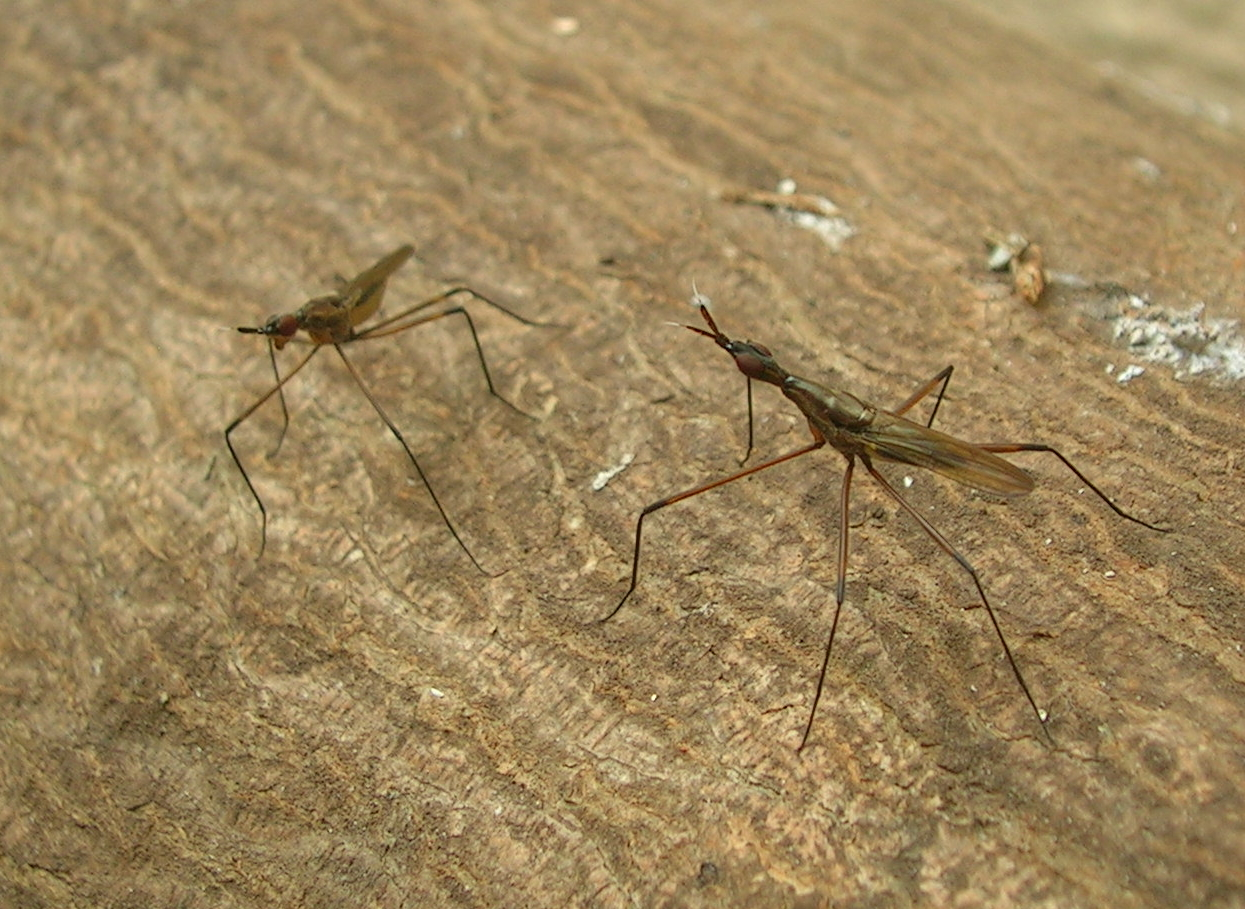
- Telostylinus lineolatus from India

Scientific classification
- Kingdom: Animalia
- Phylum: Arthropoda
- Class: Insecta
- Order: Diptera
- Section: Schizophora
- Subsection: Acalyptratae
- Superfamily: Nerioidea

Families
- Cypselosomatidae; Fergusoninidae; Micropezidae - stilt-legged flies Neriidae - cactus flies Pseudopomyzidae; Strongylophthalmyiidae; Tanypezidae

= Nerioidea =

Superfamily of flies

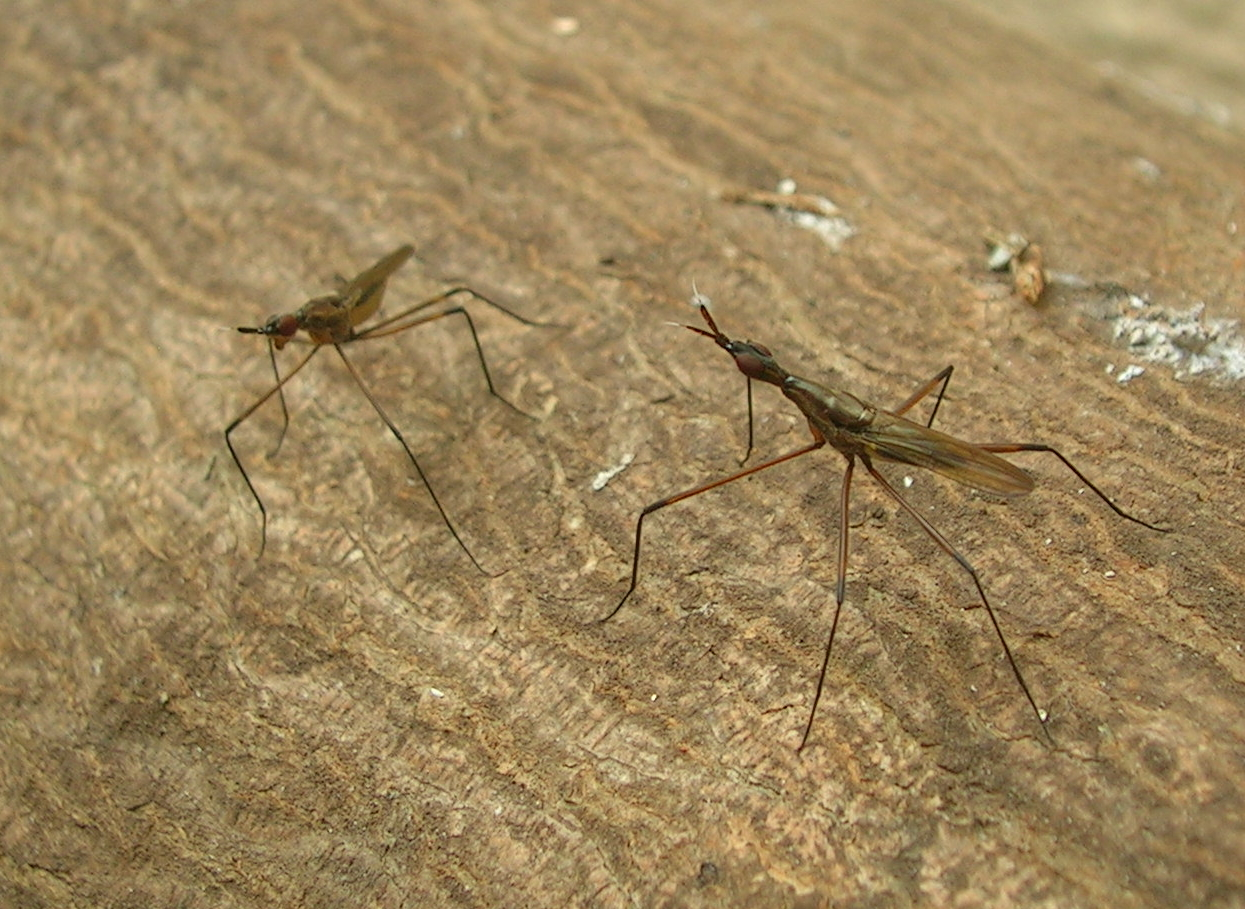
Telostylinus lineolatus

Nerioidea is a superfamily of Acalyptratae flies.

== Description ==
As flies, Nerioidea undergo complete metamorphosis with the four life stages of egg, larva, pupa and adult. The adult stage has three body segments (head, thorax and abdomen), three pairs of legs and one pair of wings.

Some features that distinguish adult Nerioidea from other flies are: a face that's usually weakly sclerotised (except in Fergusoninidae), antenna usually porrect or slightly deflexed (elbowed in Tanypezidae), wing veins R2+3 and R4+5 usually convergent, and the wing anal cell usually much smaller than the subcostal cell.

== Ecology ==
Most Nerioidea are associated with dead and decaying organic matter such as dead wood, rotting fruit and bat dung. On the other hand, Fergusoninidae form galls in plants of family Myrtaceae, and some Micropezidae have larvae that are predatory or agricultural pests.

== Notable species ==
- Glyphidops flavifrons - can be found in the Nearctic and Neotropical regions
