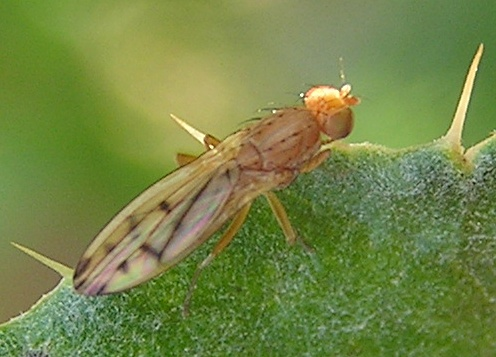
- Opomyza florum

Scientific classification
- Kingdom: Animalia
- Phylum: Arthropoda
- Class: Insecta
- Order: Diptera
- Subsection: Acalyptratae
- Superfamily: Opomyzoidea

Families
- Agromyzidae -leaf miner flies; Anthomyzidae; Asteiidae; Aulacigastridae - sap flies; Clusiidae - lekking flies; Fergusoninidae; Marginidae; Neminidae; Neurochaetidae- upside-down flies; Odiniidae; Opomyzidae; Periscelididae; Teratomyzidae; Xenasteiidae

= Opomyzoidea =

Leaf-miner flies, etc.

Superfamily of flies

The Opomyzoidea are a superfamily of flies.

== Biology ==
Opomyzoids show a range of lifestyles including mining plant leaves (many Agromyzidae), feeding in grass stems (Anthomyzidae and Opomyzidae), forming plant galls (Fergusonina), feeding on fungi (some Anthomyzidae and Asteiidae), feeding on sap flows of trees (some Aulacigastridae, Odiniidae and Periscelididae), living in galleries of wood-boring insects (Odiniidae) or in water-filled cavities of plants (phytotelmata; Aulacigastridae, Neurochaetidae and Periscelididae). However, the biology of most opomyzoid families is poorly known.

== Phylogeny ==
The phylogeny of Opomyzoidea is controversial, with different authors assigning different families and different relationships among families. One study using molecular analysis concluded that the superfamily is not monophyletic.
