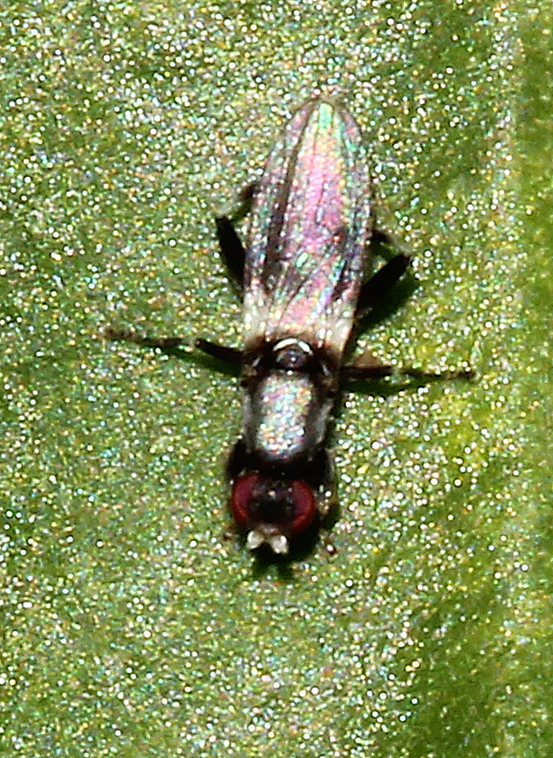
- Neurochaeta inversa, a species of upside-down fly.

Scientific classification
- Kingdom: Animalia
- Phylum: Arthropoda
- Class: Insecta
- Order: Diptera
- Superfamily: Opomyzoidea
- Family: Neurochaetidae; McAlpine, 1978

= Neurochaetidae =

Family of flies

Neurochaetidae is a family of flies belonging to the order Diptera. These flies are also known as upside-down flies because they maintain a "head downwards" orientation while walking on vertical or steeply sloped surfaces. Neurochaetids date back to the Eocene–Oligocene boundary, with fossils of the extinct genus Anthoclusia in Baltic amber described by Willi Hennig, and the extant genera are native to the Old World tropics and subtropics.

Neurochaeta is the type genus for Neurochaetidae, and Neurochaeta inversa is the type species for Neurochaeta.

Genera:

- Anthoclusia Hennig, 1965
- Neurochaeta McAlpine, 1978
- Neurocytta McAlpine, 1988
- Neurotexis McAlpine, 1988
- Nothoasteia Malloch, 1936
