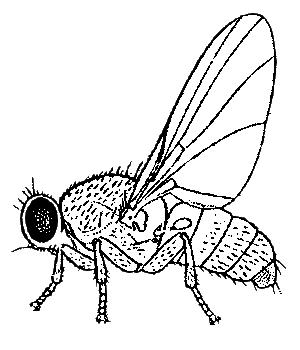
- Outline

Scientific classification
- Kingdom: Animalia
- Phylum: Arthropoda
- Clade: Pancrustacea
- Class: Insecta
- Order: Diptera
- Superfamily: Opomyzoidea
- Family: Fergusoninidae; Hennig, 1958
- Genus: Fergusonina; Malloch, 1924

Type species
- Fergusonina microcera Malloch, 1924

= Fergusonina =

Genus of flies

Fergusonina, the sole genus in the family of Fergusoninidae, are gall-forming flies. There are about 40 species in the genus, all of them producing galls on Eucalyptus, Melaleuca, Corymbia, and Metrosideros species (all in the family Myrtaceae) in Australia and New Zealand.

These flies are small and their larvae grow within galls formed on the leaf, shoot or flower buds. The galls themselves are induced by endosymbiotic nematodes in the genus Fergusobia (family Neotylenchidae) which are obligate mutualists of the flies. Females carry the nematode in their haemocoel, and transport them to host plants while laying their eggs. Most of the fly species are specific to their tree hosts but a few use more than one species of host.

The taxonomic placement of Fergusoninidae is disputed. While formerly in the superfamily Opomyzoidea, a 2020 study places it within superfamily Nerioidea based on morphology, while a 2021 study using transcriptome data places it in a group along with Agromyzidae and other families

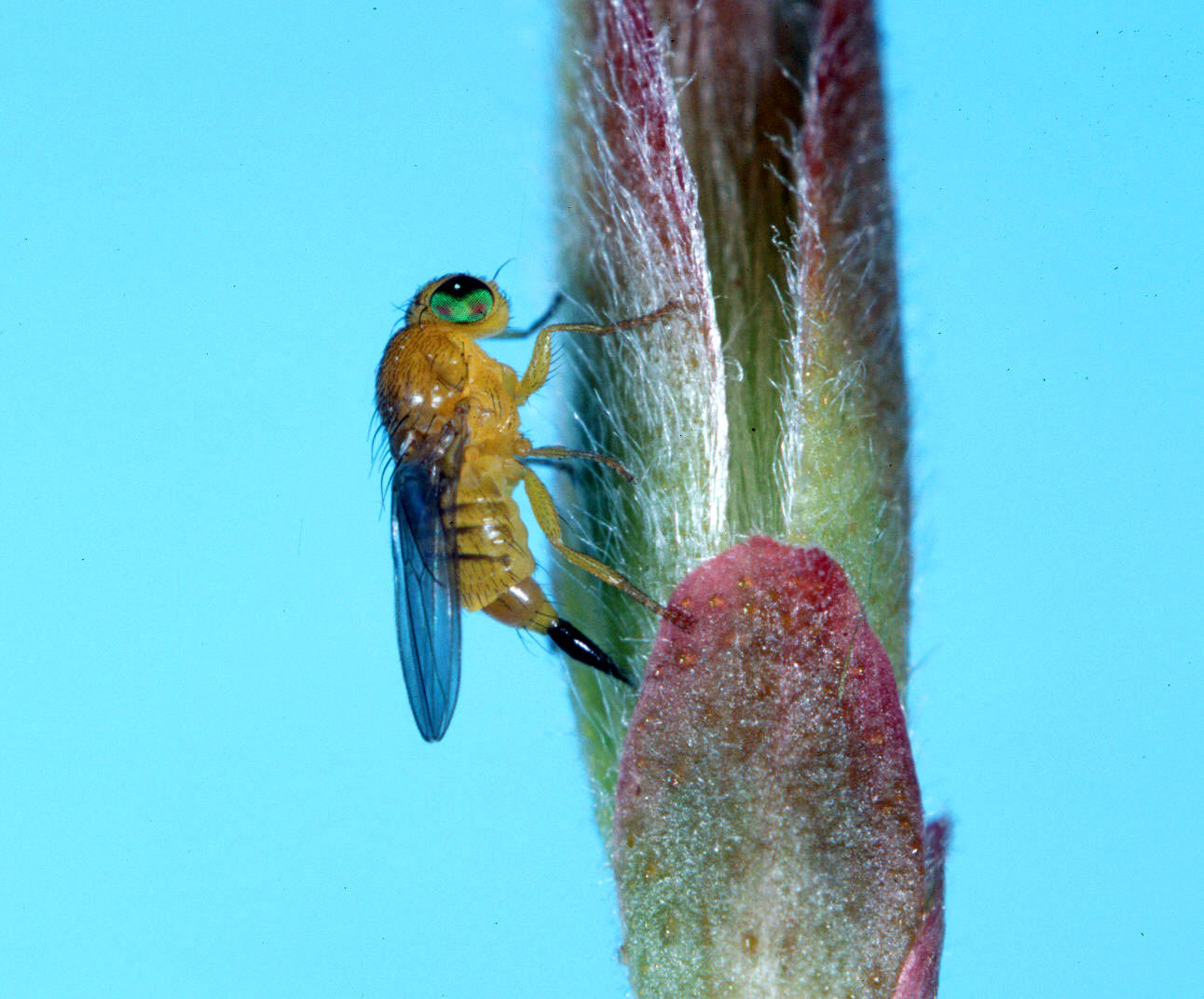
A Fergusonina species
