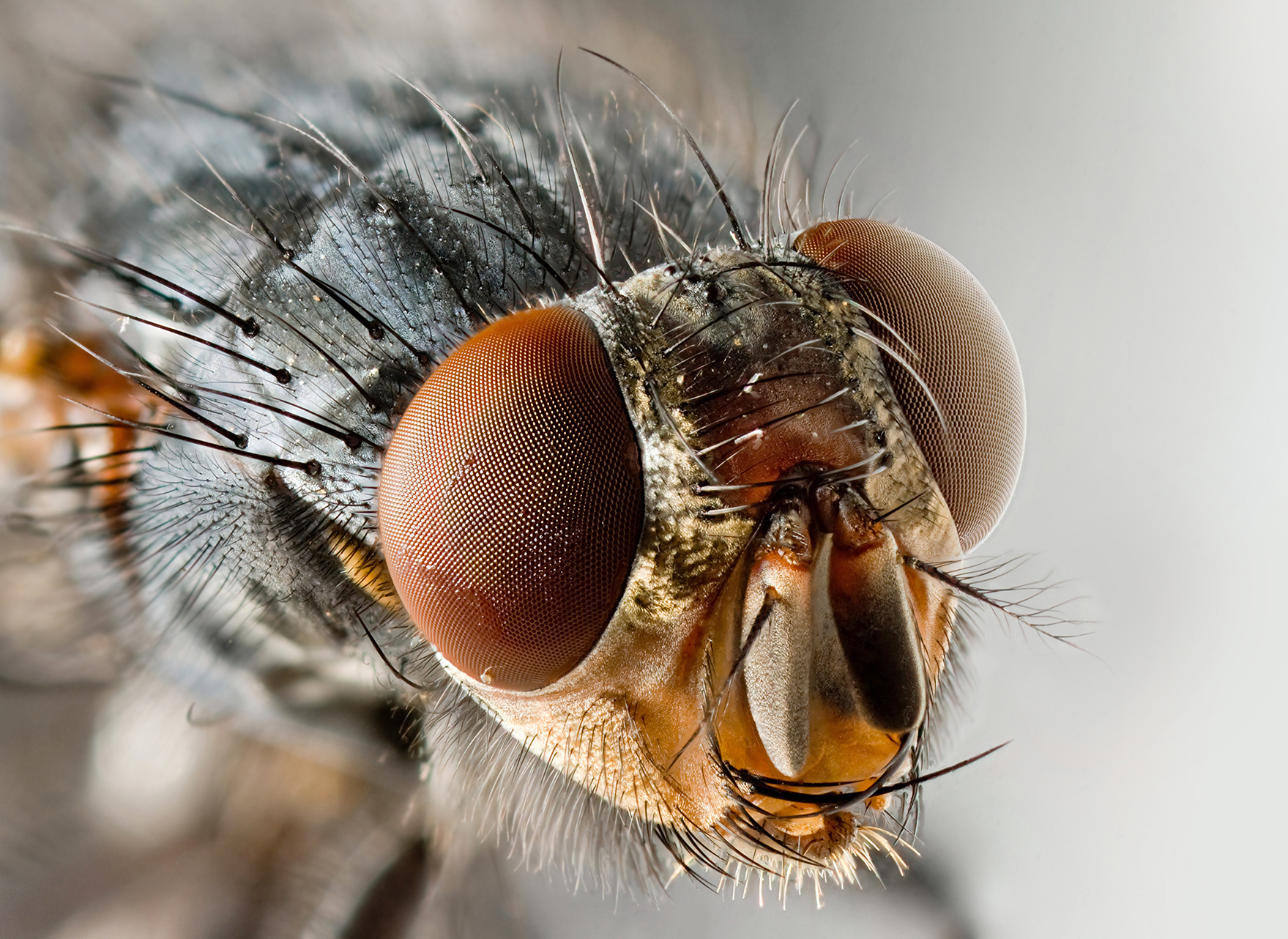
- Musca domestica

Scientific classification
- Kingdom: Animalia
- Phylum: Arthropoda
- Class: Insecta
- Order: Diptera
- Suborder: Brachycera
- Infraorder: Muscomorpha
- Clade: Eremoneura
- (unranked): Cyclorrhapha

Sections
- Schizophora

= Cyclorrhapha =

Group of flies

Cyclorrhapha is an unranked taxon within the infraorder Muscomorpha. They are called "Cyclorrhapha" ('circular-seamed flies') with reference to the circular aperture through which the adult escapes the puparium. This is a circumscriptional name that has significant historical familiarity, but in the present classification, this name is synonymous with the more recent "Muscomorpha".

Cyclorrhapha underwent major adaptive radiation that led to over 72,000 extant species. These species share multiple attributes such as the 360-degree rotation of the male terminalia.

Cyclorrhapha exhibits significant morphological and molecular diversity, including notable changes in anterior egg development, as exemplified by the role of the exuperantia (exu) gene in Anastrepha fraterculus, a species of great agricultural importance. Additionally, phylogenetic analyses suggest that the larval structures of Cyclorrhapha have evolved in response to varying food consistencies, reflecting their ecological adaptations.
