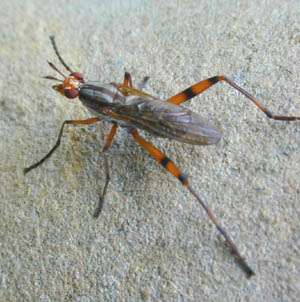
- Marsh fly (Sciomyzidae)

Scientific classification
- Kingdom: Animalia
- Phylum: Arthropoda
- Class: Insecta
- Order: Diptera
- Suborder: Brachycera
- Infraorder: Muscomorpha
- Clade: Eremoneura
- (unranked): Cyclorrhapha
- Section: Schizophora; Becher, 1882

Subsections
- Acalyptratae; Calyptratae

= Schizophora =

Schizophora Temporal range: Paleogene–Present

Group of flies

The Schizophora are a section of true flies containing 78 families, which are collectively referred to as muscoids, although technically the term "muscoid" should be limited to flies in the superfamily Muscoidea; this is an example of informal, historical usage persisting in the vernacular. The section is divided into two subsections, the Acalyptratae and Calyptratae, which are commonly referred to as acalyptrate muscoids and calyptrate muscoids, respectively.

The defining feature of the Schizophora is the presence of a special structure used to help the emerging adult fly break free of the puparium; this structure is an inflatable membranous sac called the ptilinum that protrudes from the face, above the antennae. The inflation of the ptilinum (using fluid hemolymph rather than air) creates pressure along the line of weakness in the puparium, which then bursts open along the seam to allow the adult to escape. When the adult emerges, the fluid is withdrawn, the ptilinum collapses, and the membrane retracts entirely back inside the head. The large, inverted, U-shaped suture in the face through which it came, however, is still quite visible, and the name "Schizophora" ("split-bearers") is derived from this ptilinal or frontal suture. The term was first used by Eduard Becher.

In contrast to eggs of other arthropods, most insect eggs are drought-resistant, because inside the maternal chorion, two additional membranes develop from embryonic tissue, the amnion and the serosa. This serosa secretes a cuticle rich in chitin that protects the embryo against desiccation. In the Schizophora, however, the serosa does not develop, but these flies lay their eggs in damp places, such as rotting organic matter.

The absence of schizophoran flies from Cretaceous rocks implies that they likely rapidly diversified during the Cenozoic, with the first appearance of the group during the early Paleogene, around 53 million years ago, with it being estimated that they split off from other flies around 66-65 million years ago.
