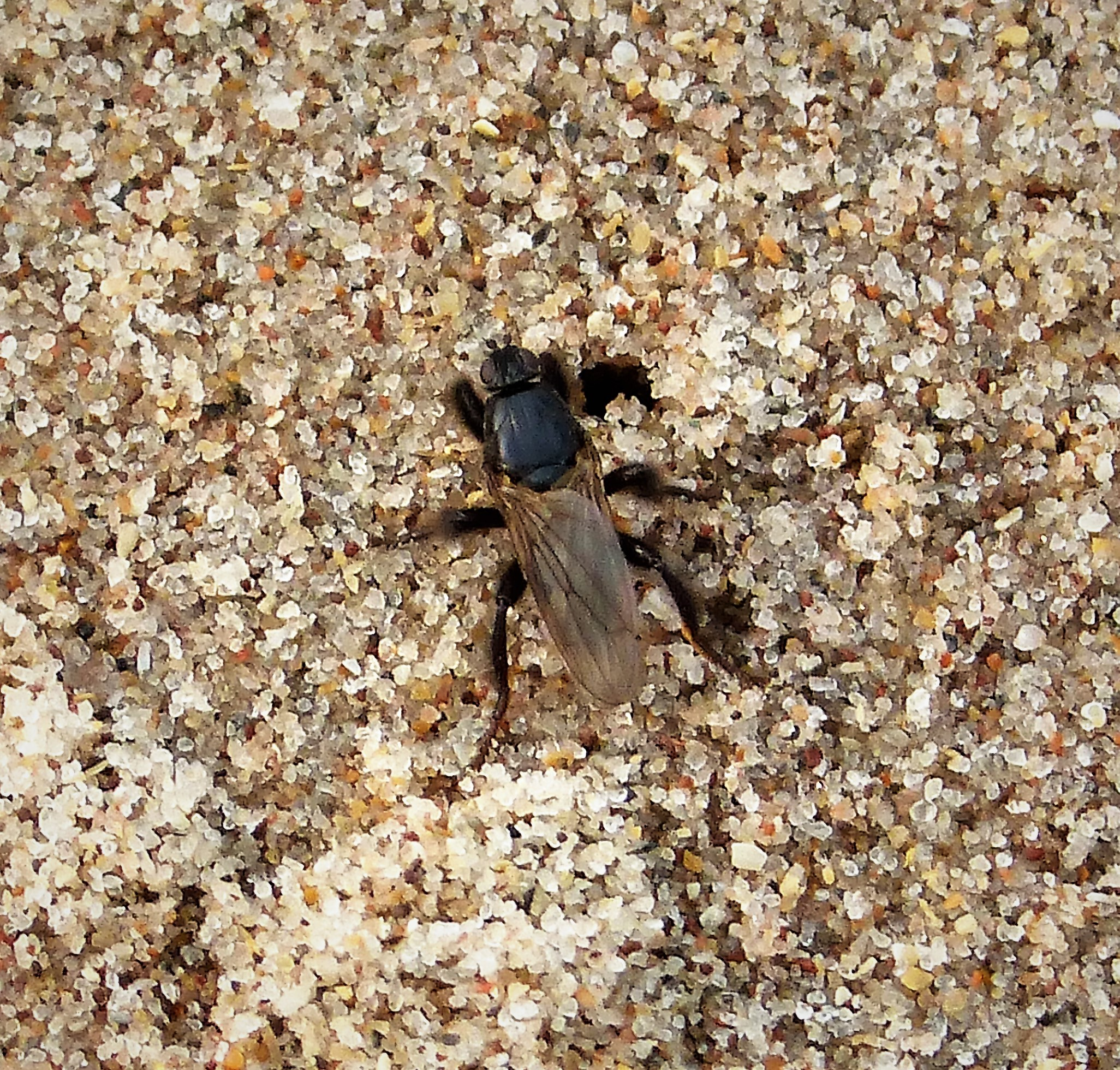
- Adult

Scientific classification
- Kingdom: Animalia
- Phylum: Arthropoda
- Class: Insecta
- Order: Diptera
- Family: Coelopidae
- Subfamily: Coelopinae
- Tribe: Coelopini
- Genus: Coelopa
- Species: C. pilipes

Binomial name
- Coelopa pilipes Haliday, 1838
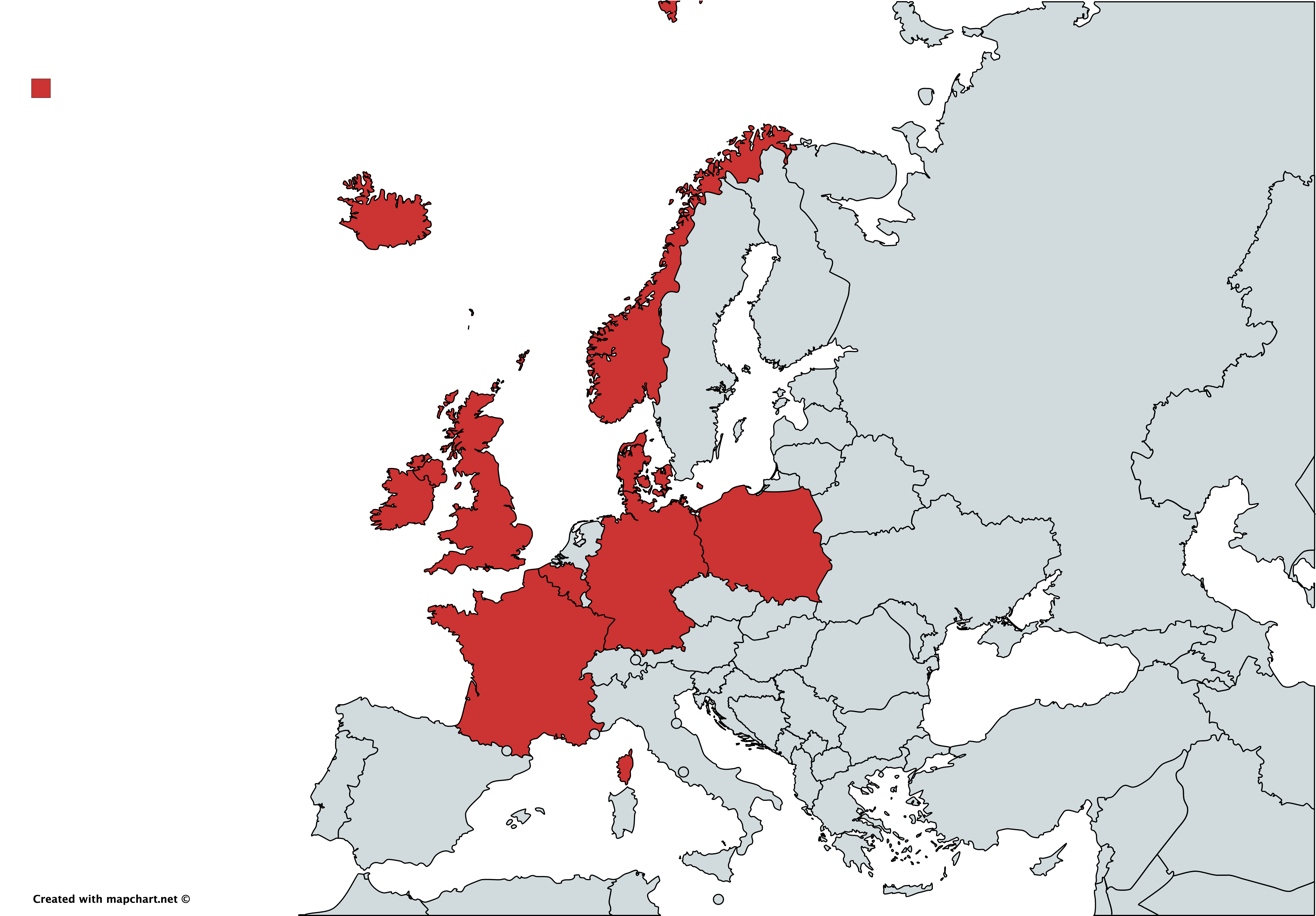
- Map of the native distribution of C. pilipes in Europe

Synonyms
- Coelopa brevipilosa Mercier, 1921; Coelopa marina Walker, 1849

= Coelopa pilipes =

Species of fly

Coelopa pilipes (common name kelp fly or seaweed fly) is a common European species of kelp fly. It was described by A. H. Haliday in 1838. Their appearance differs greatly from that of other Coelopa flies.

C. pilipes are especially prevalent in European beaches. Year-round, these flies live in washed-up kelp on wrack zones of beaches before adulthood and consume the decaying kelp, mostly of the genera Laminaria and Fucus that have a great impact on the flies' survival. Female flies lay eggs in the decaying seaweed, and larvae mature in the warm, moist environment it provides. C. pilipes has significant sympatry with C. frigida; the two flies are often studied together due to their overlapping habitats and distribution.

== Morphology ==
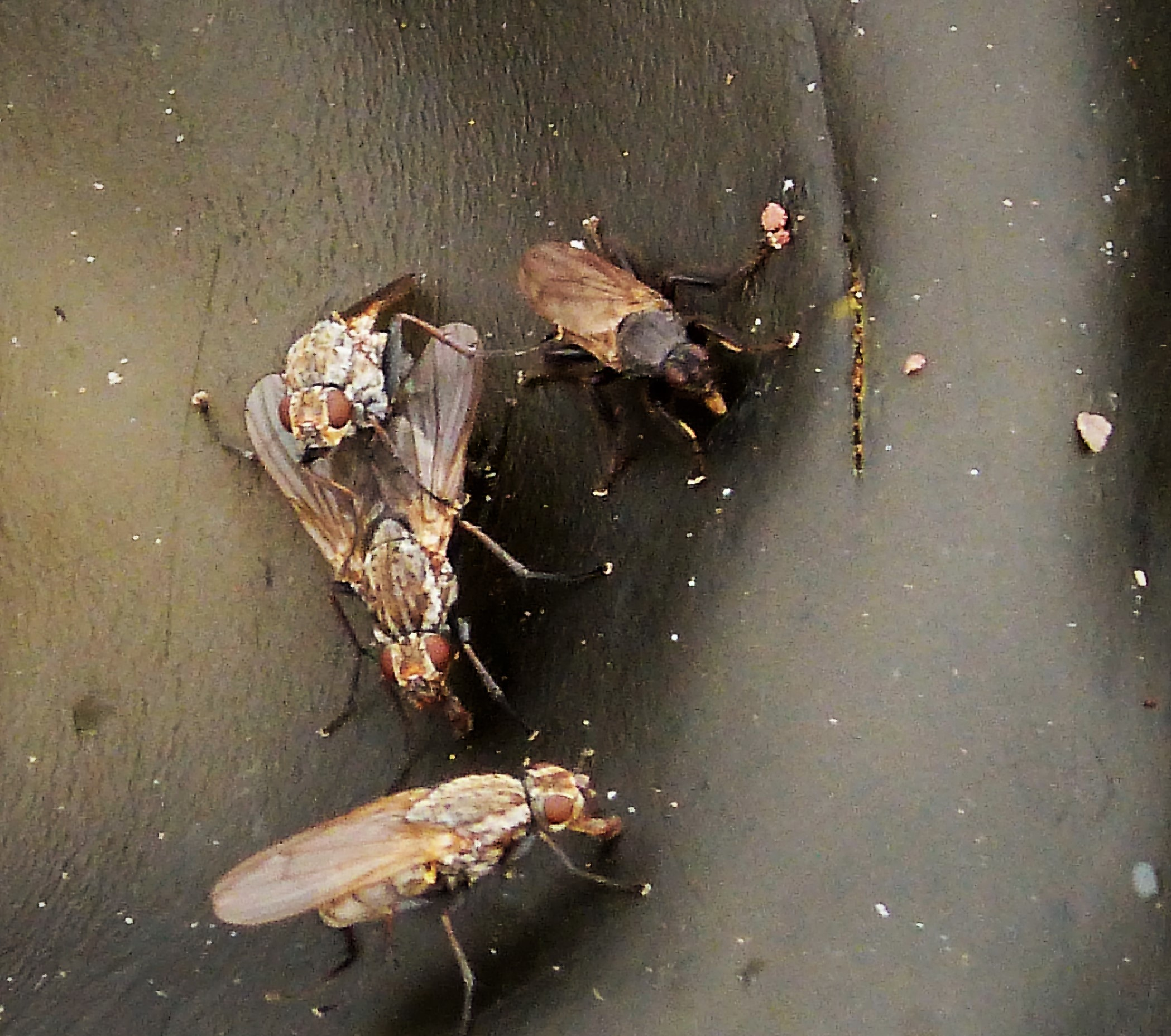
Anthomiidae and Coelopa pilipes (darker in color)

In general, seaweed flies are dark-colored, small or medium-sized flies with hairs or bristles. Darker color makes the adults more distinguishable from other species, but larvae are less easily identified. Adults have small eyes and short antennae and legs, and their bodies tend to be more flattened than other species.

Environment, genetic factors, and nutrition contribute to variable measurements such as wing size. In order to adapt to wet seaside environments, C. pilipes larvae have hair on their posterior parts and spines on their ventral surfaces, as seen in many species that dwell in damp seaweed.

Coelopa pilipes are phylogenetically distant from other species in the Coelopa genus and thus display certain behaviors that differ from other Coelopa flies.

== Distribution ==
Coelopa pilipes can be found in European countries with shorelines, such as Belgium, Britain, Denmark, France, Germany, Iceland, Ireland, Norway, and Poland. Other reported locations for C. pilipes residence include North Africa and Australia, where it is not native.

== Sympatry ==
In Britain, C. pilipes populations are always mixed with C. frigida, from adult to larval stages, in varying ratios. These numbers can depend on the season, as is found in northeastern populations in England. Number of nearby C. pilipes has been observed to affect the population size of sister species C. frigida, and vice versa. C. pilipes emergence can be greatly affected by the presence of C. frigida, including prolonged development and emergence times. They are generally more numerous than C. frigida in the summer months. On average, C. pilipes takes four more days than C. frigida in order to emerge from pupation as an adult.

== Habitat ==
On beaches, C. pilipes is able to thrive within decaying seaweed, which provides a relatively warm and humid environment throughout the year. Piles of seaweed on beaches are especially common after storms and high tides in the spring, both of which are becoming more severe with climate change. Even when the beach is covered in snow and ice, decay of the seaweed can generate temperatures of 40 °C (104 °F) in the inner layers of seaweed where Coelopa larvae live.

== Life history ==
During the summer, populations of C. pilipes decrease in number. They are most abundant in the fall and winter, when seaweed is most likely to be washed on the beach. All larval instars remain in the seaweed, and larval aggregations tend to not be mixed in species. If seaweed is washed back to sea, the larval population can decrease significantly with the loss of the seaweed habitat. Pupation begins in drier portions of seaweed, and the development time for C. pilipes is significantly longer than that of other Coelopa species such as C. frigida. Adult Coelopa flies are estimated to live around 2–4 weeks, with some variation.

== Food resources ==
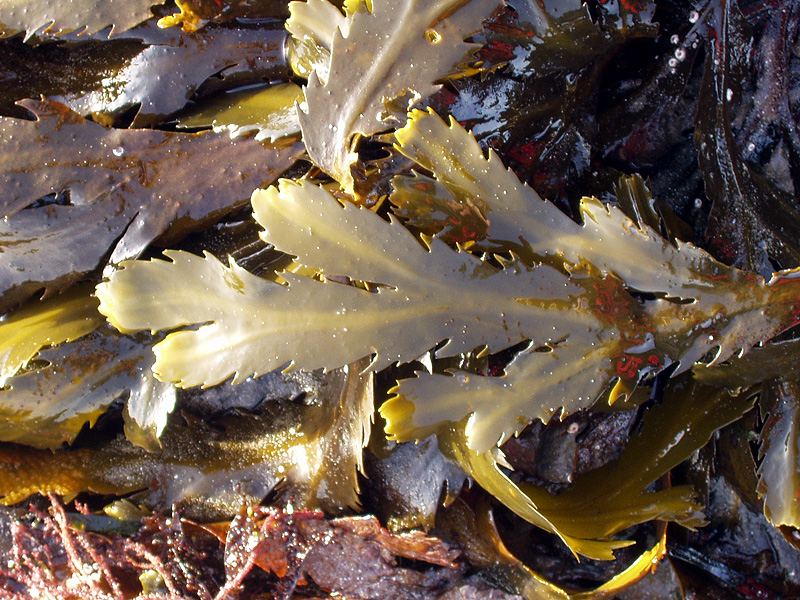
Fucus serratus

Larvae of C. pilipes feed on the same decomposing seaweed their eggs are deposited on. They may also consume bacteria found on the surface of the seaweed. If only raised on Laminaria seaweed, the flies have reduced growth due to a lower nutritious value of seaweed. The Fucus seaweed that the flies prefer most is prevalent in the North Pacific. The presence of Fucus can be associated with the number of C. pilipes flies at a certain site.

== Mating ==
Unlike flies that mate seasonally, C. pilipes is able to mate throughout the year, even during the winter, due to the constant environment of rotting seaweed on beaches. Adults are found to require both Fucus and Laminaria genera of seaweed in order to breed, and the presence of seaweed induces oviposition.

=== Male–female interaction ===
Fucus kelp has been observed to increase male harassment of females in addition to duration of copulation, showing the direct influence of environment on mating. Harassment rates are directly related to mating struggles. C. pilipes males increase harassment levels with more prolonged exposure to the seaweed.

Unlike other species, female C. pilipes have been shown to attempt rejection of males based on body size by performing abdominal bends. Willingness to mate can also be affected by the available seaweed types. Females may shake and kick to reject males; however, female resistance reduces as male harassment increases due to increased costs of resisting.

== Parental care ==
Adult C. pilipes lay their eggs after seaweed is deposited on the beach, during which initial decay creates a warmer environment on the seaweed. Larvae feed on the seaweed, promoting more decay, which attracts more females to lay their eggs. Females lay eggs singly within the decaying kelp. As a result, larvae are aggregated less densely than other species. Without Fucus seaweed, females are less likely to lay eggs.

== Parasites ==
Coelopa pilipes flies are prone to parasitism by the mite Thinoseius fucicola, with males being more susceptible.

== Genetics ==
Coelopa pilipes has 6 total chromosome pairs. 5 have median centromeres, and the remaining one is a dot-shaped pair. The shape of the chromosomes is relatively uniform. Heterochromatin is scattered throughout the chromosomes of C. pilipes flies, and the localization of sex-controlling genes is unknown, as there is no clear sexual dimorphism.

== Environmental physiology ==
Exposure to certain seaweed such as Fucus has been shown to increase mortality of some kelp fly species; however, virgin C. pilipes are able to delay this effect.

== Industrial use ==
Because C. pilipes has been successfully reared in the laboratory and contain significantly higher omega-3 polyunsaturated fatty acids, larvae have been studied for potential animal consumption as feed.
