= Coelopa vanduzeei =

Scientific classification
- Kingdom: Animalia
- Phylum: Arthropoda
- Class: Insecta
- Order: Diptera
- Family: Coelopidae
- Subfamily: Coelopinae
- Tribe: Coelopini
- Genus: Coelopa
- Species: C. vanduzeei

Binomial name
- Coelopa vanduzeei Cresson, 1914

Species of fly

Coelopa vanduzeei is a species of kelp flies in the family Coelopidae. They are scavengers on decaying vegetation and even marine mammals.
