= Dasycoelopa =

Scientific classification
- Domain: Eukaryota
- Kingdom: Animalia
- Phylum: Arthropoda
- Class: Insecta
- Order: Diptera
- Superfamily: Sciomyzoidea
- Family: Coelopidae
- Subfamily: Coelopinae
- Tribe: Glumini
- Genus: Dasycoelopa; Malloch, 1933

Type species
- Dasycoelopa australis Malloch, 1933

Genus of flies

Dasycoelopa is a genus of kelp flies in the family Coelopidae.

== Species ==
- Dasycoelopa australis Malloch, 1933
