= Coelopellini =

Scientific classification
- Domain: Eukaryota
- Kingdom: Animalia
- Phylum: Arthropoda
- Class: Insecta
- Order: Diptera
- Superfamily: Sciomyzoidea
- Family: Coelopidae
- Subfamily: Coelopinae
- Tribe: Coelopellini; McAlpine, 1991

Tribe of flies

Coelopellini is a tribe of kelp flies in the family Coelopidae.

== Genera ==
- Amma McAlpine, 1991
- Beaopterus Lamb, 1909
- Coelopella Malloch, 1933
- Icaridion Lamb, 1909Halteres absent and the wings are reduced to strips. New Zealand.
- Rhis McAlpine, 1991
- This McAlpine, 1991
