= Gluma (fly) =

Scientific classification
- Domain: Eukaryota
- Kingdom: Animalia
- Phylum: Arthropoda
- Class: Insecta
- Order: Diptera
- Superfamily: Sciomyzoidea
- Family: Coelopidae
- Subfamily: Coelopinae
- Tribe: Glumini
- Genus: Gluma; McAlpine, 1991

Genus of flies

Gluma is a genus of kelp flies in the family Coelopidae.

== Species ==
- Gluma keyzeri McAlpine, 1991
- Gluma musgravei McAlpine, 1991
- Gluma nitida McAlpine, 1991
