= Lopa (fly) =

Scientific classification
- Domain: Eukaryota
- Kingdom: Animalia
- Phylum: Arthropoda
- Class: Insecta
- Order: Diptera
- Superfamily: Sciomyzoidea
- Family: Coelopidae
- Subfamily: Lopinae
- Genus: Lopa; McAlpine, 1991

Type species
- Lopa convexa McAlpine, 1991

Genus of flies

Lopa is a genus of kelp flies in the family Coelopidae.

== Species ==
- Lopa convexa McAlpine, 1991
