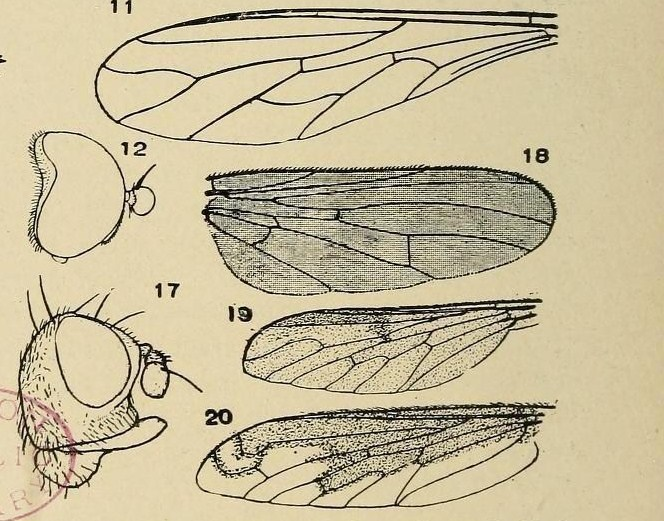
- figures 17, 18

Scientific classification
- Kingdom: Animalia
- Phylum: Arthropoda
- Clade: Pancrustacea
- Class: Insecta
- Order: Diptera
- Family: Heterocheilidae; McAlpine, 1991
- Genus: Heterocheila; Rondani, 1857

Type species
- Heteromyza buccata Fallén, 1820

Species
- Heterocheila buccata Rondani, 1857; Heterocheila hannai (Cole, 1921)

= Heterocheila =

Genus of flies

Heterocheila is a genus of acalyptrate true flies (Diptera). They are placed in their own family, Heterocheilidae, in the superfamily Sciomyzoidea. They are not widely familiar outside entomological circles, but the common name "half-bridge flies" has been associated with them. They are medium-sized flies occurring mainly in temperate regions on seashores of the Northern Hemisphere, where they and their larvae typically feed on stranded kelp in the wrack zone. In this, they resemble kelp flies, which are members of a different family, though the same superfamily.

The family Heterocheilidae was established by McAlpine in 1991. He distinguished it from other families to which Heterocheila had hitherto been referred at various times and by various authorities – Helcomyzidae, Dryomyzidae and Coelopidae.

== Description ==
For terms, see Morphology of Diptera.

The Heterocheilidae are medium to moderately large (body length 4.2-6.5 mm), fairly robust, brown flies. Their postverical bristles are long and often parallel. Three fronto-orbital bristles are seen. The acrostichal bristles are in a single row with a larger prescutellar pair; the metepisternum is bare. The prosternum is triangular, and extended laterally to the propleuron as a narrow, precoxal bridge. The costa is unbroken and the crossveins are unmarked. The midregion of costa lacks anteroventral spines. The apical section of vein M is nearly straight, terminating posterior of wing apex. Crossvein Bm-Cu is almost aligned with vein CuA2. Vein CuA2+A1 reaches the wing margin.

== Species ==
Two species have been described:

- Heterocheila buccata Rondani, 1857 has a Palearctic distribution in North America and Eurasia.
- Heterocheila hannai (Cole, 1921) has been reported from the NE USA coast of Alaska, Oregon, and Washington.

The genus name Oedoparea Loew, 1862 is regarded as synonymous.
