= Lopinae =

Scientific classification
- Domain: Eukaryota
- Kingdom: Animalia
- Phylum: Arthropoda
- Class: Insecta
- Order: Diptera
- Superfamily: Sciomyzoidea
- Family: Coelopidae
- Subfamily: Lopinae; McAlpine, 1991

Subfamily of flies

Lopinae is a subfamily of kelp flies in the family Coelopidae.

== Classification ==
- Genus Lopa McAlpine, 1991
