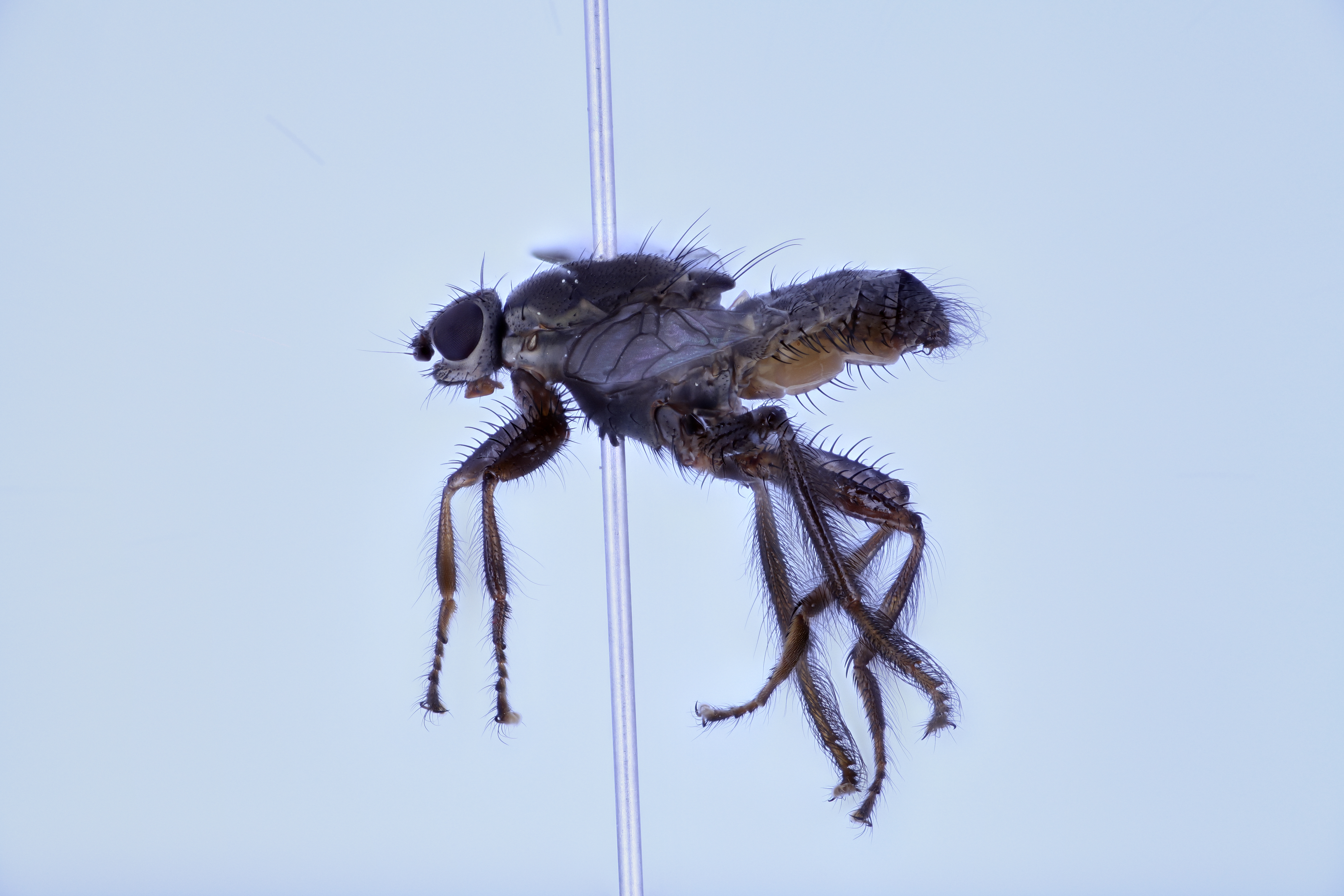

Scientific classification
- Domain: Eukaryota
- Kingdom: Animalia
- Phylum: Arthropoda
- Class: Insecta
- Order: Diptera
- Superfamily: Sciomyzoidea
- Family: Coelopidae
- Subfamily: Coelopinae
- Tribe: Glumini
- Genus: Chaetocoelopa; Malloch, 1933

Type species
- Coelopa monstruosa Hutton, 1901

Synonyms
- Coelopa anomala Cole, 1923

= Chaetocoelopa =

Genus of flies

Chaetocoelopa is a genus of kelp flies in the family Coelopidae.

== Species ==
- Chaetocoelopa littoralis (Hutton, 1881)
- Chaetocoelopa sydneyensis (Schiner, 1868)
