= Coelopina =

Scientific classification
- Domain: Eukaryota
- Kingdom: Animalia
- Phylum: Arthropoda
- Class: Insecta
- Order: Diptera
- Superfamily: Sciomyzoidea
- Family: Coelopidae
- Subfamily: Coelopinae
- Tribe: Glumini
- Genus: Coelopina; Malloch, 1933

Type species
- Coelopa anomala Cole, 1923

Genus of flies

Coelopina is a genus of kelp flies in the family Coelopidae.

== Species ==
- Coelopina anomala (Cole, 1923)
