= Paractora =

Scientific classification
- Kingdom: Animalia
- Phylum: Arthropoda
- Class: Insecta
- Order: Diptera
- Superfamily: Sciomyzoidea
- Family: Helcomyzidae
- Genus: Paractora; Bigot, 1888

Genus of flies

Paractora is a genus of flies in the family Helcomyzidae.

== Species ==
- P. angustata Malloch, 1933
- P. antarctica (Thomson, 1869)
- P. asymmetrica (Enderlein, 1930)
- P. bipunctata (Hutton, 1901)
- P. dreuxi Séguy, 1965
- P. jeanneli Séguy, 1940
- P. moseleyi (Austen, 1913)
- P. rufipes (Macquart, 1844)
- P. trichosterna (Thomson, 1869)
