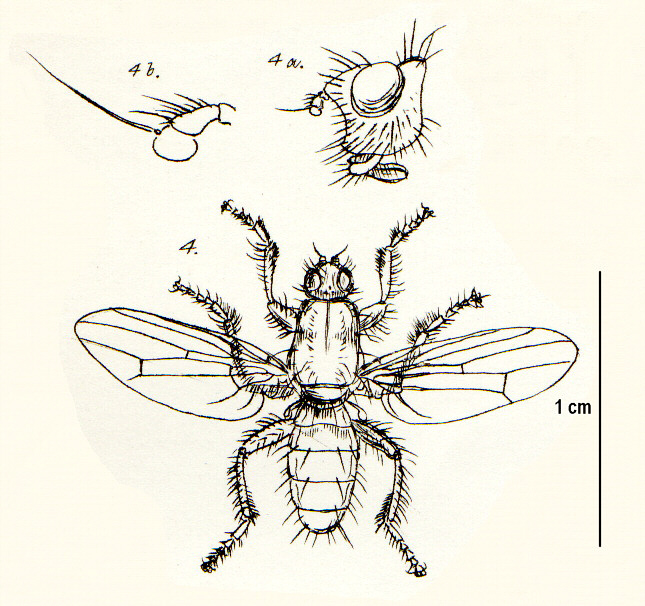
- Coelopa frigida

Scientific classification
- Domain: Eukaryota
- Kingdom: Animalia
- Phylum: Arthropoda
- Class: Insecta
- Order: Diptera
- Family: Coelopidae
- Subfamily: Coelopinae
- Tribe: Coelopini
- Genus: Coelopa; Meigen, 1830

= Coelopa =

Genus of flies

Coelopa is a genus of kelp flies in the family Coelopidae. There are about 14 described species in Coelopa.

== Species ==
These 12 species belong to the genus Coelopa:

- Subgenus Coelopa Meigen, 1830
  C. pilipes Haliday, 1838
- Subgenus Fucomyia Haliday, 1837
  C. aequatorialis Bezzi, 1892
  C. alluaudi Séguy, 1941
  C. dasypoda Bezzi, 1908
  C. frigida (Fabricius, 1805) (seaweed fly)
  C. nebularum Aldrich, 1929
  C. orientalis Macquart, 1843
  C. stejnegeri Aldrich, 1929
  C. ursina (Wiedemann, 1824)
- Subgenus Neocoelopa Malloch, 1933
  C. vanduzeei Cresson, 1914
- Nomen dubium
  C. fumifer (Walker, 1861)
  C. glabra Walker, 1849
  C. offendens Walker, 1861

=== Coelopa frigida ===
Coelopa frigida is one of the most widely distribute species of seaweed fly. This species is found on the shorelines of the temperate Northern Hemisphere. Often confused for the morphologically similar Coelopa nebularum and Coelopa pilipes. C. frigida feeds primarily on seaweed and stay around these habitats.
