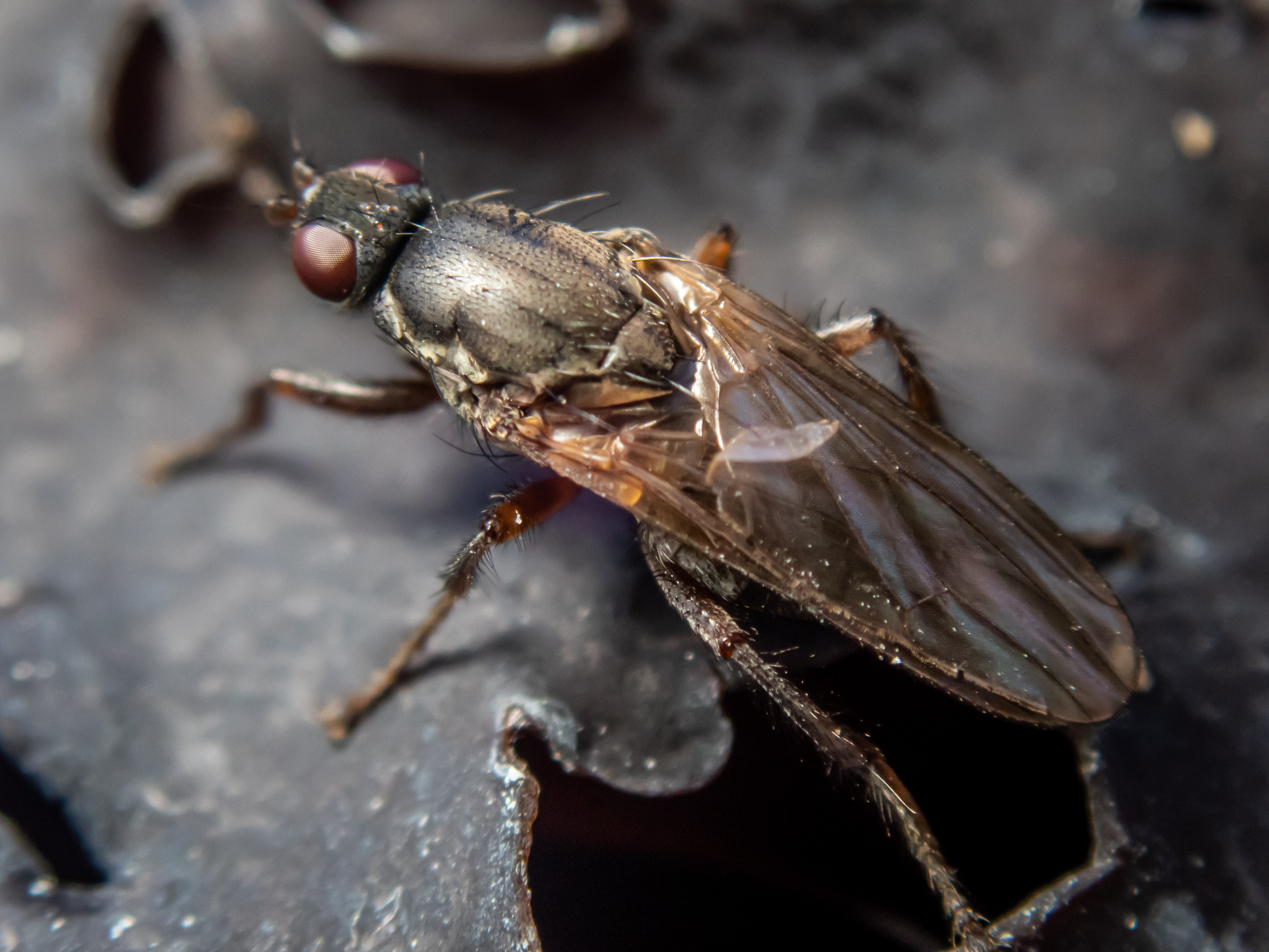

Scientific classification
- Kingdom: Animalia
- Phylum: Arthropoda
- Clade: Pancrustacea
- Class: Insecta
- Order: Diptera
- Family: Coelopidae
- Subfamily: Coelopinae
- Tribe: Glumini
- Genus: Chaetocoelopa
- Species: C. littoralis

Binomial name
- Chaetocoelopa littoralis (Hutton, 1881)

Synonyms
- Coelopa littoralis Hutton, 1881; Coelopa monstruosa Hutton, 1901; Chaetocoelopa huttoni Harrison, 1959

= Chaetocoelopa littoralis =

Species of fly endemic to New Zealand

Chaetocoelopa littoralis, commonly known as the hairy kelp fly, is a fly of the family Coelopidae. It is endemic to New Zealand and is widely distributed around the coastline, including offshore islands. These flies are black in appearance and show large variation in size, with males tending to be larger and more robust and 'hairy' than females.

== Description ==
C. littoralis is a small fly with long hairy legs, and a body length of approximately 7 mm. The fly is able to walk on the surface of water, and can survive and recover from inundation by waves. Hutton originally described this species as follows:

Grey. A broad band on the head, stretching up on each side of the ocelli. Antennæ, palpi, proboscis, and legs reddish-brown. Legs and abdomen with long black hairs; thorax with short black hairs. Wings hyaline, with brown veins.

== Taxonomy ==
This species was first described by F. W. Hutton in 1881 and named Coelopa littoralis. In 1901 Hutton, thinking he was describing a new species, again named this species Coelopa monstruosa. In 1933 John R. Malloch placed this species within the genus Chaetocoelopa. The male lectotype specimen is held at the Canterbury Museum.

== Distribution ==
C. littoralis is endemic to New Zealand and is found throughout New Zealand's coast, including offshore islands. A study of coastal Diptera species at 109 locations distributed around the New Zealand coastline found C. littoralis at 41% of the sites.

== Habitat and hosts ==
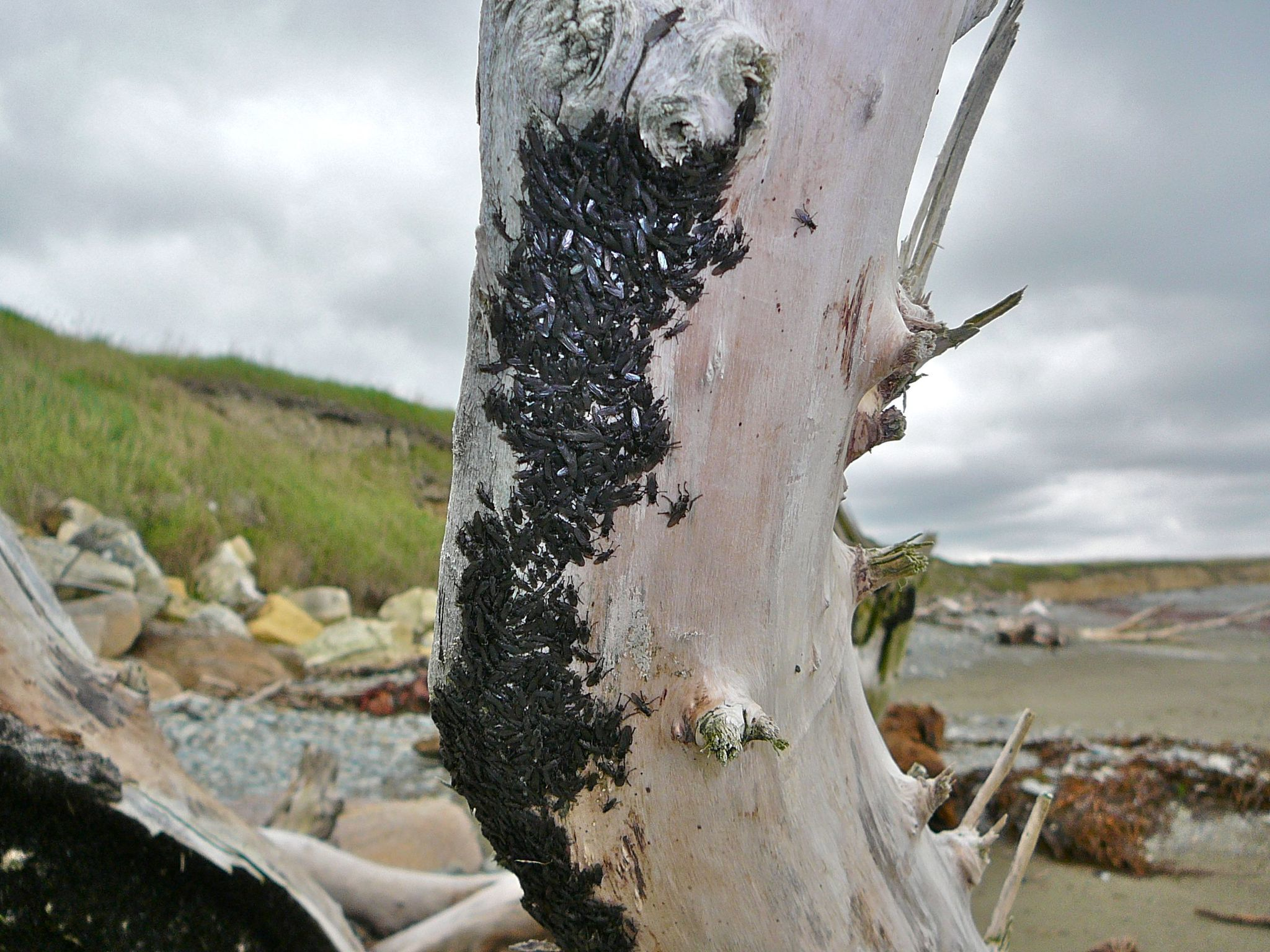
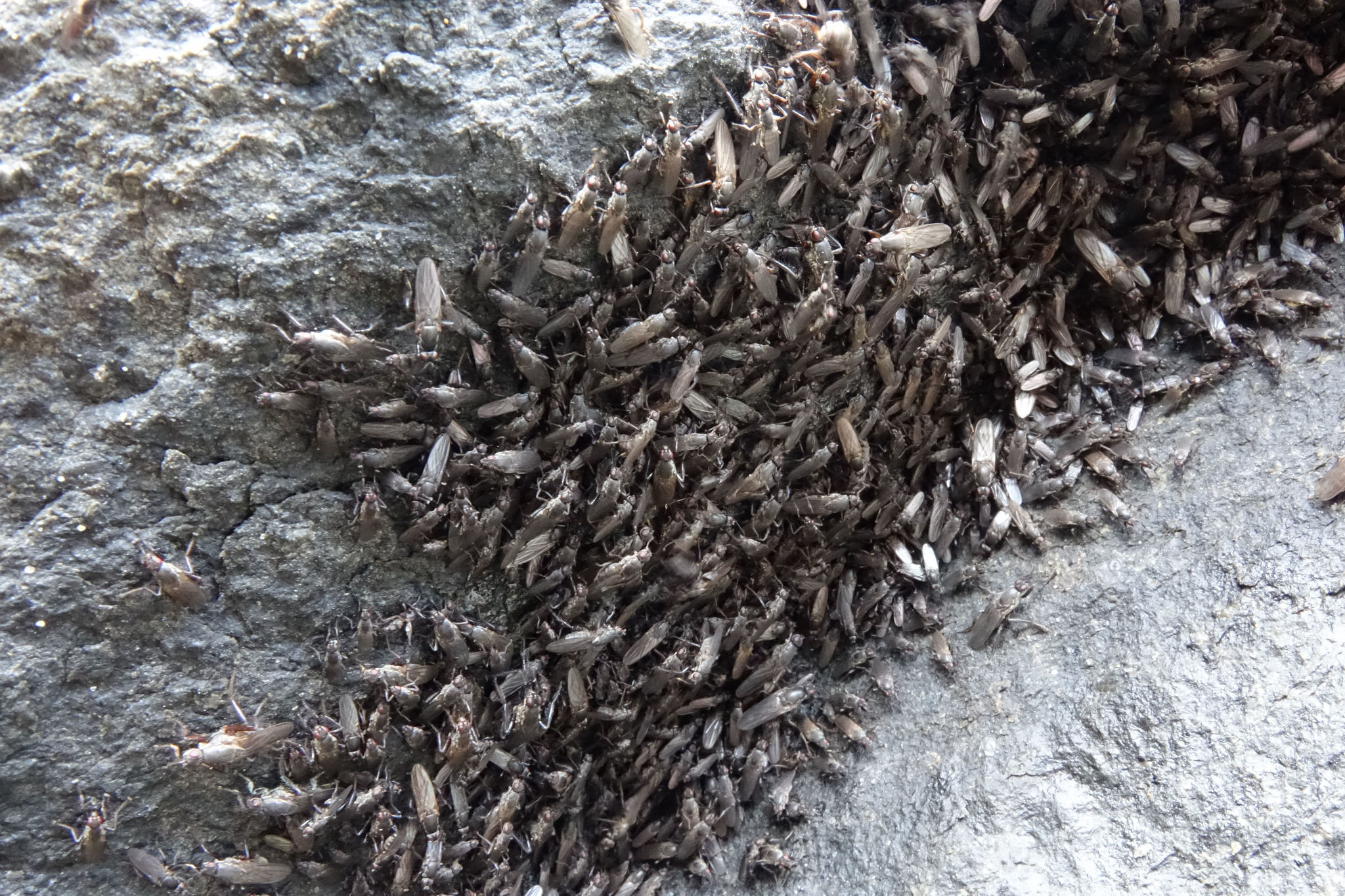

Like other species in the family Coelopidae, C. littoralis inhabit beds of decaying seaweed and kelp (wrack) washed up on the coast, and can form large aggregations.

The larvae of C. littoralis play an important role in assisting decomposition of rotting seaweed on the shoreline. C. littoralis is found in beds of decaying seaweed and kelp (wrack) washed up on the coast, and can also be observed resting on surfaces including cliff faces and driftwood in large aggregations. The adults and larvae of C. littoralis are a significant food source for shore birds such as the New Zealand dotterel (Charadrius obscurus) and the New Zealand pipit (Anthus novaeseelandiae).

== Life cycle ==
Studies of the mating behaviour of C. littoralis have shown that in common with other Coelopids, larger males have greater mating success, because they are more able to overcome the common resistance behaviours of the female. Adult flies mate within the wrack beds, and females lay their eggs onto the wrack. Their larvae feed on the decaying algae and its associated microorganisms, and go through three developmental stages (or instar) before pupating on sand further up the beach.
