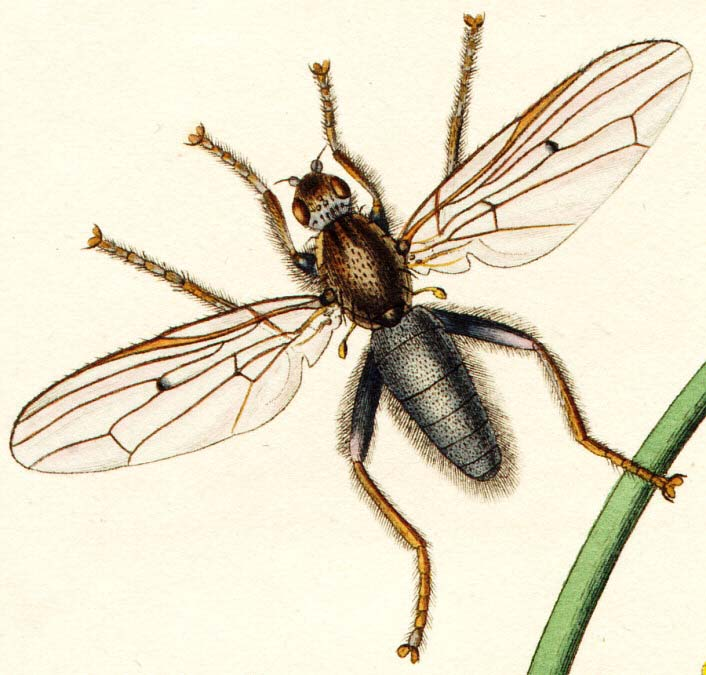
- H. ustulata

Scientific classification
- Domain: Eukaryota
- Kingdom: Animalia
- Phylum: Arthropoda
- Class: Insecta
- Order: Diptera
- Superfamily: Sciomyzoidea
- Family: Helcomyzidae
- Genus: Helcomyza; Curtis, 1825

= Helcomyza =

Genus of flies

Helcomyza is a genus of flies in the family Helcomyzidae. There are at least three described species in Helcomyza.

== Species ==
These three species belong to the genus Helcomyza:

- H. mediterranea (Loew, 1854)
- H. mirabilis Melander, 1920
- H. ustulata Curtis, 1825
