= Marine wrack =

Marine wrack may refer to:

- wrack (seaweed), several species of seaweed
- beach wrack, organic material deposited at high tide on beaches.
