= Glumini =

Scientific classification
- Domain: Eukaryota
- Kingdom: Animalia
- Phylum: Arthropoda
- Class: Insecta
- Order: Diptera
- Superfamily: Sciomyzoidea
- Family: Coelopidae
- Subfamily: Coelopinae
- Tribe: Glumini; McAlpine, 1991

Tribe of flies

Glumini is a tribe of kelp flies in the family Coelopidae.

== Genera ==
- Chaetocoelopa Malloch, 1933
- Coelopina Malloch, 1933
- Dasycoelopa Malloch, 1933
- Gluma McAlpine, 1991
- Malacomyia Haliday in Westwood, 1840 (sometimes placed in Dryomyzidae)
