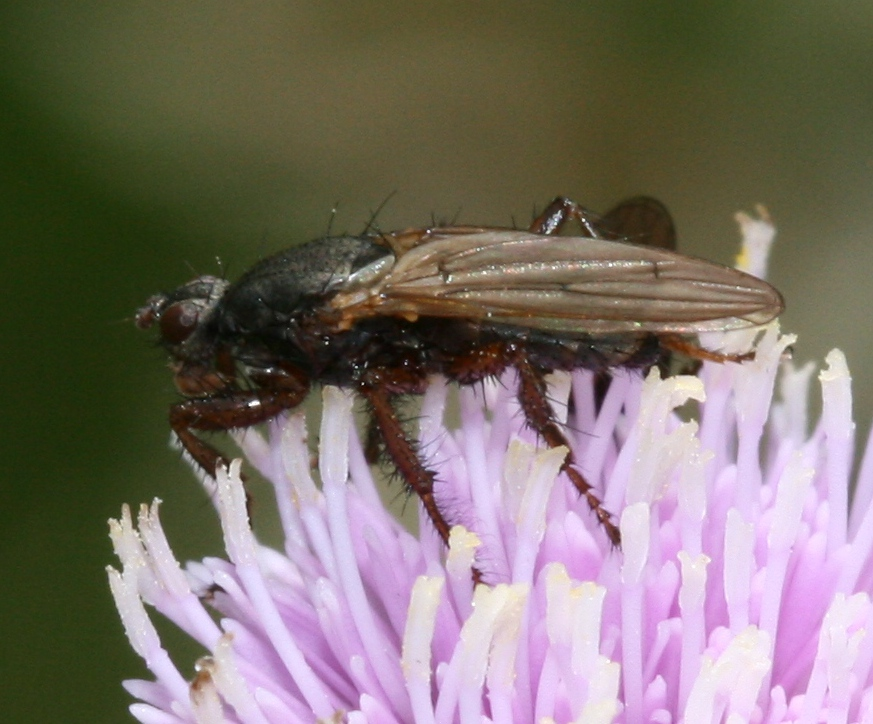

Scientific classification
- Kingdom: Animalia
- Phylum: Arthropoda
- Clade: Pancrustacea
- Class: Insecta
- Order: Diptera
- Family: Coelopidae
- Genus: Coelopa
- Species: C. frigida

Binomial name
- Coelopa frigida (Fabricius, 1805)

= Coelopa frigida =

Species of fly

Coelopa frigida is a species of seaweed fly or kelp fly. It is the most widely distributed species of seaweed fly. It can be found on most shorelines in the temperate Northern Hemisphere. Other species of seaweed flies include Coelopa nebularum and Coelopa pilipes. C. frigida feeds primarily on seaweed, and groups of C. frigida flies tend to populate near bodies of water. Climate change has led to an increase in C. frigida blooms along shores, which creates a pest problem for human beach-goers. C. frigida is also an important organism for the study of sexual selection, particularly female choice, which is influenced by genetics.

== Description ==
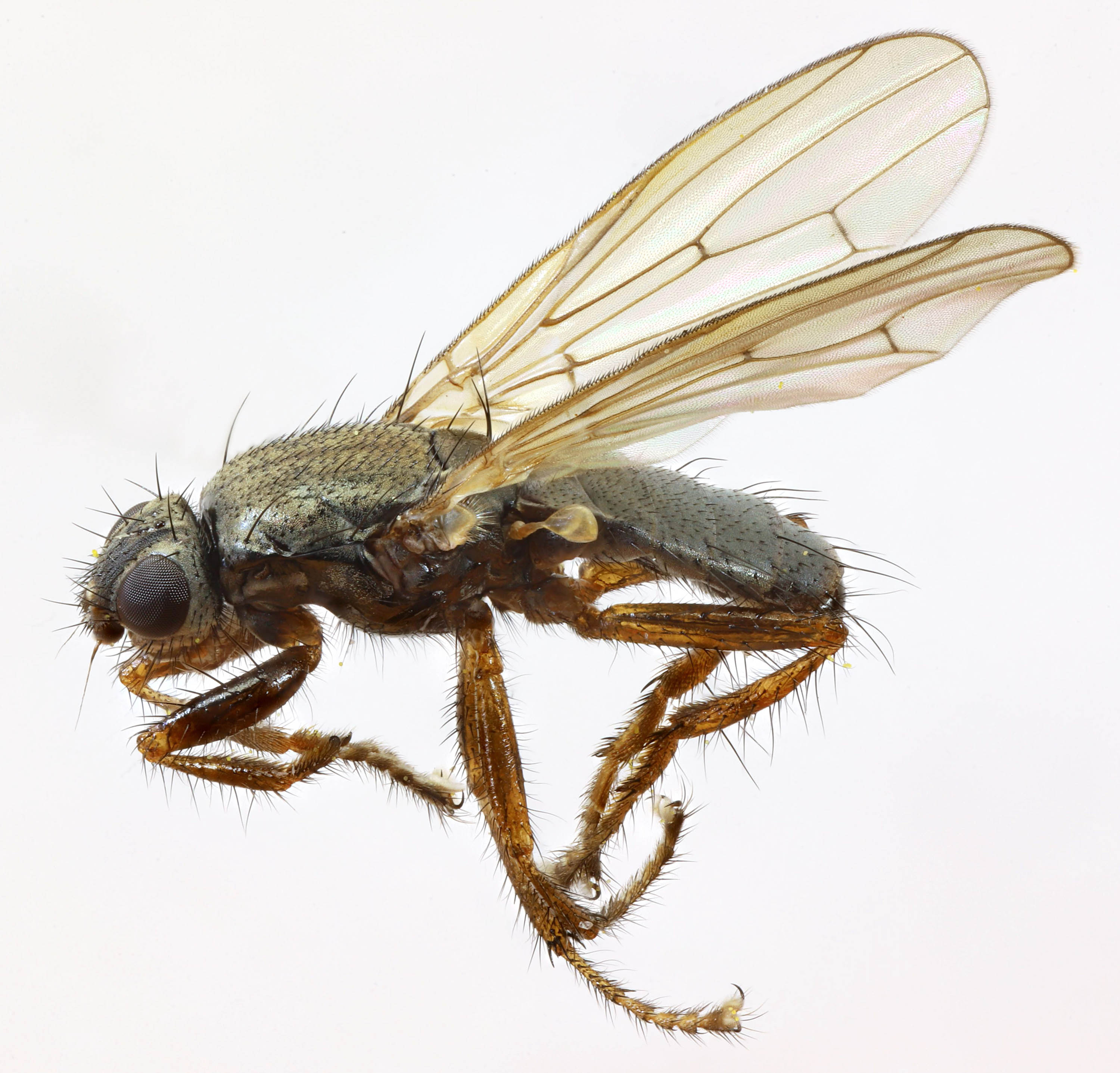
Adult C. frigida

C. frigida are the most common seaweed fly. They tend to aggregate on beaches with an abundance of stranded algae, but occasionally swarm inland. Their physical features include a dark brown to black body, a set of lighter colored legs, and large, translucent wings. Males are typically larger than females, though there is a wide range of adult sizes within the species. C. nebularum is currently suggested as a close cousin or even possible subspecies of C. frigida. This article therefore includes specifics regarding C. nebularum.

== Distribution ==
C. frigida are commonly found on beaches with a relatively steady supply of stranded kelp, as the fly species is dependent on the decaying green and brown algae for both feeding and breeding. The geographic range, which is well documented, extends up the North Atlantic Coast into Iceland and encompasses the coasts of Russia, the North Sea, and Faroe Islands. Other regions reported to contain C. nebularum are found on the Pacific Coast of North America, the coast of Japan's Kuril Islands, and the eastern coasts of Russia.

== Habitat ==
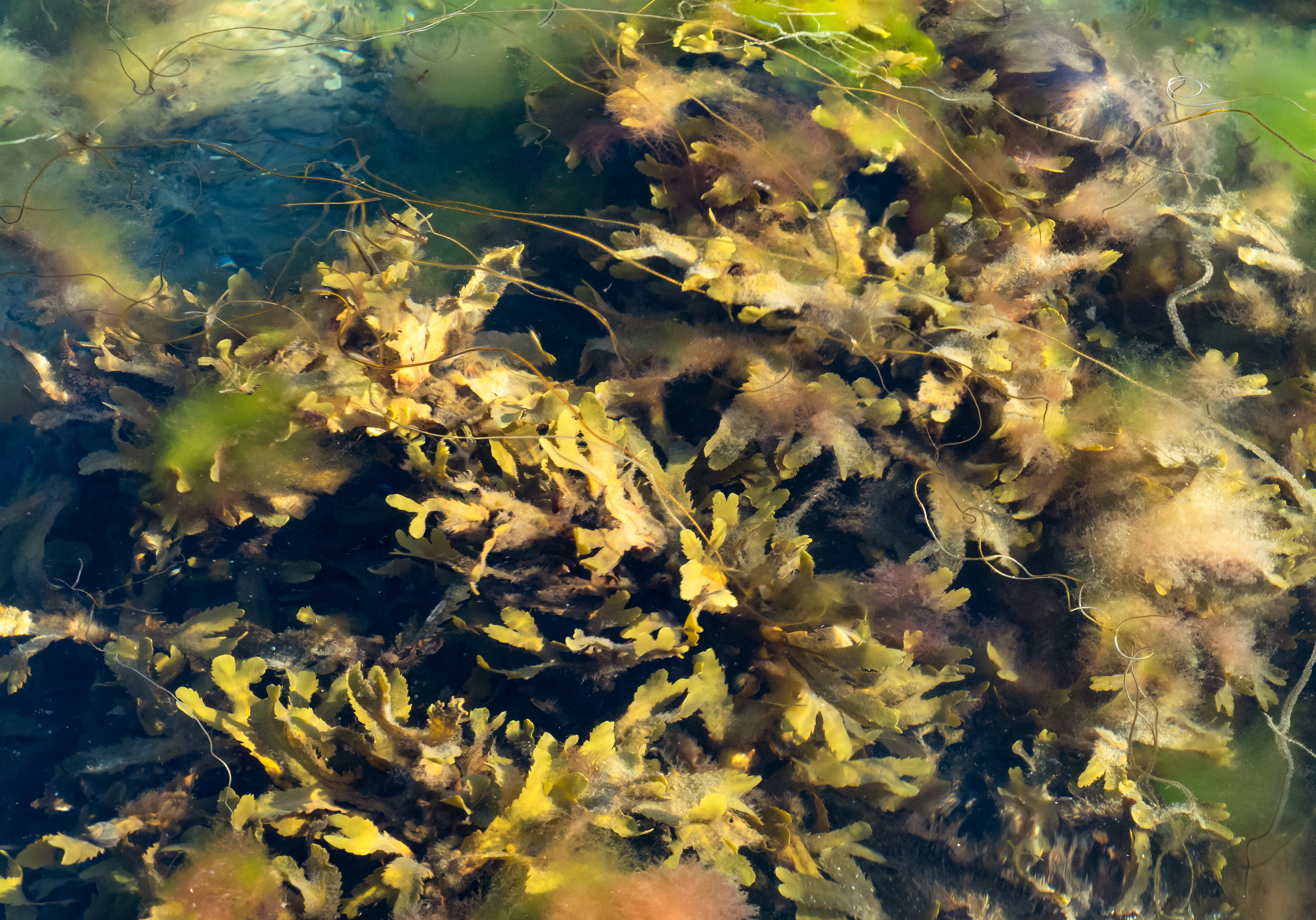
Algae

C. frigida need a constant supply of algae to feed and lay their eggs. Thus, coastal beaches with stranded seaweed are their preferred environment. The significant factors that determine the population density and spread are the age of algae, the presence or absence of high winds or storms, the rate of decay of algae, and temperature.

=== Influence of weather ===
Research shows that storms and their accompanying harsh weather conditions cause an overall decrease in the life expectancy of C. frigida.

Lower temperatures allow for beached seaweed to remain fresh for a longer period of time. Lower temperatures also force C. frigida to incubate in the egg stage to a greater extent before hatching. Meanwhile, higher temperatures cause an acceleration in the decomposition of algae and also increases the rate of egg development. There has been no significant research done on differentiating the average lifetimes of C. frigida exposed to different temperatures.

== Taxonomy ==
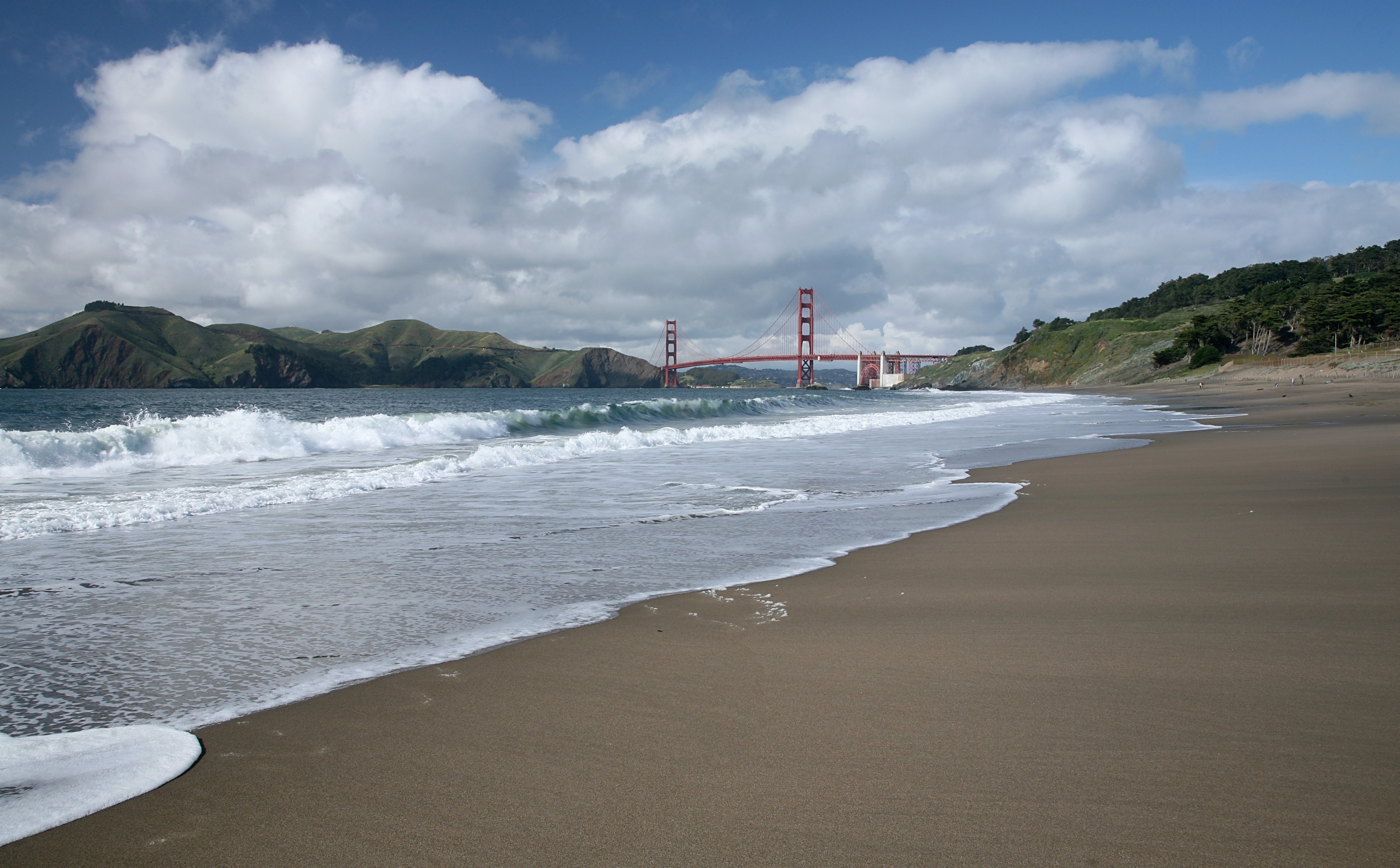
C. frigida typically resides in environments containing seaweed such as beaches

The first documented discovery of C. frigida was in 1805 by Fabricius. He called the fly frigida, meaning "cold", presumably from his comment "Habitat in Norwagiae Lapponis frigoris summi patiens," meaning "It lives in Norwegian Lapland, tolerating extreme cold." Throughout history, there have been many additions and changes suggested. Haliday discovered different sizes of C. frigida on the coast of Ireland and gave them the names: C. gravis, C. simplex, and C parvula. Stenhammer similarly found the species on the coast of Scandinavia, and dubbed them C. nitidula and C. eximia. Only after Aldrich and Hennig's revision of the entire Palearctic fauna of Coelopa did the current standing of nomenclature come to light. Currently, C. frigida is the official name for this species of fly. There is an ongoing dispute on whether C. nebularum should be considered a subspecies of C. frigida or recently speciated species of Coelopa.

== Life history ==
=== Egg ===
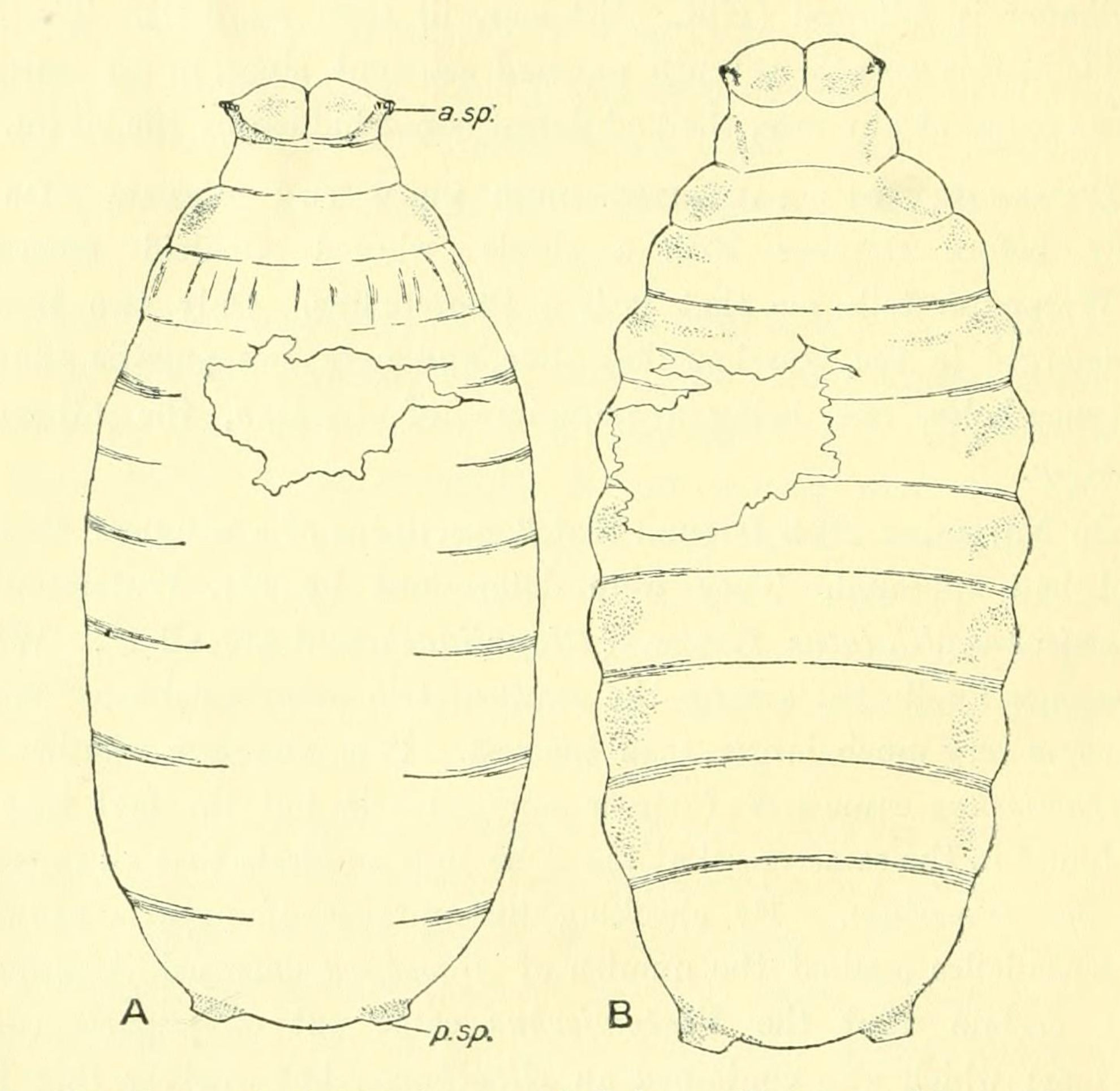
Pupae illustration

C. frigida's egg phase is on average 12.25 ± 1.05 days, but changes depending on the presence of alcohol dehydrogenase or higher temperatures. Higher temperatures, such as those caused by climate change, may cause eggs to hatch more quickly. The eggs are laid en masse in the leaves of stranded algae.

=== Adult ===
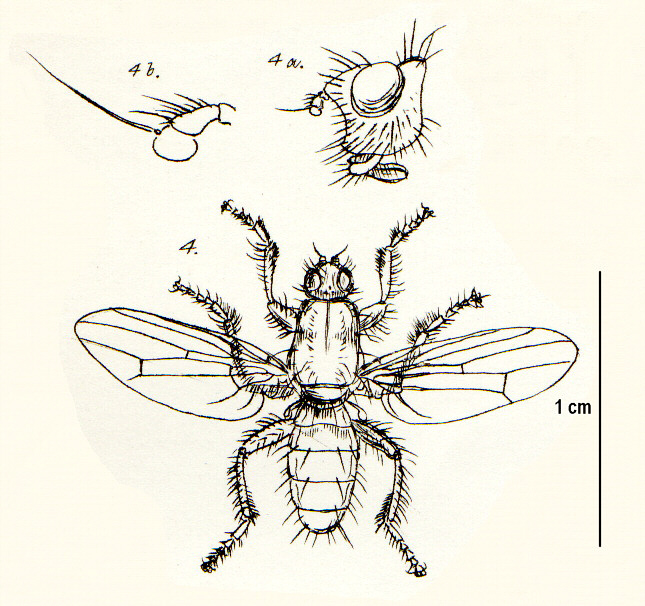
Adult C. Frigida

The adults emerge from their pupal shells ready to fly in search of mates. Their wings are typically 6 mm and once dry carry them around their current seaweed plot or to other stranded algae. Their bodies are colored a light brown to black, with a few yellow specks. Lastly, their legs are much longer than before eclosion and have hooked attachments at the end to better grip onto seaweed.

The fly oviposits in dead kelp that washes up on beaches. This is the only place it lays eggs, and it can do so on many species of kelp and seaweed, including species of Laminaria and Fucus. A female fly lays up to five clutches of 80 eggs each. The larvae feed upon the bacteria coating the dead kelp. The life cycle is about 30 days long.

== Food resources ==
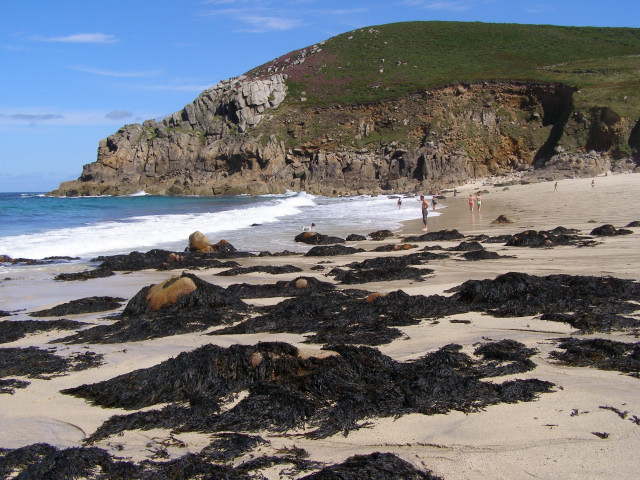
Beached seaweed

The main food source for C. frigida is seaweed that has washed up onto the beaches. The adults detect the scent of the seaweed and lie their eggs in the decaying algae. The seaweed's particular environment allows the eggs to hatch, and the larvae begin to burrow into the seaweed. The brown and green algae preferred by C. frigida are usually of either the genus Lamniaria or the genus Fucus. There is still research being done on whether it is the seaweed itself, the microorganisms within it, or a combination of the two that provides the nutrition needed by the C. frigida larvae. The algae also provides a safe habitat to live in and a perfect moist environment for eggs, which prevents desiccation. Most adults stay in the seaweed patch of their birth until it returns to the ocean, at which point the adults fly in search of alternative algae bunches to feed, live, and mate on.

== Morphology ==
There are four defining characteristics of C. frigida. The first is the size of the body, which ranges from 5 mm to 6 mm. The size of the body depends on the specific alpha or beta alleles associated with chromosomal inversion. The alpha genes causes individuals to grow to a larger size with a "peacock's tail". However, these larger individual typically spend 2-4 more days throughout the development process before becoming adults. The bodies range from a dark brown to black. The second is color of the legs. The legs of C. frigida are mostly all the same size, with the only difference being in color. The hue of the legs range from a light brown, to yellow, to black. The third and fourth features are their tergite and accompanying bristles. Most individuals of C. frigida have 6 tergites. Their size may differ according to how far along each individual is in their adult life. The color of their tergites is generally dark brown. Lastly, the accompanying bristles on the tergites vary in different lengths. Most are proportional to the overall body or tergite size. The color of such setae are either black or the color of the attached tergite.

=== Ecological adaptations ===
C. frigida are highly waterproof due to the a collection of hairs that cover their entire exoskeleton. They can easily escape from algae/seaweed beds that are pulled back into the ocean by simply bobbing up to the surface and then flying back to the coast. This waterproofing has been tested by placing adults into a bottle of seawater and shaking vigorously, with the only result observed being still-dry flies emerging from the water.

== Mating ==
Mating behavior in C. frigida is dictated by larger males attempting to copulate with smaller females. Larger males have an increased mating success rate than their smaller counterparts. Thus, sexual selection tends to favor males that are larger or can latch on to females more tightly. This sexual selection for larger males is countered by natural selection for smaller males. Smaller males have a lower incubation time, and thus are more likely to survive past their developmental age to adulthood. C. frigida are polygynous, with females devoting the majority of resources to laying eggs to increase their reproductive success. Meanwhile, the males choose to mate with as many receptive females as possible to increase their reproductive success.

=== Laboratory studies ===
This fly is sometimes cultured in the laboratory. Its behavior is studied in an effort to understand sexual selection, especially female choice. Studies suggest that female flies of this species prefer larger males to smaller.

The species engages in lekking and sexual conflict. Females perform rejection behaviors when mounted by males, and may mate with larger males because larger males are more able to force the mating. As females are more likely to successfully reject smaller males, sexual selection favors larger ones. Mating behaviors are genetically influenced, as evidenced by a preference for smaller males among females of a certain genotype.

== Genetic research ==
There are two main focuses of genetic research on C. frigida. The first aspect is the differentiation of C. frigida from similar looking flies and C. nebularum. The second focus is on the chromosomal inversion of certain alleles to produce flies of differing sizes, and natural selection on certain sizes.

The initial discovery of C. frigida was confused due to their variance in size. This dispute was mostly cleared by delving past their physical characteristics into their genetics, in which most of the seaweed flies were found to belong to C. frigida. The only majorly differing genetic line was associated with C. nebularum. C. Nebularum had only recently speciated from C. frigida due to geographic differences, thus it is still widely debated if they belong in the same species or if they're close cousins.

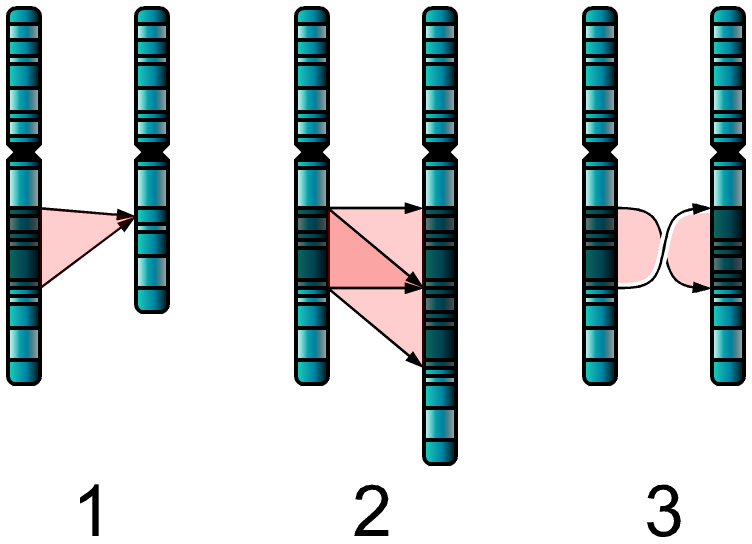
Chromosomal Inversion

The chromosomal inversion of the alpha or beta allele in C. frigida produces a distinct difference in adult size. Individuals homozygous for the alpha allele are physically larger and more developed. They benefit from the physicality with increased longevity and increased fecundity. However, these individuals have 2–4 days more in their developmental phases to grow to such an extent. These may be precious days that the seaweed bed is washed back into the ocean, killing the C. frigida. On the other hand, individuals homozygous for the beta allele are physically smaller. They benefit by growing into their adult phase faster, but have more trouble finding receptive mates.

== Enemies ==
C. frigida competes with another seaweed fly, C. pilipes, for resources. One might think that the number one predator of C. frigida would be birds such as sandpipers. Seabirds (including the purple sandpiper, Calidris maritima) do eat adult flies; however, these birds only peck within the first few inches of the seaweed and don't penetrate deep enough to get to the eggs and larvae. On the other hand, insects from the Coleoptera and Hymenoptera order have been found to eat C. frigida eggs and larvae in laboratory conditions. More research needs to be done to conclude their presence in the seaweed and their feeding habits.

C. frigida is also host to the mite Thinoseius fucicola.

== Human interaction ==
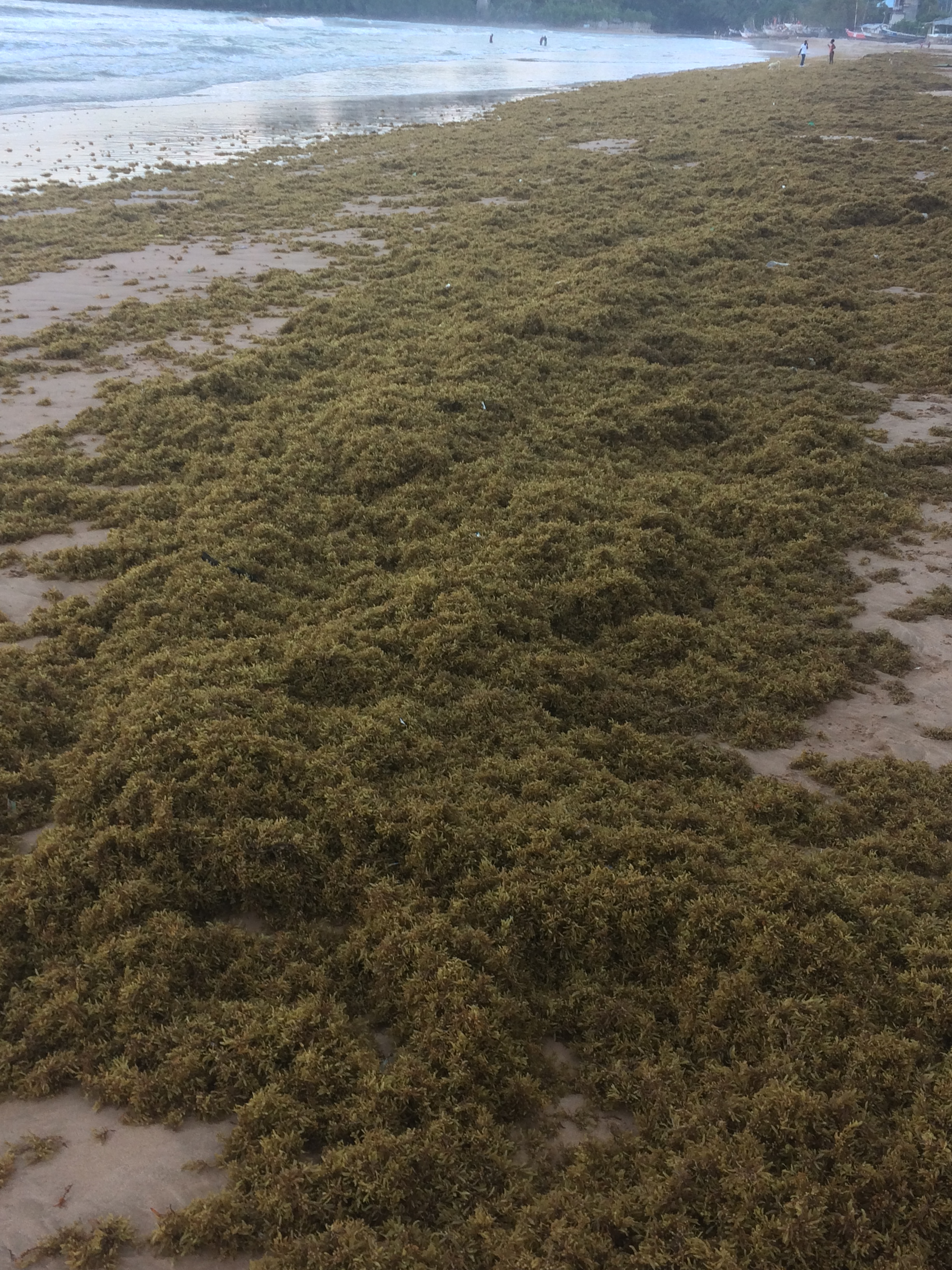
Overflow of seaweed

Typically, the leks that C. frigida form stay within their optimal environment of seaweed patches. However, due to increasing temperatures and more frequent storms resulting from climate change, more algae is washed ashore and accompanying it is an increase in the population density of C. frigida. "Blooms" of the flies can occur, possibly when temperatures and amounts of kelp increase. These aggregations are known to pester and annoy beachgoers, but may also be blown inland to city dwellers.
