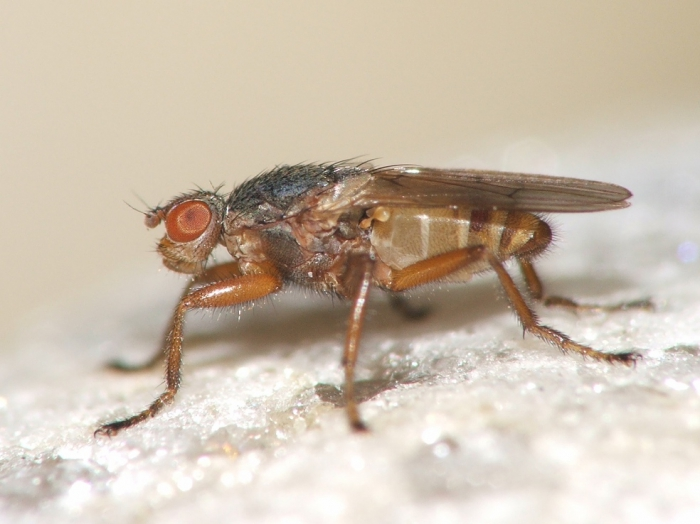
- Malacomyia sciomyzina

Scientific classification
- Kingdom: Animalia
- Phylum: Arthropoda
- Class: Insecta
- Order: Diptera
- Family: Coelopidae
- Subfamily: Coelopinae
- Tribe: Glumini
- Genus: Malacomyia; Haliday in Westwood, 1840

Synonyms
- Malacomyza Haliday in Curtis, 1837; Phycodroma Stenhammar, 1854

= Malacomyia =

Genus of flies

Malacomyia is a genus of kelp flies in the family Coelopidae.

== Species ==
- Malacomyia sciomyzina (Haliday, 1833)
