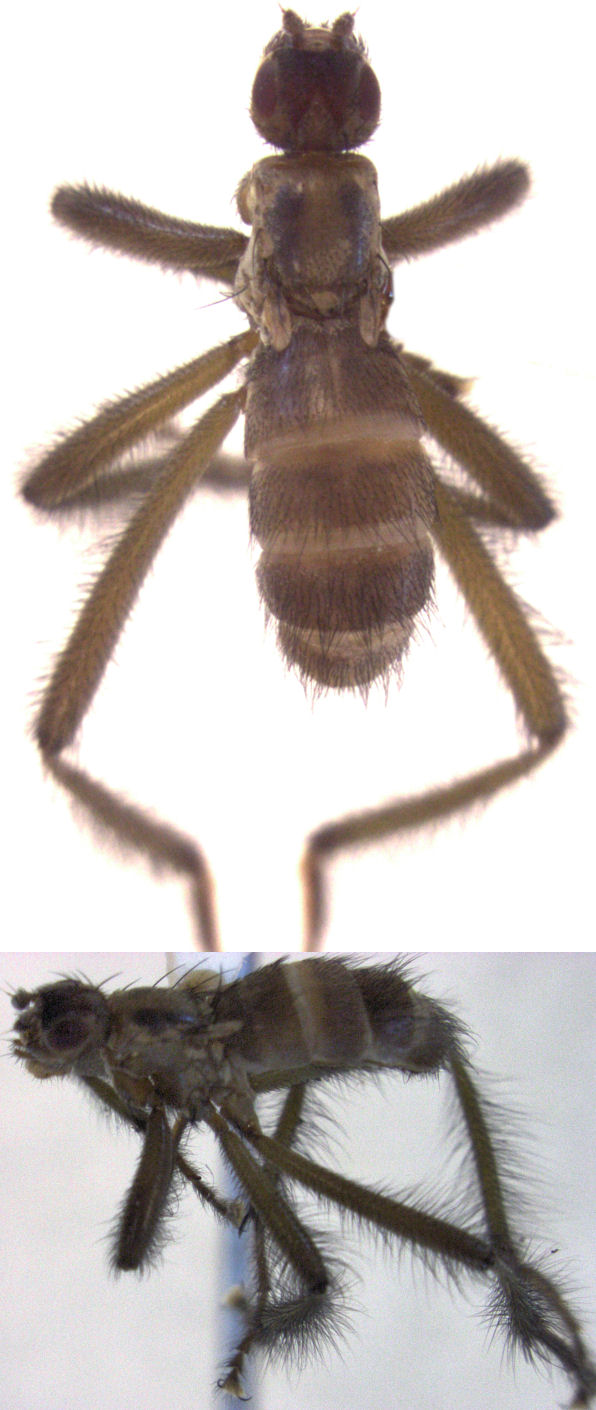
- Adult male Icaridion nasutum

Scientific classification
- Domain: Eukaryota
- Kingdom: Animalia
- Phylum: Arthropoda
- Class: Insecta
- Order: Diptera
- Family: Coelopidae
- Subfamily: Coelopinae
- Tribe: Coelopellini
- Genus: Icaridion; Lamb, 1909

Type species
- Icaridion nasutum Lamb, 1909

= Icaridion =

Genus of flies

Icaridion is a genus of kelp fly in the family Coelopidae.

== Species ==
- Icaridion debile (Lamb, 1909)
- Icaridion nasutum Lamb, 1909
- Icaridion nigrifrons (Lamb, 1909)
