= Coelopella =

Scientific classification
- Domain: Eukaryota
- Kingdom: Animalia
- Phylum: Arthropoda
- Class: Insecta
- Order: Diptera
- Family: Coelopidae
- Subfamily: Coelopinae
- Tribe: Coelopellini
- Genus: Coelopella; Malloch, 1933

Type species
- Coelopella plebeia Malloch, 1933

Genus of flies

Coelopella is a genus of kelp flies in the family Coelopidae.

== Species ==
- , Coelopella curvipes, (Hutton, 1902).
