= Beaopterus =

Scientific classification
- Kingdom: Animalia
- Phylum: Arthropoda
- Class: Insecta
- Order: Diptera
- Family: Coelopidae
- Subfamily: Coelopinae
- Tribe: Coelopellini
- Genus: Beaopterus; Lamb, 1909

Type species
- Beaopterus robustus Lamb, 1909

Synonyms
- Protocoelopa Malloch, 1933

Genus of flies

Beaopterus is a genus of kelp fly in the family Coelopidae.

== Species ==
- Beaopterus philpotti (Malloch, 1933)
- Beaopterus robustus Lamb, 1909
