= Coelopini =

Scientific classification
- Kingdom: Animalia
- Phylum: Arthropoda
- Class: Insecta
- Order: Diptera
- Subsection: Acalyptratae
- Superfamily: Sciomyzoidea
- Family: Coelopidae
- Subfamily: Coelopinae
- Tribe: Coelopini; Hendel, 1910

Tribe of flies

Coelopini is a tribe of kelp flies in the family Coelopidae.

== Genera ==
- Genus Coelopa Meigen, 1830
  - Subgenus Coelopa Meigen, 1830
  - Subgenus Fucomyia Haliday, 1837
  - Subgenus Neocoelopa Malloch, 1933
