= Heterocheila hannai =

Scientific classification
- Domain: Eukaryota
- Kingdom: Animalia
- Phylum: Arthropoda
- Class: Insecta
- Order: Diptera
- Family: Heterocheilidae
- Genus: Heterocheila
- Species: H. hannai

Binomial name
- Heterocheila hannai (Cole, 1921)

Synonyms
- Dryomyza hannai Cole, 1921; Heterochelia nudiseta Curran, 1933

Species of fly

Heterocheila hannai is a species of fly in the family Heterocheilidae.
