= Helcomyza mirabilis =

Scientific classification
- Domain: Eukaryota
- Kingdom: Animalia
- Phylum: Arthropoda
- Class: Insecta
- Order: Diptera
- Family: Helcomyzidae
- Genus: Helcomyza
- Species: H. mirabilis

Binomial name
- Helcomyza mirabilis Melander, 1920

Species of fly

Helcomyza mirabilis is a species of fly in the family Helcomyzidae.
