= Amma (fly) =

Scientific classification
- Domain: Eukaryota
- Kingdom: Animalia
- Phylum: Arthropoda
- Class: Insecta
- Order: Diptera
- Family: Coelopidae
- Subfamily: Coelopinae
- Tribe: Coelopellini
- Genus: Amma; McAlpine, 1991

Type species
- Amma blancheae McAlpine, 1991

Genus of fly

Amma is a genus of kelp fly in the family Coelopidae.

== Species ==
- Amma blancheae McAlpine, 1991
