= Rhis (fly) =

Scientific classification
- Domain: Eukaryota
- Kingdom: Animalia
- Phylum: Arthropoda
- Class: Insecta
- Order: Diptera
- Family: Coelopidae
- Subfamily: Coelopinae
- Tribe: Coelopellini
- Genus: Rhis; McAlpine, 1991

Type species
- This whitleyi McAlpine, 1991

Genus of flies

Rhis is a genus of kelp fly in the family Coelopidae.

== Species ==
- Rhis popeae (McAlpine, 1991)
- Rhis whitleyi McAlpine, 1991
