= Coelopinae =

Scientific classification
- Kingdom: Animalia
- Phylum: Arthropoda
- Class: Insecta
- Order: Diptera
- Superfamily: Sciomyzoidea
- Family: Coelopidae
- Subfamily: Coelopinae; Hendel, 1910

Subfamily of flies

Coelopinae is a subfamily of kelp flies in the family Coelopidae.

== Classification ==
- Tribe Coelopini Hendel, 1910
  - Genus Coelopa Meigen, 1830
    - Subgenus Coelopa Meigen, 1830
    - Subgenus Fucomyia Haliday, 1837
    - Subgenus Neocoelopa Malloch, 1933
- Tribe Coelopellini McAlpine, 1991
  - Genus Amma Classification McAlpine, 1991
  - Genus Beaopterus Lamb, 1909
  - Genus Coelopella Malloch, 1933
  - Genus Icaridion Lamb, 1909Halteres absent and the wings are reduced to strips. New Zealand.
  - Genus Rhis McAlpine, 1991
  - Genus This McAlpine, 1991
- Tribe Glumini McAlpine, 1991
  - Genus Chaetocoelopa Malloch, 1933
  - Genus Coelopina Malloch, 1933
  - Genus Dasycoelopa Malloch, 1933
  - Genus Gluma McAlpine, 1991
  - Genus Malacomyia Haliday in Westwood, 1840 (sometimes placed in Dryomyzidae)
