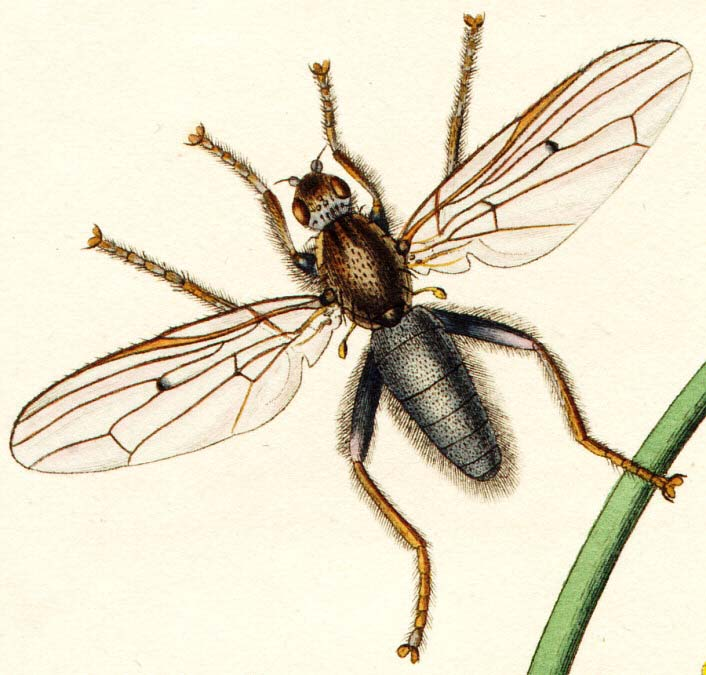
- Helcomyza ustulata illustration
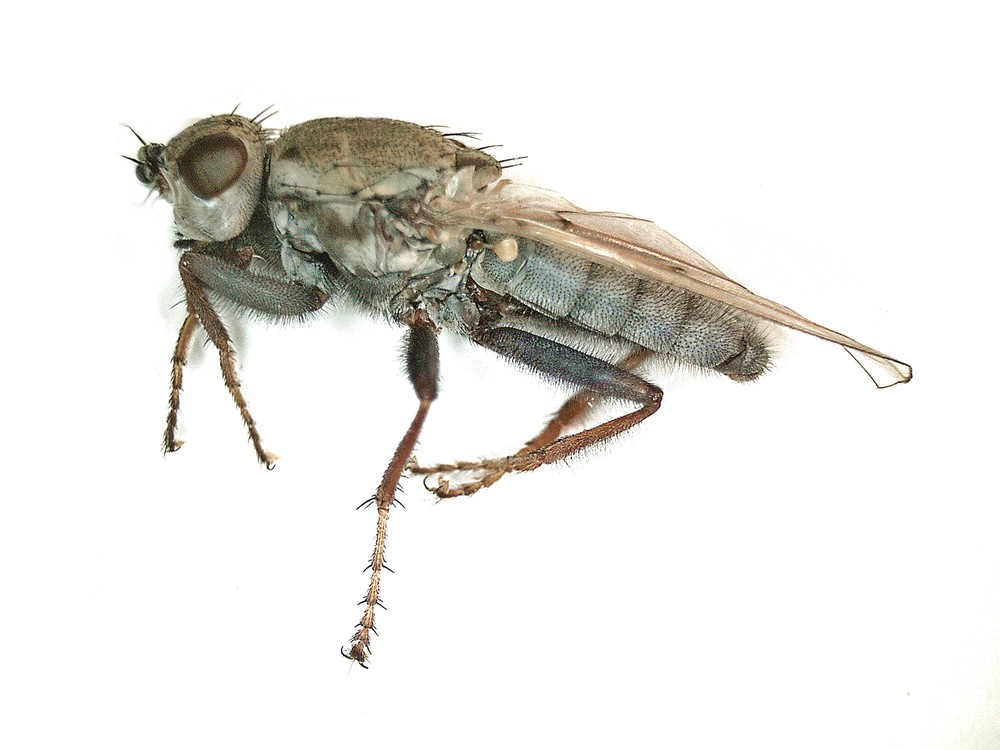
- Helcomyza ustulata specimen Netherlands

Scientific classification
- Kingdom: Animalia
- Phylum: Arthropoda
- Clade: Pancrustacea
- Class: Insecta
- Order: Diptera
- Superfamily: Sciomyzoidea
- Family: Helcomyzidae; Hendel, 1924

Genera
- See Text

= Helcomyzidae =

Family of flies

The Helcomyzidae are a small family of flies in the Acalyptratae. The larvae feed on kelp and other organic matter washed up on shorelines. Species diversity is highest in New Zealand and south temperate South America. They are sometimes allied with the families Dryomyzidae or Coelopidae.

== Classification ==
- Genus: Helcomyza Curtis, 1825

- Helcomyza mediterranea Loew, 1854
- Helcomyza mirabilis Melander, 1920
- Helcomyza ustulata Curtis, 1825

- Genus: Maorimyia Tonnoir & Malloch, 1928

- Maorimyia bipunctata (Hutton, 1901)

- Genus: Paractora Bigot, 1888

- Paractora angustata Malloch, 1933
- Paractora antarctica (Thomson, 1869)
- Paractora asymmetrica (Enderlein, 1930)
- Paractora bipunctata (Hutton, 1901)
- Paractora dreuxi Seguy, 1965
- Paractora jeanneli Seguy, 1940
- Paractora moseleyi (Austen, 1913)
- Paractora rufipes (Macquart, 1844)
- Paractora trichosterna (Thomson, 1869)
