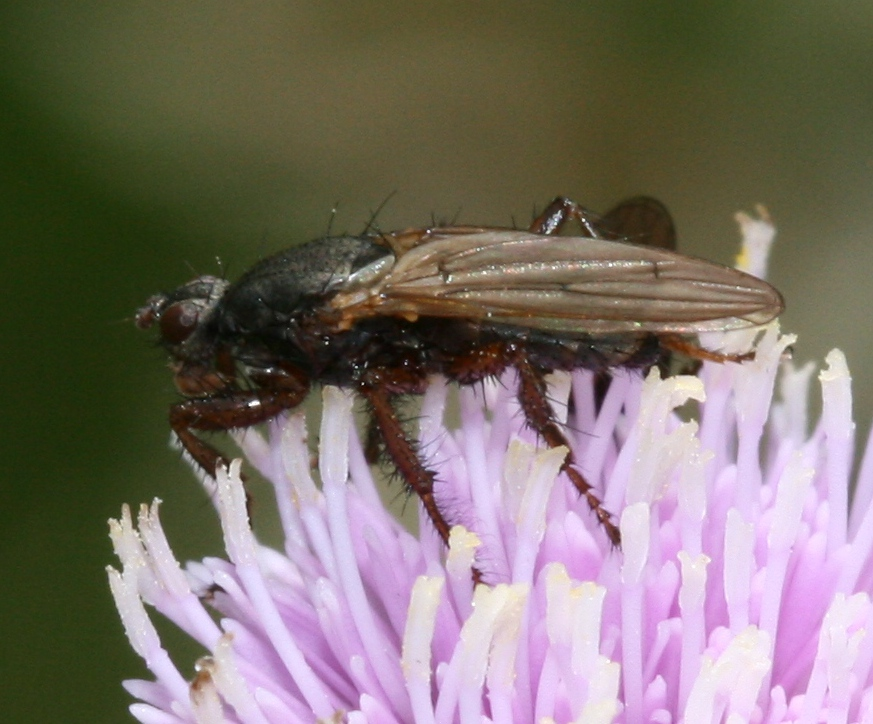

Scientific classification
- Kingdom: Animalia
- Phylum: Arthropoda
- Clade: Pancrustacea
- Class: Insecta
- Order: Diptera
- Superfamily: Sciomyzoidea
- Family: Coelopidae; Hendel, 1910

Type genus
- Coelopa Meigen, 1830

Synonyms
- Phycodromidae Loew, 1861; Phycodromiinae Lameere ,1906; Phycodromiidae Lundstrom & Frey, 1913; Malacomyiidae Czerny, 1909

= Coelopidae =

Seaweed or kelp flies

Family of flies

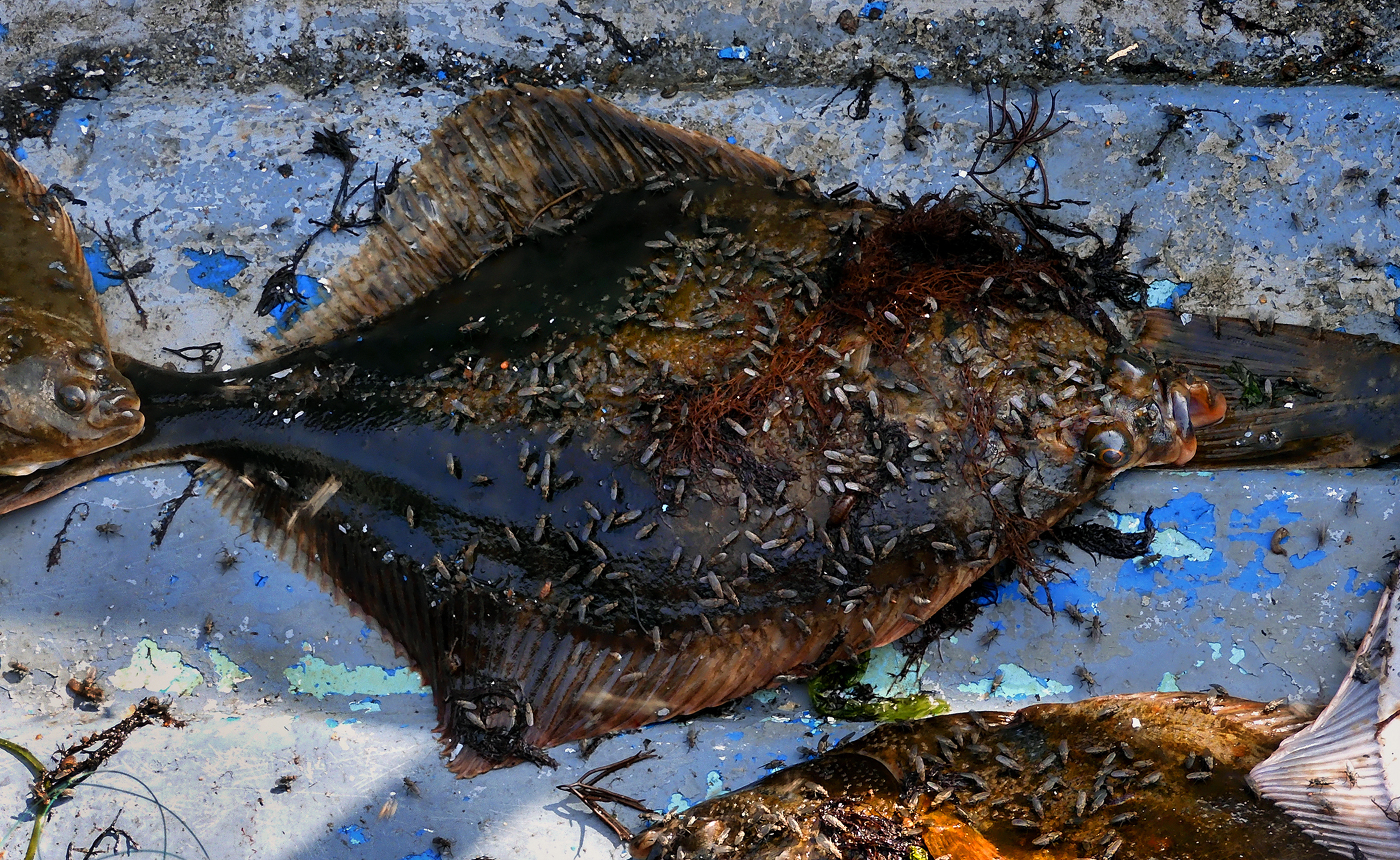
Kelp flies on a flatfish.

The Coelopidae or kelp flies are a family of Acalyptratae flies (order Diptera), they are sometimes also called seaweed flies, although both terms are used for a number of seashore Diptera. Fewer than 40 species occur worldwide. The family is found in temperate areas, with species occurring in the southern Afrotropical, Holarctic, and Australasian (which has the most species) regions.

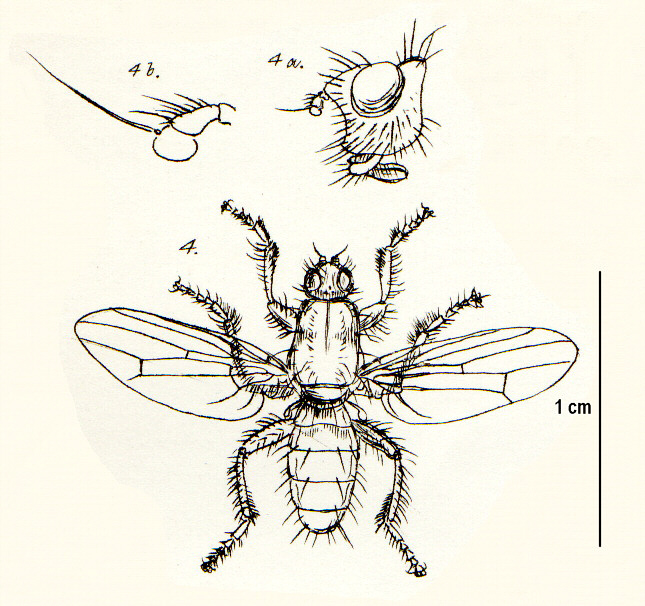
Coelopa frigida morphology

== Family characteristics ==
Coelopids are small to medium-sized (2.5–9 mm (0.098–0.35 in), usually 4–7 mm (0.16–0.28 in)), robust flies, predominantly with a flat body and darkly coloured. Coelopidae species are usually densely bristly or hairy. Their eyes are small. The arista is bare to pubescent. Ocelli and ocellar bristles are present. The postvertical bristles are parallel or converge. The two pairs of frontal bristles curve outward and scattered interfrontal setulae are present. Vibrissae are absent, but strong bristles occur near the vibrissal angle. The mesonotum is flat and the prothorax is separated from the propleuron by a membrane. The legs bear strong bristles and soft, dense hairs and the tibiae have subapical bristles. The wing is unmarked. The costa is entire, without interruptions. The subcosta is complete, crossvein BM-Cu is present, and the anal cell (cell cup) is closed. Legs usually densely hairy.

== Biology ==
Coelopids are found in the wrack zone of temperate seashores where the larvae feed on rotting seaweed. They are sometimes very abundant in this habitat. They go through several generations a year. The females lay their eggs in small batches into fresh alga banks. Three larval instars occur. Larvae feed in a bacteria-laden mass. Pupation is seldom in the algal substrate that soon collapses, but more frequently in the highest sand layers. Larvae are also found in winter wrack heaps as bacteria raise temperatures to 20-30 °C even if the heap is superficially frozen. Larvae and pupae have numerous predators, including birds and the staphylinid Aleochara and suites of parasites confined to algal banks.

== Classification ==
As of 2011, following Mathis and McAlpine's taxonomy, Coelopidae consists of two subfamilies: Coelopinae, with three tribes, twelve genera, and twenty-eight species, and Lopinae, consisting of just one monospecific genus.

- Subfamily Coelopinae Hendel, 1910
  - Tribe Coelopini Hendel, 1910
    - Genus Coelopa Meigen, 1830
      - Subgenus Coelopa Meigen, 1830
      - Subgenus Fucomyia Haliday, 1837
      - Subgenus Neocoelopa Malloch, 1933
  - Tribe Coelopellini McAlpine, 1991
    - Genus Amma McAlpine, 1991
    - Genus Beaopterus Lamb, 1909
    - Genus Coelopella Malloch, 1933
    - Genus Icaridion Lamb, 1909 Halteres absent and the wings are reduced to strips. New Zealand.
    - Genus Rhis McAlpine, 1991
    - Genus This McAlpine, 1991
  - Tribe Glumini McAlpine, 1991
    - Genus Chaetocoelopa Malloch, 1933
    - Genus Coelopina Malloch, 1933
    - Genus Dasycoelopa Malloch, 1933
    - Genus Gluma McAlpine, 1991
    - Genus Malacomyia Haliday in Westwood, 1840 (sometimes placed in Dryomyzidae
- Subfamily Lopinae McAlpine, 1991
  - Genus Lopa McAlpine, 1991

== Other ==
Coelopa frigida (Fabricius) has been reared in the laboratory and used for genetic studies.

== See also ==
- Chaetocoelopa littoralis
