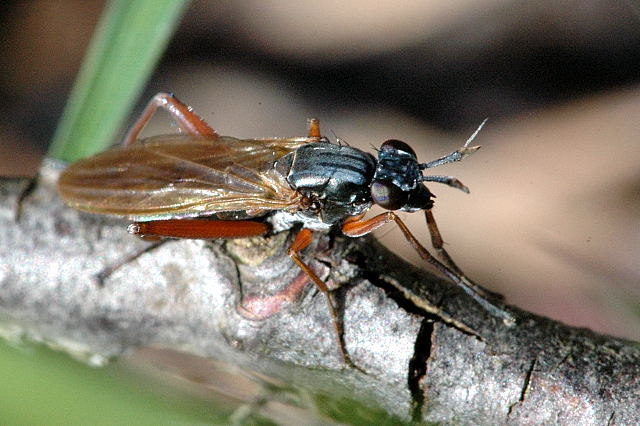
- Imago of Sepedon sphegea (Sciomyzidae)

Scientific classification
- Kingdom: Animalia
- Phylum: Arthropoda
- Clade: Pancrustacea
- Class: Insecta
- Order: Diptera
- Subsection: Acalyptratae
- Superfamily: Sciomyzoidea; Fallén, 1820

= Sciomyzoidea =

Superfamily of flies

Sciomyzoidea is a superfamily of Acalyptratae flies.

The families placed here include at least the following:

- Coelopidae – seaweed flies
- Dryomyzidae
- Helcomyzidae
- Helosciomyzidae
- Heterocheilidae
- Huttoninidae
- Natalimyzidae
- Phaeomyiidae
- Ropalomeridae
- Sciomyzidae – marsh flies, snail-killing flies (including Huttoninidae, Phaeomyiidae, Tetanoceridae)
- Sepsidae – scavenger flies
