= Kelp fly =

Various species of fly that feed on beached seaweed

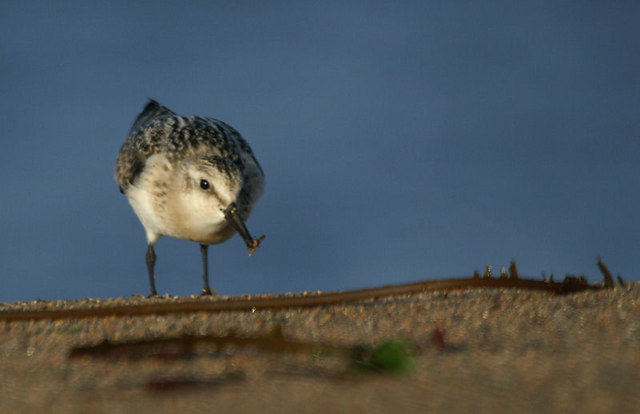
A sanderling (Calidris alba) feeding on a kelp fly

Kelp fly is one common name of species of flies in a number of families of "true flies" or Diptera. They generally feed on stranded and rotting seaweed in the wrack zone, particularly kelp. When conditions are suitable they are very numerous and may be ecologically important in the turnover of organic material on the coast. In that role, they also may be an important item in the diet of beach-dwelling animals and birds.

The flies most generally referred to as kelp flies are the widely distributed Coelopidae, such as Coelopa pilipes. In popular speech however, they are not clearly distinguished from other flies with similar feeding habits, such as the Heterocheilidae, the Helcomyzinae and sundry members of the Anthomyiidae.
