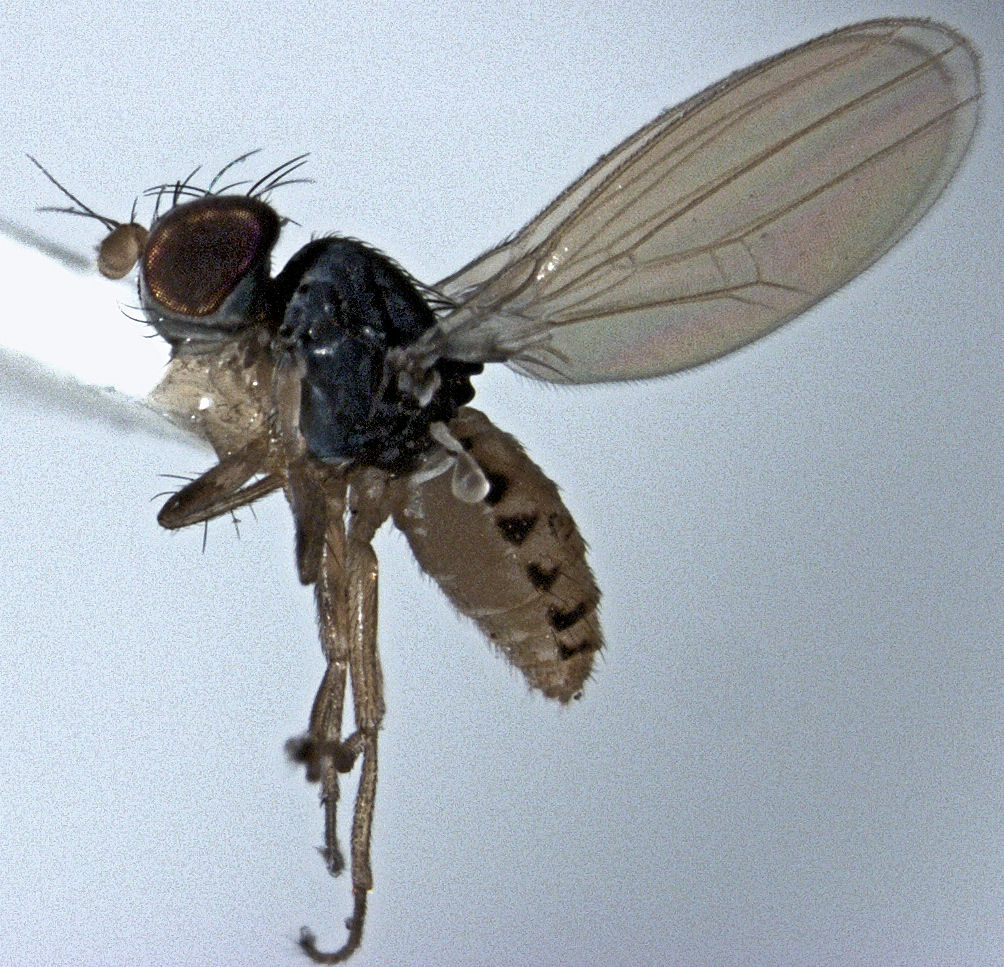
- Female specimen
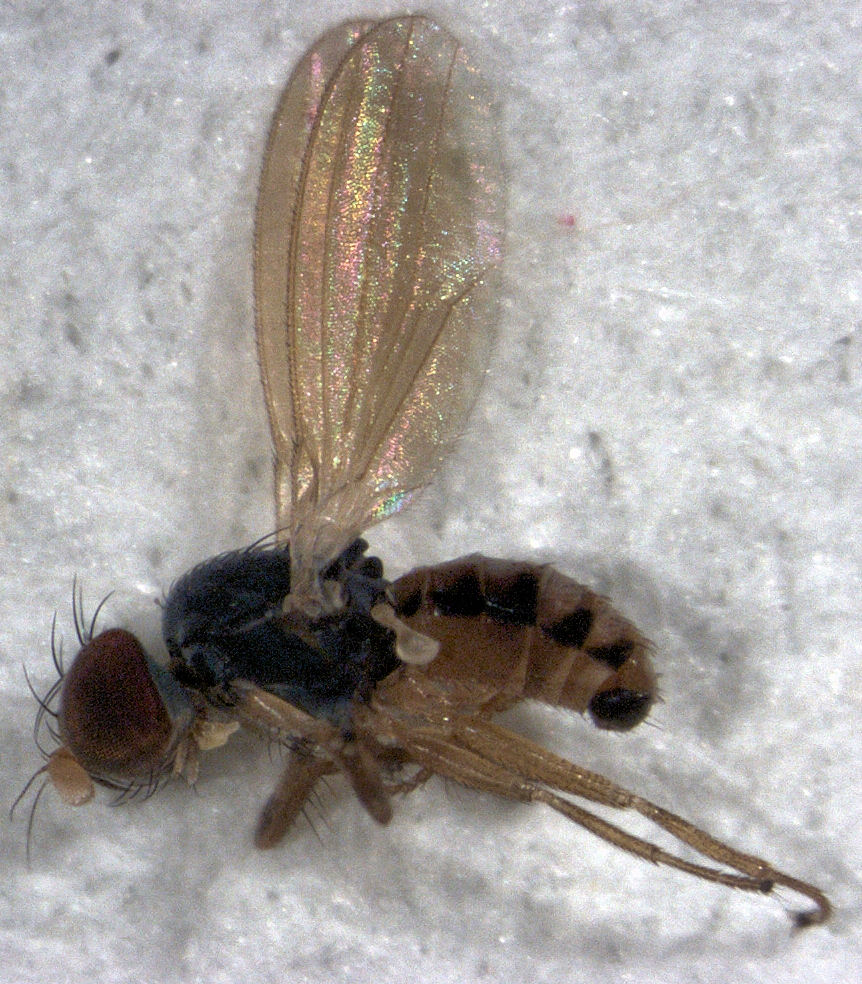
- Male specimen

Conservation status
- Naturally Uncommon (NZ TCS)

Scientific classification
- Kingdom: Animalia
- Phylum: Arthropoda
- Class: Insecta
- Order: Diptera
- Family: Anthomyzidae
- Genus: Zealantha
- Species: Z. thorpei

Binomial name
- Zealantha thorpei Roháček, 2007

= Zealantha thorpei =

Species of fly

Zealantha thorpei is a species of fly belonging to the family Anthomyzidae. First described by Jindřich Roháček in 2007, it is endemic to New Zealand and currently the only known member of Anthomyzidae found in the country.

== Taxonomy ==
The species was identified by Czech entomologist Jindřich Roháček in 2007, based on a holotype collected by Stephen E. Thorpe from Henderson Valley Scenic Reserve in West Auckland, New Zealand in December 2006. The earliest known specimen of the species dates to 1971. Thorpe collected the holotype from sedges found on a stream bank. Roháček named the species after Thorpe. Zealantha thorpei is the only known member of the family Anthomyzidae that had been found in New Zealand.

Zealantha is potentially a monotypic genus. Zealantha thorpei was the only member of the species in the genus until 2021, when another species found in Hokkaido, Japan, Z. fasciolata, was tentatively placed within Zealantha by Roháček due to morphological similarities, pending the discovery of males of the species.

== Description ==
Males of Z. thorpei have a total body length ranging between 2.02–2.35 mm (0.080–0.093 in), while females range between 2.08–2.94 mm (0.082–0.116 in). The species is bicoloured, with the head and thorax being a grey-black colour, and the abdomen and limbs coloured ochre-yellow. The species can be identified by its colours, by having dark velvet-like microtomentum on its head and thorax, and eyes covered in soft hairs.

== Distribution and habitat ==
The species is endemic to New Zealand, found primarily on the North Island and the northern South Island. Adults tend to be collected from between late November and January, and prefer damp littoral habitats dominated by sedges. Since its initial discovery, the species has been found to occur commonly in suburban Auckland.
