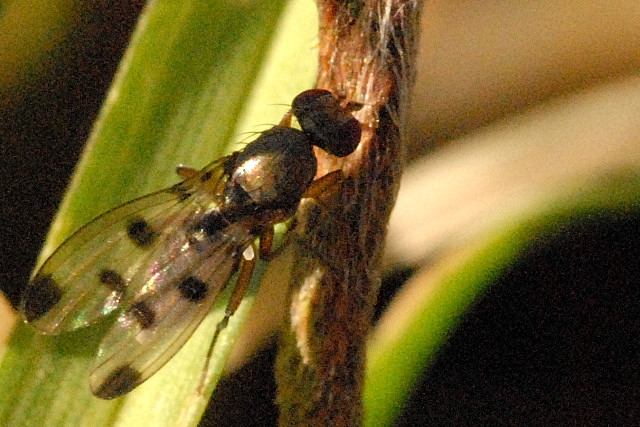
- Geomyza tripunctata

Scientific classification
- Domain: Eukaryota
- Kingdom: Animalia
- Phylum: Arthropoda
- Class: Insecta
- Order: Diptera
- Superfamily: Opomyzoidea
- Family: Opomyzidae

Genera
- Anomalochaeta Frey, 1910; Geomyza Fallén, 1810; Opomyza Fallén, 1820; Scelomyza Séguy, 1938

= Opomyzidae =

Family of flies

Opomyzidae is a family of acalyptrate Diptera. They are generally small, slender, yellow, brown or black coloured flies. The larval food plants are grasses, including cereal crops, the adults are mainly found in open habitats. Some species being agricultural pests.

Opomyza wing veins

== Description ==
For terms see Morphology of Diptera. Small slender yellow, brown, reddish or black flies. The narrow wings are usually with light or dark-colored spots (darkly marked crossveins apical spot). Head with one pair of backwardly directed orbital (frontal bristles) bristles. Scattered interfrontal setulae are present Ocellar bristles are present. Postvertical bristles are absent (rarely present). Vibrissae absent but Geomyza with a strong bristle near the vibrissal angle. Ocelli are present and the arista is pubescent or with long hairs. Tibae without preapical dorsal bristles. R1 is short, the subcosta ends near the break of the costa (usually incomplete but apical part sometimes visible as a faint line reaching the costa) and near apex of R1;posterior basal wing cell and anal cell are small. The crossvein BM-Cu is present but usually incomplete. Tibiae without dorsal preapical bristle.

== Species ==
- Genus Anomalochaeta Frey, 1910

- Anomalochaeta guttipennis (Zetterstedt, 1838)

- Genus Geomyza Fallén, 1810

Geomyza cf. hackmani

- Geomyza angustipennis Zetterstedt, 1847
- Geomyza apicalis (Meigen, 1830)
- Geomyza balachowskyi Mesnil, 1934
- Geomyza breviseta Czerny, 1928
- Geomyza hackmani Nartshuk, 1984
- Geomyza hendeli Czerny, 1928
- Geomyza majuscula (Loew, 1864)
- Geomyza nartshukae Carles-Tolrá, 1993
- Geomyza subnigra Drake, 1992
- Geomyza tripunctata Fallén, 1823
- Geomyza venusta (Meigen, 1830)

- Genus Opomyza Fallén, 1820

Opomyza germinationis

- Opomyza athamus (Séguy, 1928)
- Opomyza florum (Fabricius, 1794)
- Opomyza germinationis (Linnaeus, 1758 )
- Opomyza limbatus (Williston, 1886)
- Opomyza lineatopunctata von Roser, 1840
- Opomyza petrei Mesnil, 1934
- Opomyza punctata Haliday, 1833
- Opomyza punctella Fallén, 1820
- Opomyza townsendi (Williston, 1898)

- Genus Scelomyza Séguy, 1938

- Scelomyza hirticornis Séguy, 1938

== Biology ==
The larvae live in the stems of grasses, a few species being a pest in agriculture, for instance Opomyza florum, the Yellow Cereal fly. Damage caused by Opomyzidae to Gramineae is termed "dead heart".

== Identification ==
- E. Brunel, 1998 Family Opomyzidae. In: Papp, L. og Darvas, B. (red.): Contributions to a Manual of Palaearctic Diptera. 3: 259–266. Science Herald, Budapest
- Drake, C.M. 1993. A review of the British Opomyzidae. British Journal of Entomology and Natural History 6: 159–176.
- Hackman, W., 1958 The Opomyzidae (Dipt.) of Eastern Fennoscandia. Notulae Entomologicae 38 : 114–126.
- Czerny. 1930.Opomyzidae. In: Lindner, E. (Ed.). Die Fliegen der Paläarktischen Region 6, 1,54c, 1–15. Keys to Palaearctic species but now needs revision (in German).
- Séguy, E., 1934 Diptères: Brachycères. T.II. Muscidae acalypterae, Scatophagidae. Paris: Éditions Faune de France 28.BibliothequeVirtuelleNumerique pdf
- Stackelberg, A.A., 1988 Family Opomyzidae in Bei-Bienko, G. Ya, 1988 Keys to the insects of the European Part of the USSR Volume 5 (Diptera) Part 2 English edition. Keys to Palaearctic species but now needs revision.
- Przemysław Trojan, 1962 Odiniidae, Clusiidae, Anthomyzidae, Opomyzidae, Tethinidae in (series) Klucze do oznaczania owadów Polski, 28,54/58; Muchowki = Diptera, 54/58 Publisher Warszawa : Państwowe Wydawnictwo Naukowe

== Phylogeny ==
- Opomyzoidea
  - Clusioinea
    Clusiidae
  - - Agromyzoinea
      - Odiniidae
      - - Fergusoninidae
        - Agromyzidae
    - - Opomyzoinea
        Opomyzidae+Anthomyzidae
      - Asteioinea

== Gallery ==
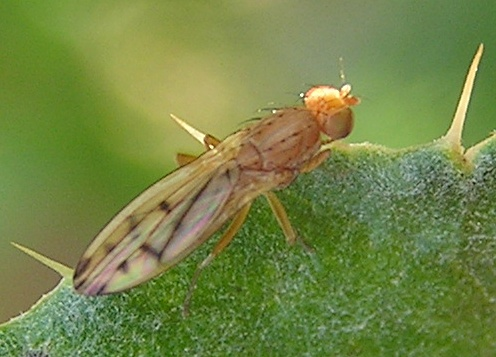
Opomyza florum
