= Ischnomyia spinosa =

Scientific classification
- Domain: Eukaryota
- Kingdom: Animalia
- Phylum: Arthropoda
- Class: Insecta
- Order: Diptera
- Family: Anthomyzidae
- Genus: Ischnomyia
- Species: I. spinosa

Binomial name
- Ischnomyia spinosa Hendel, 1911

Species of fly

Ischnomyia spinosa is a species of fly in the family Anthomyzidae.
