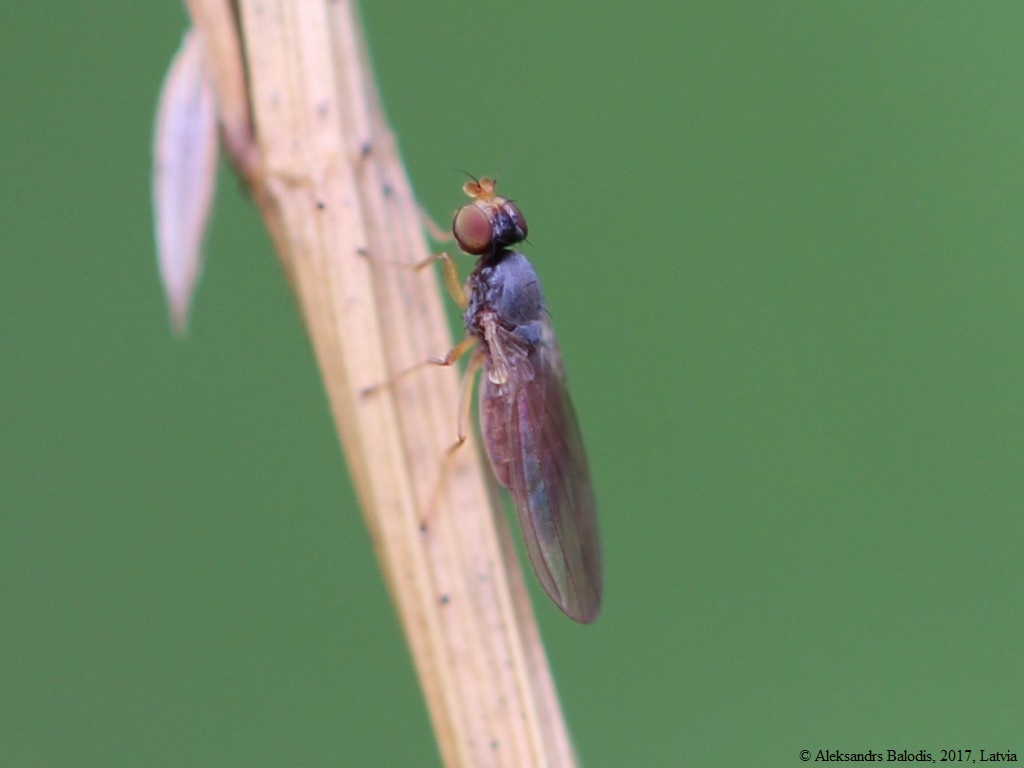

Scientific classification
- Kingdom: Animalia
- Phylum: Arthropoda
- Class: Insecta
- Order: Diptera
- Family: Anthomyzidae
- Genus: Anthomyza
- Species: A. gracilis

Binomial name
- Anthomyza gracilis Fallen, 1823

= Anthomyza gracilis =

Species of fly

Anthomyza gracilis is a species of fly in the family Anthomyzidae. It is found in the Palearctic.
