= Mumetopia occipitalis =

Scientific classification
- Domain: Eukaryota
- Kingdom: Animalia
- Phylum: Arthropoda
- Class: Insecta
- Order: Diptera
- Family: Anthomyzidae
- Genus: Mumetopia
- Species: M. occipitalis

Binomial name
- Mumetopia occipitalis Melander, 1913

Species of fly

Mumetopia occipitalis is a species of fly in the family Anthomyzidae.
