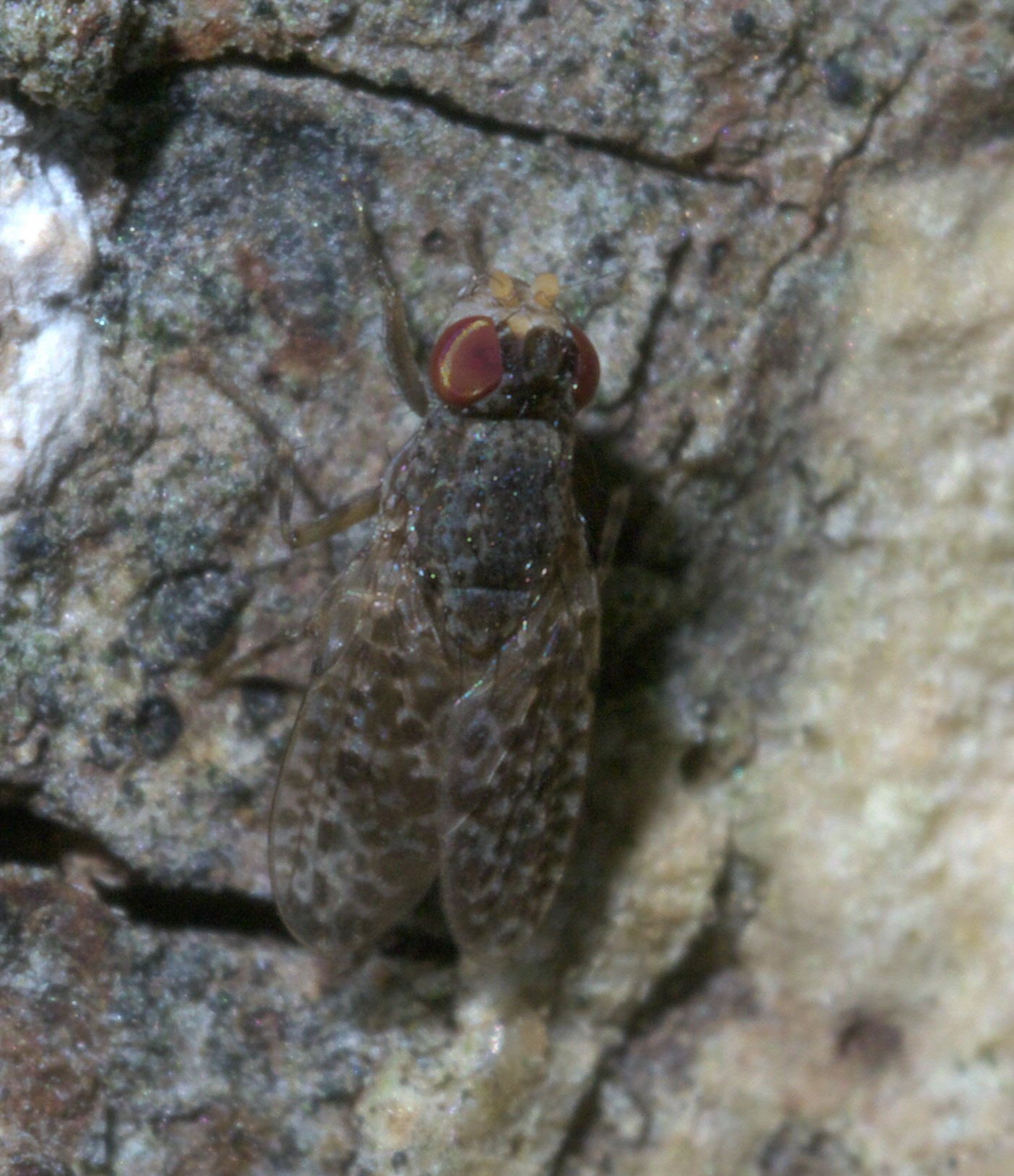

Scientific classification
- Domain: Eukaryota
- Kingdom: Animalia
- Phylum: Arthropoda
- Class: Insecta
- Order: Diptera
- Family: Odiniidae
- Genus: Traginops
- Species: T. irroratus

Binomial name
- Traginops irroratus Coquillett, 1900

= Traginops irroratus =

Species of fly

Traginops irroratus is a species of fly in the family Odiniidae.

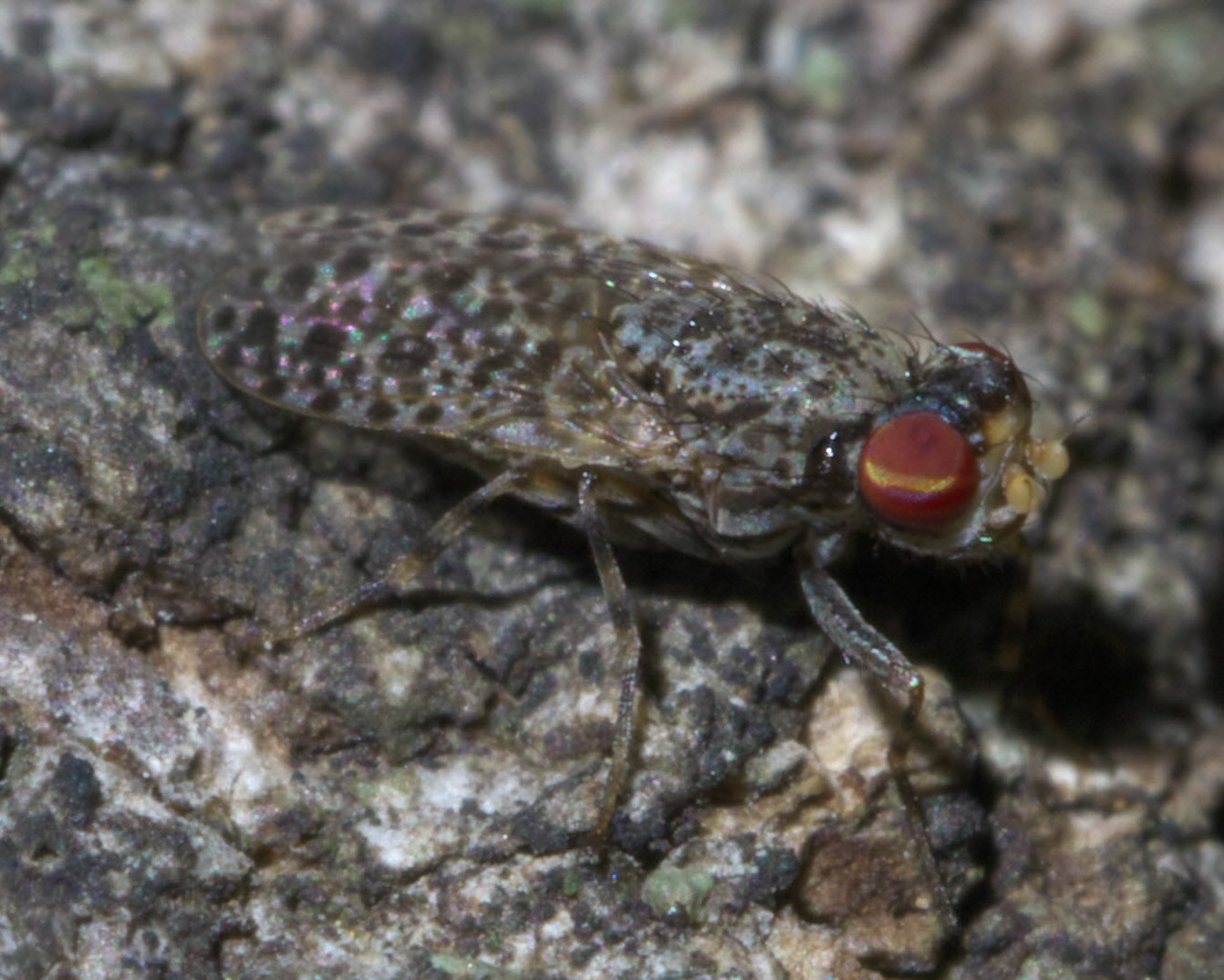
