= Odinia boletina =

Scientific classification
- Kingdom: Animalia
- Phylum: Arthropoda
- Class: Insecta
- Order: Diptera
- Family: Odiniidae
- Genus: Odinia
- Species: O. boletina

Binomial name
- Odinia boletina (Zetterstedt, 1848)

Species of fly

Odinia boletina is a species of fly in the family Odiniidae. It is found in the Palearctic.
