= Ischnomyia albicosta =

Scientific classification
- Kingdom: Animalia
- Phylum: Arthropoda
- Class: Insecta
- Order: Diptera
- Family: Anthomyzidae
- Genus: Ischnomyia
- Species: I. albicosta

Binomial name
- Ischnomyia albicosta (Walker, 1849)

Synonyms
- Diastata albicosta Walker, 1849; Ischnomyia vittula Loew, 1863; Tachydromia vittipennis Walker, 1857

Species of fly

Ischnomyia albicosta is a species of fly in the family Anthomyzidae.
