= Odinia conspicua =

Scientific classification
- Domain: Eukaryota
- Kingdom: Animalia
- Phylum: Arthropoda
- Class: Insecta
- Order: Diptera
- Family: Odiniidae
- Genus: Odinia
- Species: O. conspicua

Binomial name
- Odinia conspicua Sabrosky, 1959

Species of fly

Odinia conspicua is a species of fly in the family Odiniidae.
