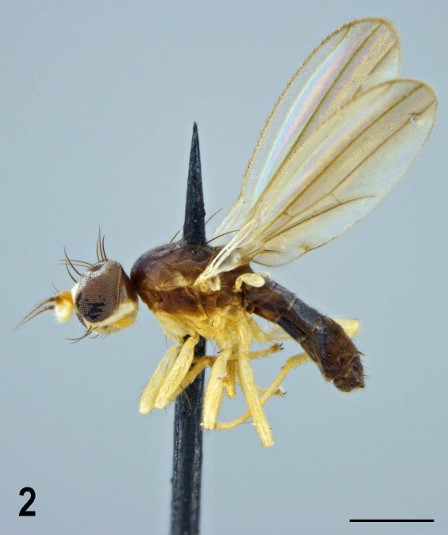
- Mumetopia

Scientific classification
- Kingdom: Animalia
- Phylum: Arthropoda
- Clade: Pancrustacea
- Class: Insecta
- Order: Diptera
- Family: Anthomyzidae
- Genus: Mumetopia; Melander, 1913

= Mumetopia =

Genus of flies

Mumetopia is a genus of flies in the family Anthomyzidae. There are at least four described species in Mumetopia.

== Species ==
These four species belong to the genus Mumetopia:

- Mumetopia nigrimana (Coquillett, 1900)
- Mumetopia occipitalis Melander, 1913
- Mumetopia taeniata Rohacek & Barber
- Mumetopia terminalis (Loew, 1863)
