= Ischnomyia =

Scientific classification
- Domain: Eukaryota
- Kingdom: Animalia
- Phylum: Arthropoda
- Class: Insecta
- Order: Diptera
- Family: Anthomyzidae
- Genus: Ischnomyia; Loew, 1863

Genus of flies

Ischnomyia is a genus of flies in the family Anthomyzidae. There are at least two described species in Ischnomyia.

== Species ==
These two species belong to the genus Ischnomyia:

- Ischnomyia albicosta (Walker, 1849)
- Ischnomyia spinosa Hendel, 1911
