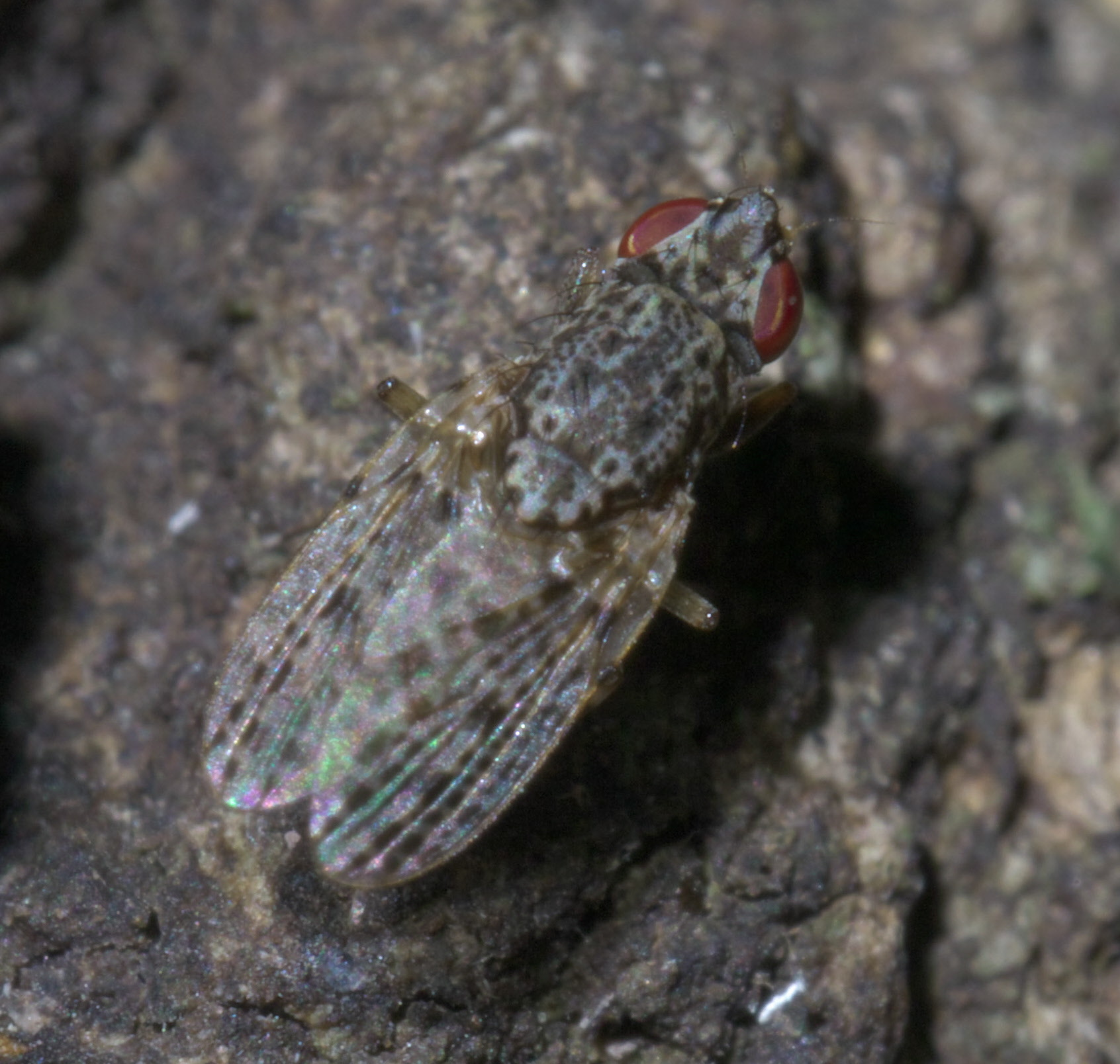

Scientific classification
- Domain: Eukaryota
- Kingdom: Animalia
- Phylum: Arthropoda
- Class: Insecta
- Order: Diptera
- Family: Odiniidae
- Subfamily: Traginopinae
- Genus: Traginops; Coquillett, 1900

= Traginops =

Genus of flies

Traginops is a genus of flies in the family Odiniidae. There are about seven described species in Traginops.

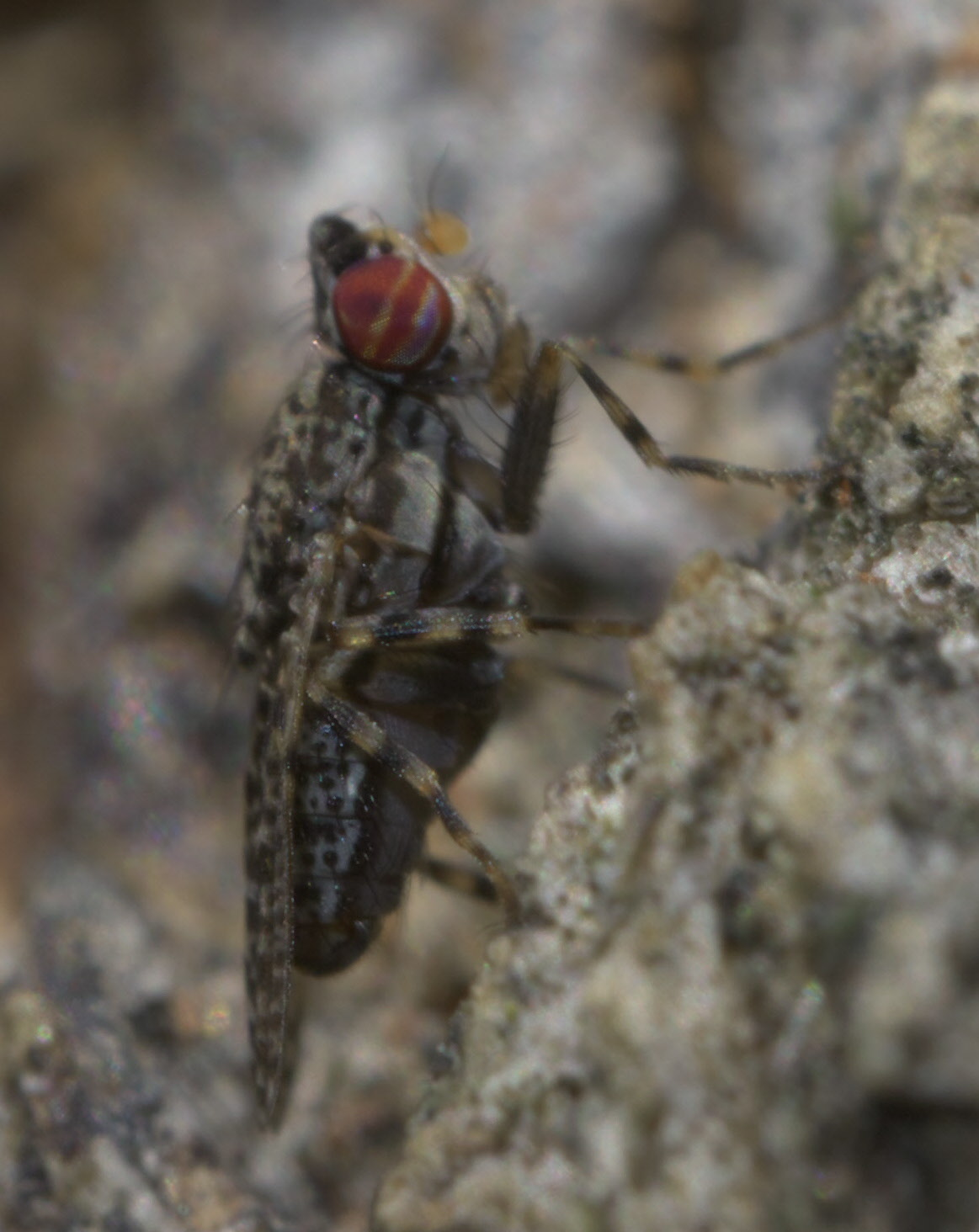

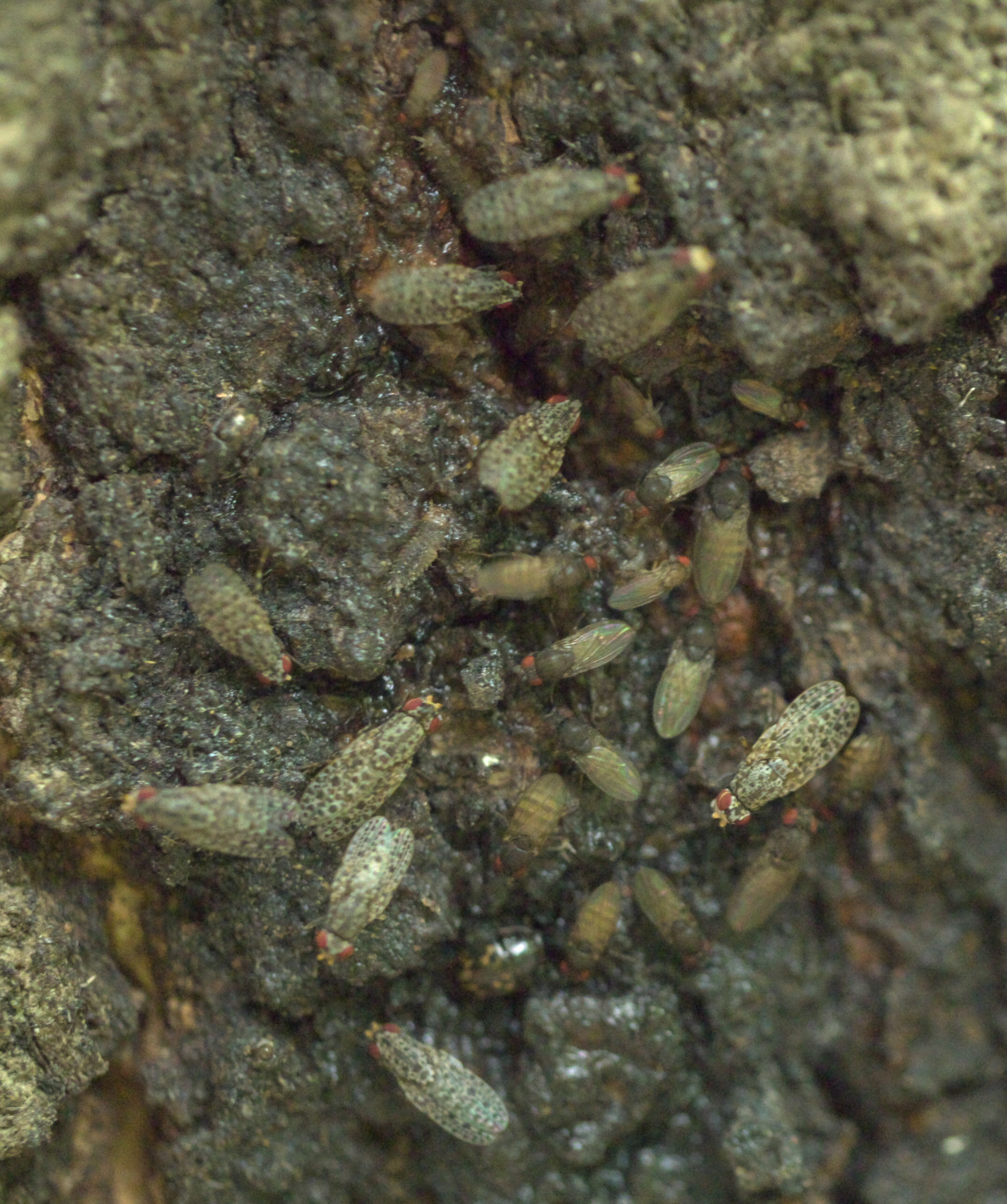

== Species ==
These seven species belong to the genus Traginops:

- Traginops irroratus Coquillett, 1900
- Traginops moremii Cogan, 1975
- Traginops naganensis Kato, 1952
- Traginops orientalis Meijere, 1911
- Traginops purpurops Steyskal, 1963
- Traginops ruwenzoricus Cogan, 1975
- Traginops shewelli Cogan, 1975
