= Anomalochaeta =

Scientific classification
- Kingdom: Animalia
- Phylum: Arthropoda
- Class: Insecta
- Order: Diptera
- Family: Opomyzidae
- Genus: Anomalochaeta; Frey, 1921

Genus of flies

Anomalochaeta is a genus of flies belonging to the family Opomyzidae.

The species of this genus are found in Europe.

Species:

- Anomalochaeta guttipennis (Zetterstedt, 1838)
