= Opomyza germinationis =

Scientific classification
- Kingdom: Animalia
- Phylum: Arthropoda
- Class: Insecta
- Order: Diptera
- Family: Opomyzidae
- Genus: Opomyza
- Species: O. germinationis

Binomial name
- Opomyza germinationis (Linnaeus, 1758)

Species of fly

Opomyza germinationis is a species of fly in the family Opomyzidae.

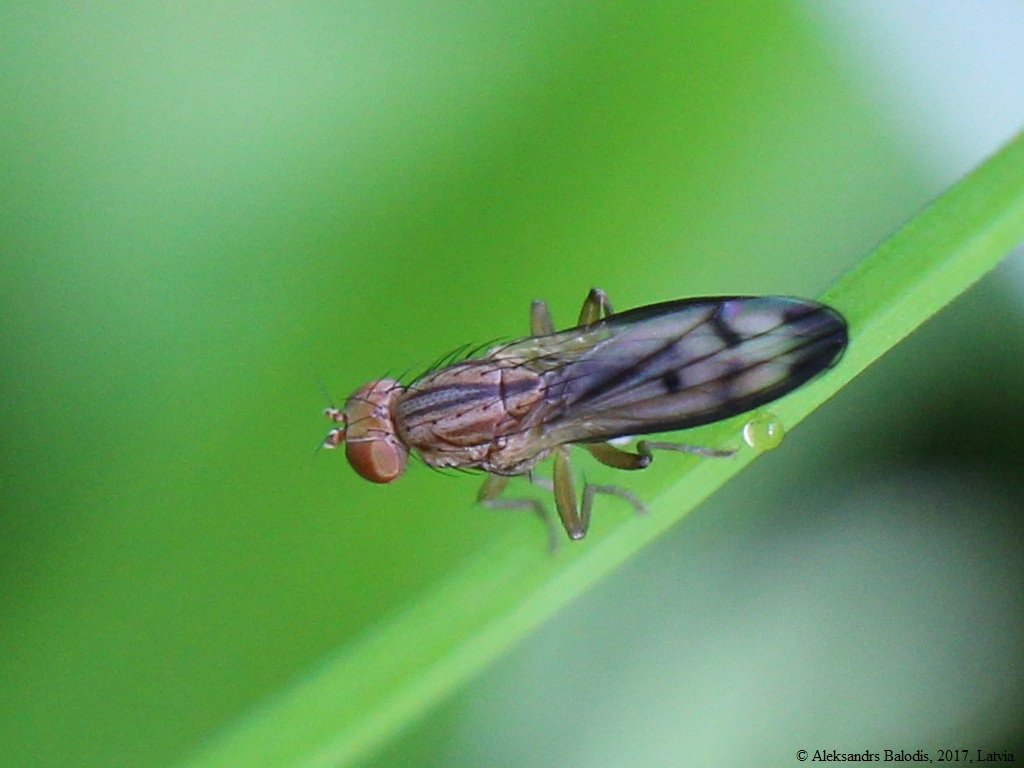
