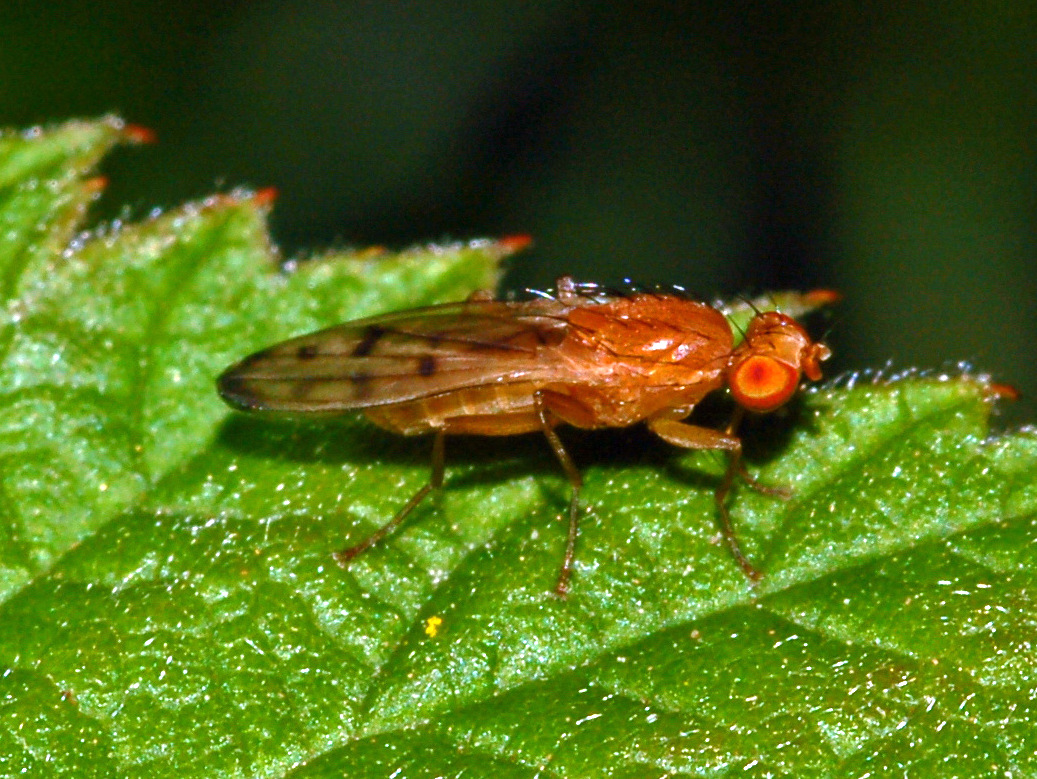
- Female of Opomyza florum

Scientific classification
- Kingdom: Animalia
- Phylum: Arthropoda
- Class: Insecta
- Order: Diptera
- Family: Opomyzidae
- Genus: Opomyza
- Species: O. florum

Binomial name
- Opomyza florum (Fabricius, 1794)

= Opomyza florum =

Species of fly

Female on leaves

Opomyza florum, common name yellow cereal fly or grass fly, is a species of acalyptrate flies.

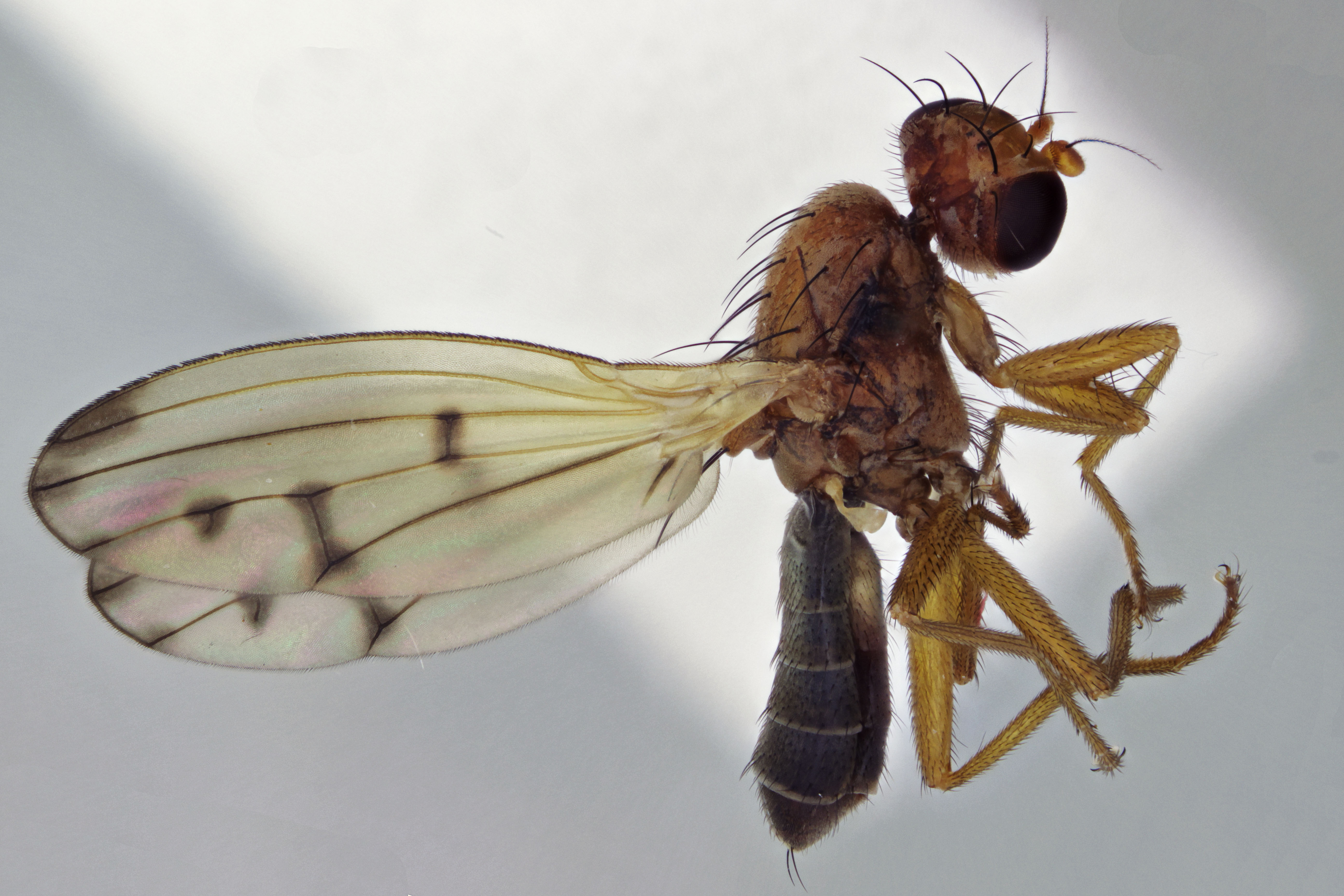

== Description and ecology ==
Opomyza florum can reach a length of 3.5–5 mm. These small flies are rusty-yellow coloured, with several dark setae on mesonotum and scutellum. Eyes are reddish. Wings are yellowish and transparent, with some smoky-brown spots. The larval main food plants are wild cereals, leguminous and cereal crops. Larvae are oligophagous stem borer, feeding on the stems of plants. They can be found in early spring while adults fly at the end of May–June until October. This species is an agricultural pest, damaging winter cereals such as wheat, barley and rye.

== Distribution ==
This species occurs in all of Europe.

== Habitat ==
It can be found in meadows and fields of cereal crops.
