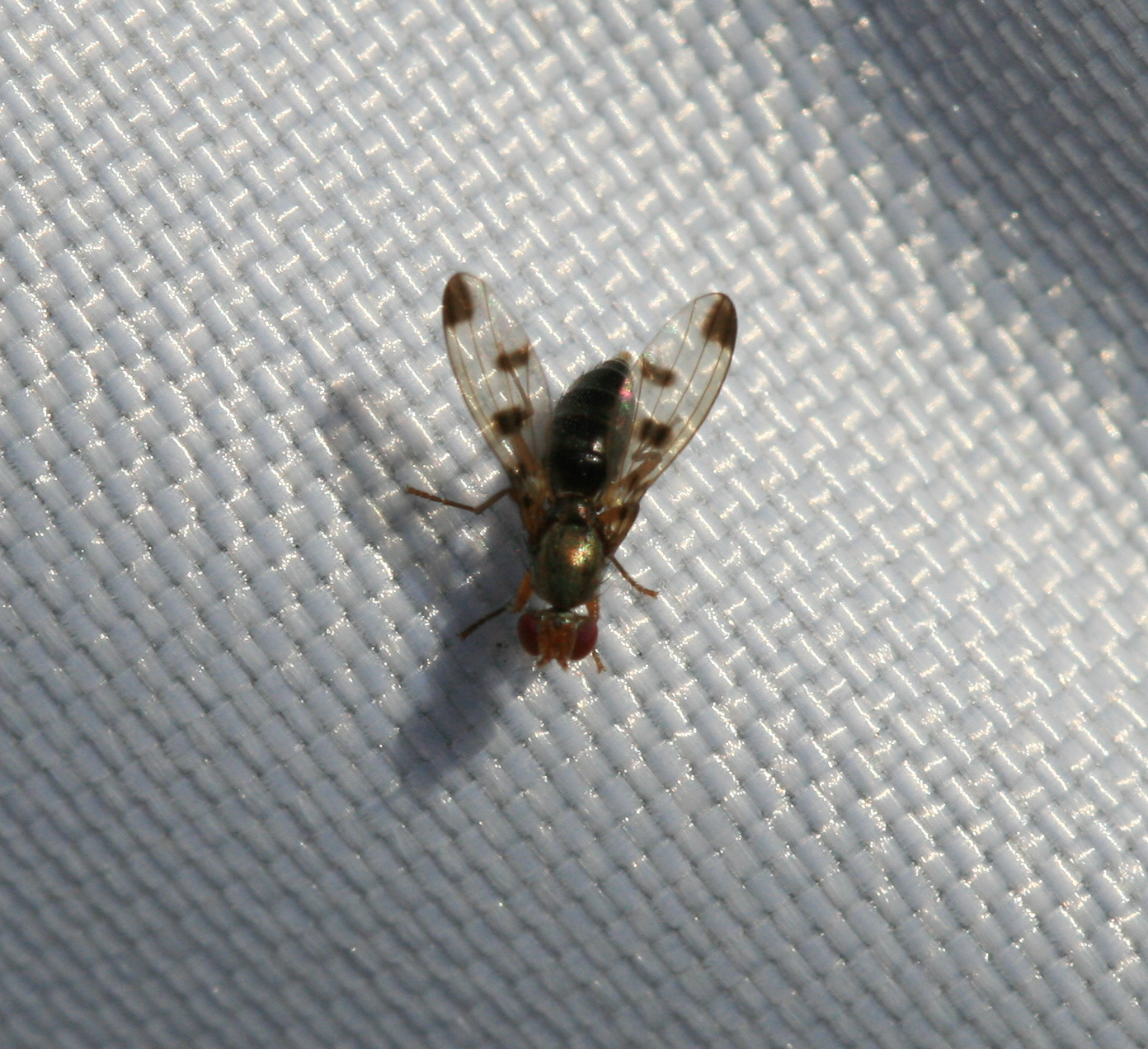

Scientific classification
- Kingdom: Animalia
- Phylum: Arthropoda
- Class: Insecta
- Order: Diptera
- Family: Opomyzidae
- Genus: Geomyza; Fallén, 1810

= Geomyza =

Genus of flies

Geomyza is a genus of flies in the family Opomyzidae. There are at least 30 described species in Geomyza.

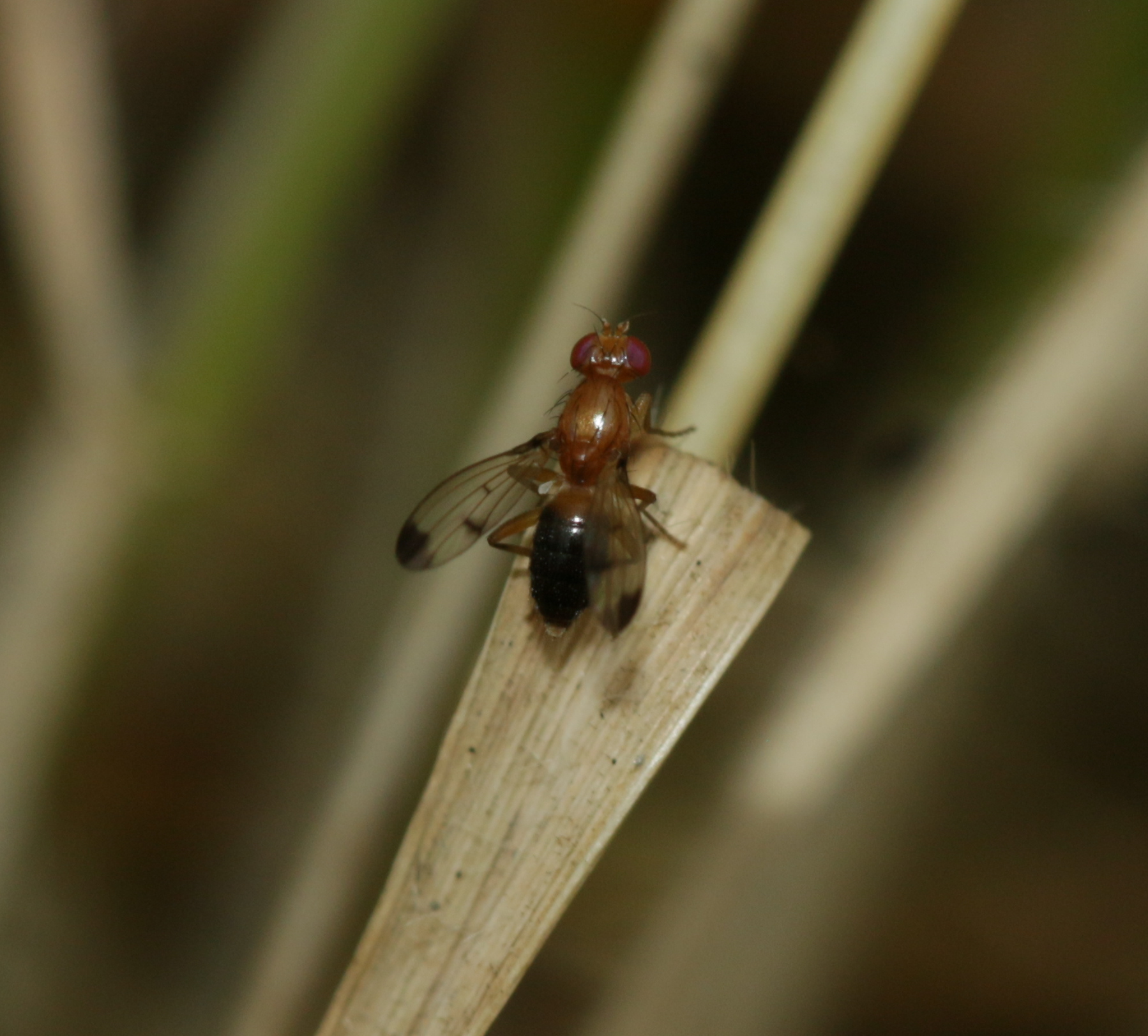

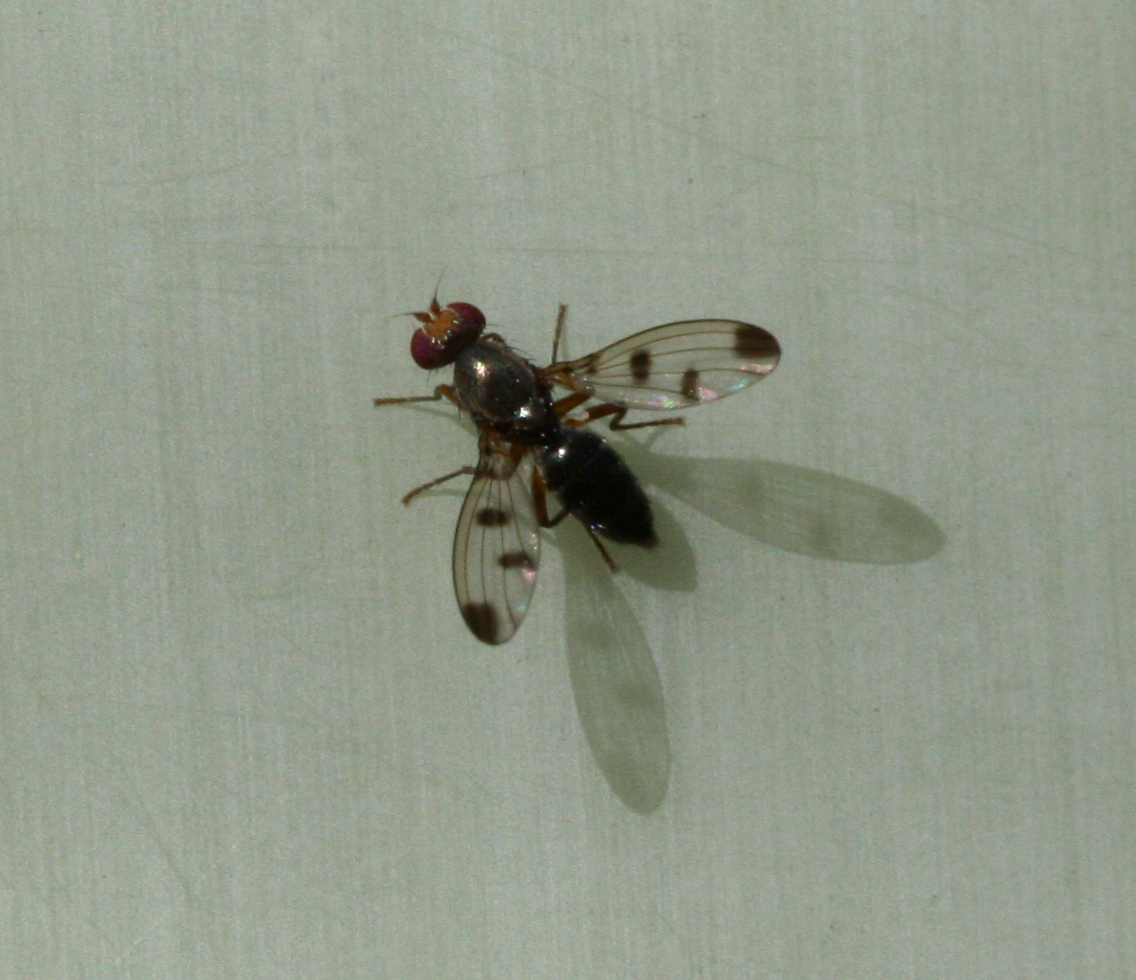

== Species ==
These 39 species belong to the genus Geomyza:

- Geomyza acutipennis Czerny, 1928^{c g}
- Geomyza adusta (Loew, 1873)^{c g}
- Geomyza advena Frey, 1960^{c g}
- Geomyza alluaudi (Hendel, 1917)^{c g}
- Geomyza angustipennis Zetterstedt, 1847^{c g}
- Geomyza annae Martinek, 1978^{c g}
- Geomyza apicalis (Meigen, 1830)^{c g}
- Geomyza balachowskyi Mesnil, 1934^{c g b}
- Geomyza bifida Carles-Tolra, 1993^{c g}
- Geomyza breviforceps Hackman, 1958^{c g}
- Geomyza breviseta Czerny, 1928^{c g}
- Geomyza chuana Yang, 1997^{c g}
- Geomyza combinata (Linnaeus, 1767)^{c g}
- Geomyza coquilletti (Hendel, 1917)^{c g}
- Geomyza denigrata Czerny, 1928^{c g}
- Geomyza dolomata Vockeroth, 1961^{c g}
- Geomyza elbergi Nartshuk, 1993^{c g}
- Geomyza envirata Vockeroth, 1965^{c g}
- Geomyza hackmani Nartshuk, 1984^{c g}
- Geomyza hissarica Nartshuk, 1993^{c g}
- Geomyza kazakhstanica Nartshuk, 1993^{c g}
- Geomyza lurida (Loew, 1864)^{c g}
- Geomyza majuscula (Loew, 1864)^{c g}
- Geomyza martineki Drake, 1992^{c g}
- Geomyza monticola Vockeroth, 1961^{c g}
- Geomyza nartshukae Carles-Tolra, 1993^{c g}
- Geomyza nubilipuncta Vockeroth, 1965^{c g}
- Geomyza opaca (Dahl, 1912)^{c g}
- Geomyza paganettii (Strobl, 1909)^{c g}
- Geomyza parvistigma Vockeroth, 1961^{c g}
- Geomyza pilosula Czerny, 1928^{c g}
- Geomyza silvatica Yang, 1995^{c g}
- Geomyza subnigra Drake, 1992^{c g}
- Geomyza tripunctata Fallen, 1823^{c g b} (cereal fly)
- Geomyza tundrarum Nartshuk, 1993^{c g}
- Geomyza velata Vockeroth, 1961^{c g}
- Geomyza venusta (Meigen, 1830)^{c g}
- Geomyza vespertina Vockeroth, 1961^{c g}
- Geomyza zumetae Carles-Tolra, 1995^{c g}

Data sources: i = ITIS, c = Catalogue of Life, g = GBIF, b = Bugguide.net
