= Stenomicridae =

Scientific classification
- Kingdom: Animalia
- Phylum: Arthropoda
- Class: Insecta
- Order: Diptera
- Superfamily: Opomyzoidea
- Family: Stenomicridae

Synonyms
- Stenomicrinae

Family of flies

Stenomicridae is a family of flies belonging to the order Diptera. Flies in this family are yellow in color and easily mistake for Cecidomyiidae. The family is found in Europe.

Small (approx. 1.5 – 2 mm), slender flies. In appearance, they may resemble reed flies (Anthomyzidae) or Periscelididae. The head is like that of Periscelididae, except that they have three, not two, bristles along the inner orbits of the compound eyes, and they have a distinct cheek brush (vibrissa).

== Genera ==
- Podocera Czerny, 1929
