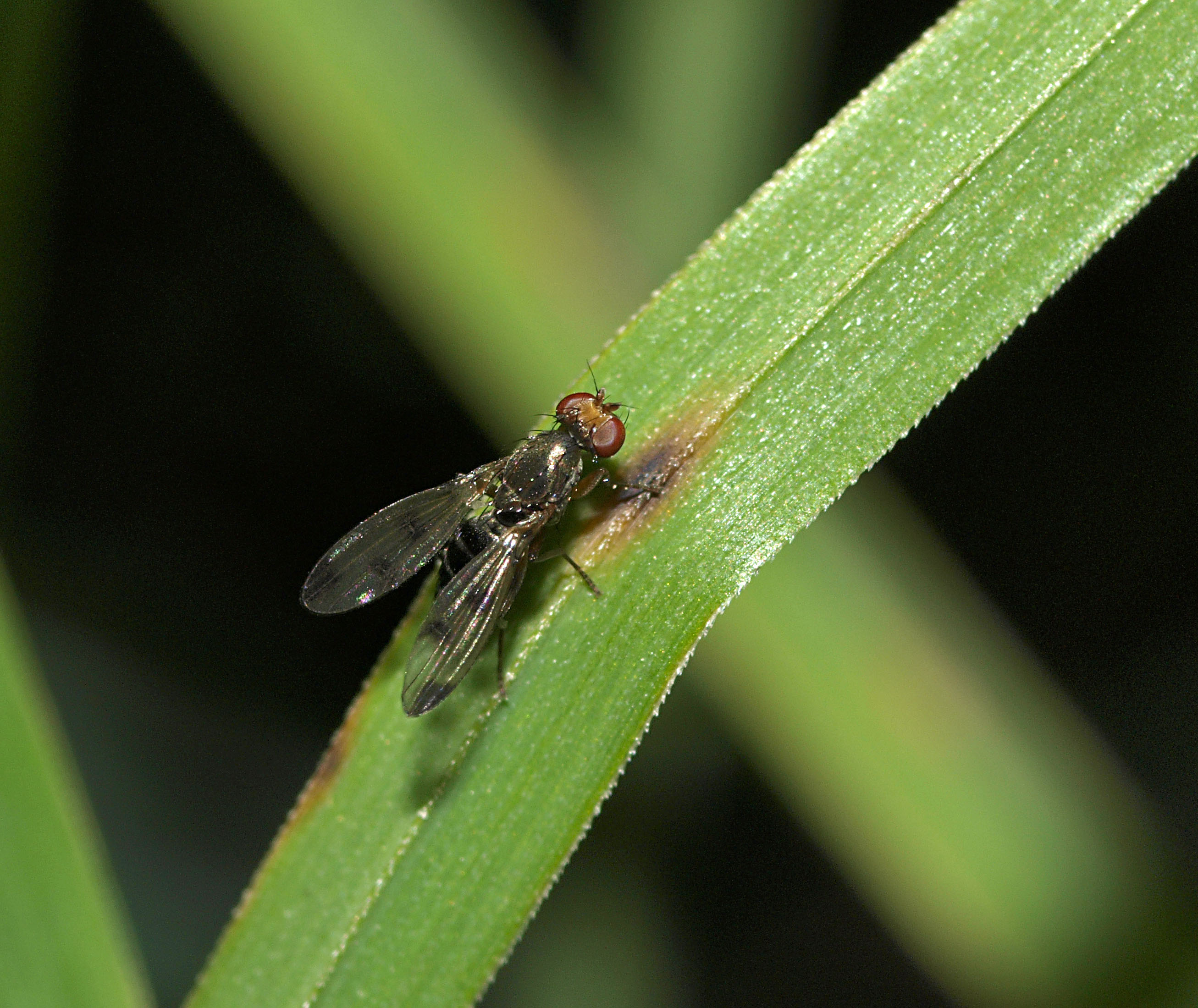
- Geomyza tripunctata Denmark

Scientific classification
- Kingdom: Animalia
- Phylum: Arthropoda
- Class: Insecta
- Order: Diptera
- Family: Opomyzidae
- Genus: Geomyza
- Species: G. tripunctata

Binomial name
- Geomyza tripunctata (Fallen, 1823)

= Geomyza tripunctata =

Species of fly

Geomyza tripunctata is a species of fly in the family Opomyzidae. It is found in the Palearctic.

Geomyza tripunctata Video

May to November. A herbicole found in grassland and cereal fields. Common throughout Europe. Norway and Lapland Siberia. Algeria.Tunisia. Found up to 2.300 m. The larvae tunnel in the stems of grasses and cereal.
