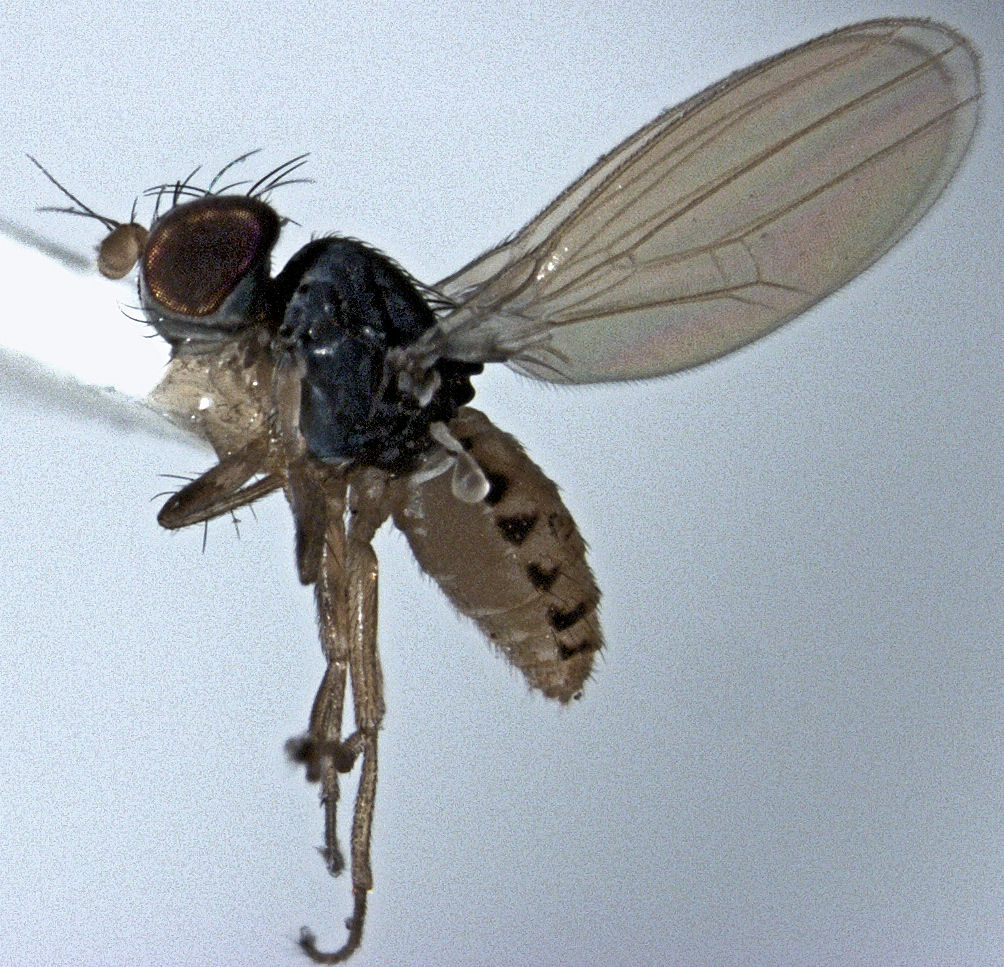
- Zealantha thorpei

Scientific classification
- Domain: Eukaryota
- Kingdom: Animalia
- Phylum: Arthropoda
- Class: Insecta
- Order: Diptera
- Family: Anthomyzidae
- Genus: Zealantha; Roháček, 2007

Species
- See text

= Zealantha =

Genus of fly

Zealantha is a genus of fly belonging to the family Anthomyzidae. The genus was described by Czech entomologist Jindřich Roháček in 2007.

== Taxonomy ==
Zealantha is potentially a monotypic genus. When Jindřich Roháček described the species in 2007, the only known member was the New Zealand species Zealantha thorpei, which also serves as the type species of the genus. The genus name Zealantha is a combination of New Zealand and Anthomyzidae.

In 2021, Roháček tentatively placed a novel species found in Hokkaido, Japan, Zealantha fasciolata, into the genus due to morphological similarities, pending the discovery of males of the species.

== Distribution ==
Members of the genus have been found in New Zealand and Japan.

== Species ==
- Zealantha thorpei Roháček, 2007
- Zealantha fasciolata Roháček, 2021
