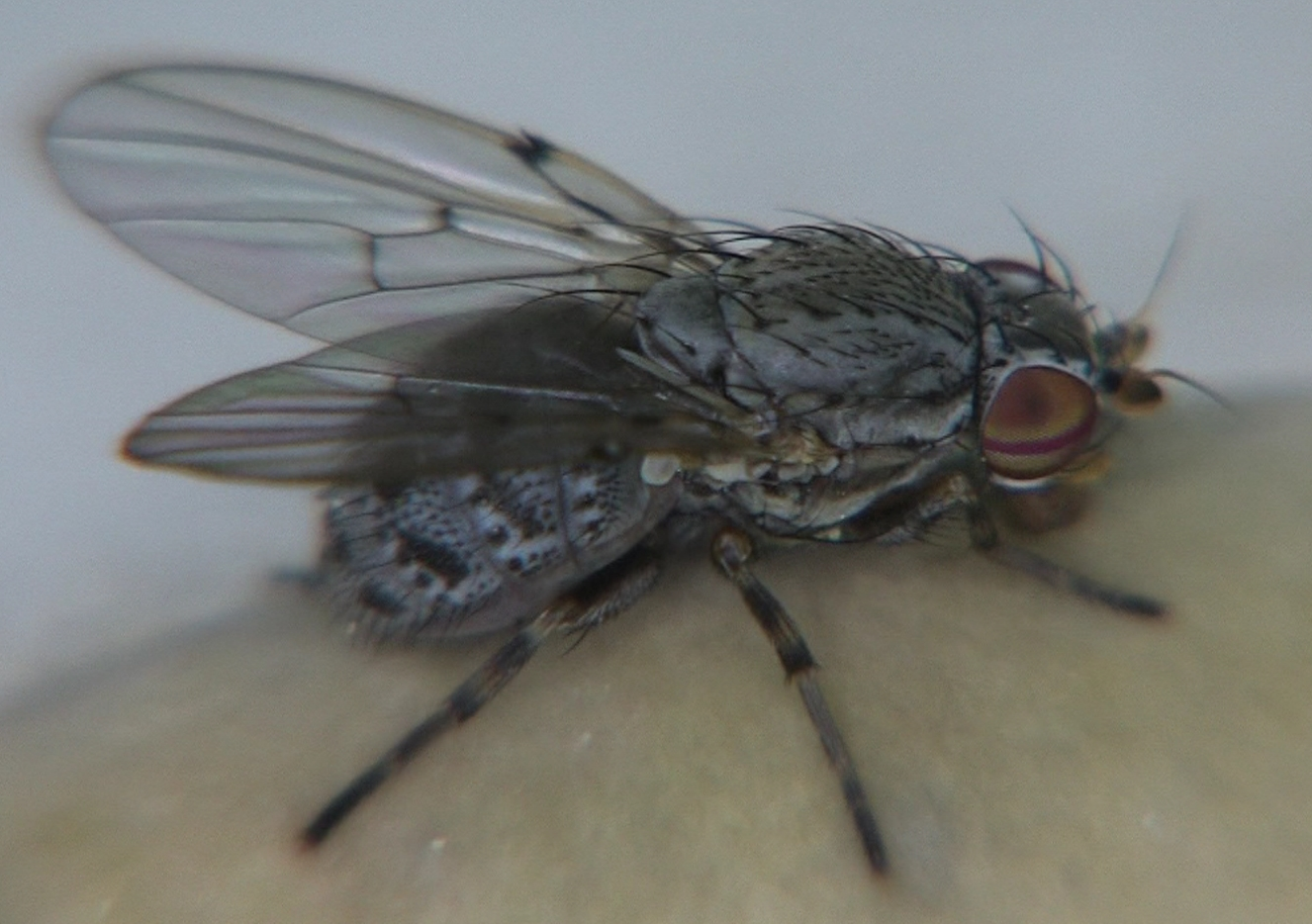
- Odinia boletina

Scientific classification
- Domain: Eukaryota
- Kingdom: Animalia
- Phylum: Arthropoda
- Class: Insecta
- Order: Diptera
- Family: Odiniidae
- Subfamily: Odiniinae
- Genus: Odinia; Robineau-Desvoidy, 1830

= Odinia =

Genus of flies

Odinia is a genus of flies in the family Odiniidae. There are more than 20 described species in Odinia.

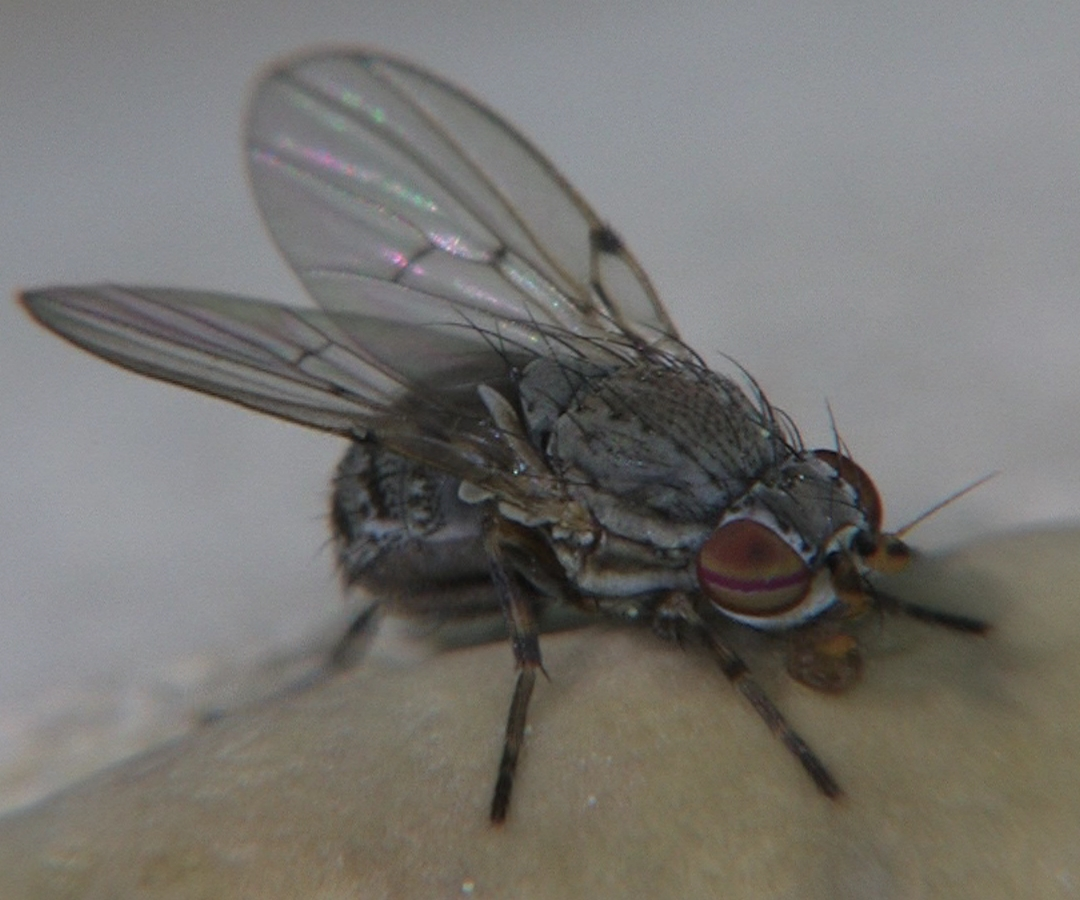
Odinia boletina

== Species ==
These 27 species belong to the genus Odinia:

- Odinia betulae Sabrosky, 1959
- Odinia biguttata Sabrosky, 1959
- Odinia boletina (Zetterstedt, 1848)
- Odinia brevitibia Shewell, 1960
- Odinia connecta Cogan, 1975
- Odinia conspicua Sabrosky, 1959
- Odinia coronata Sabrosky, 1959
- Odinia czernyi Collin, 1952
- Odinia foliata Krivosheina, 1979
- Odinia formosipennis Frey, 1961
- Odinia hendeli Collin, 1952
- Odinia loewi Collin, 1952
- Odinia maculata Meigen, 1830
- Odinia meijerei Collin, 1952
- Odinia ornata Zetterstedt, 1838
- Odinia parvipunctata Sabrosky, 1959
- Odinia peleterii (Robineau-Desvoidy, 1830)
- Odinia penrithorum Cogan, 1975
- Odinia photophila Papp, 1977
- Odinia picta (Loew, 1861)
- Odinia pomona Cogan, 1969
- Odinia rossi MacGowan & Rotheray, 2004
- Odinia surumuana Prado, 1973
- Odinia thaii Papp, 2006
- Odinia trifida Carles-Tolra, 1996
- Odinia williamsi Johnson, 1924
- Odinia xanthocera Collin, 1952
