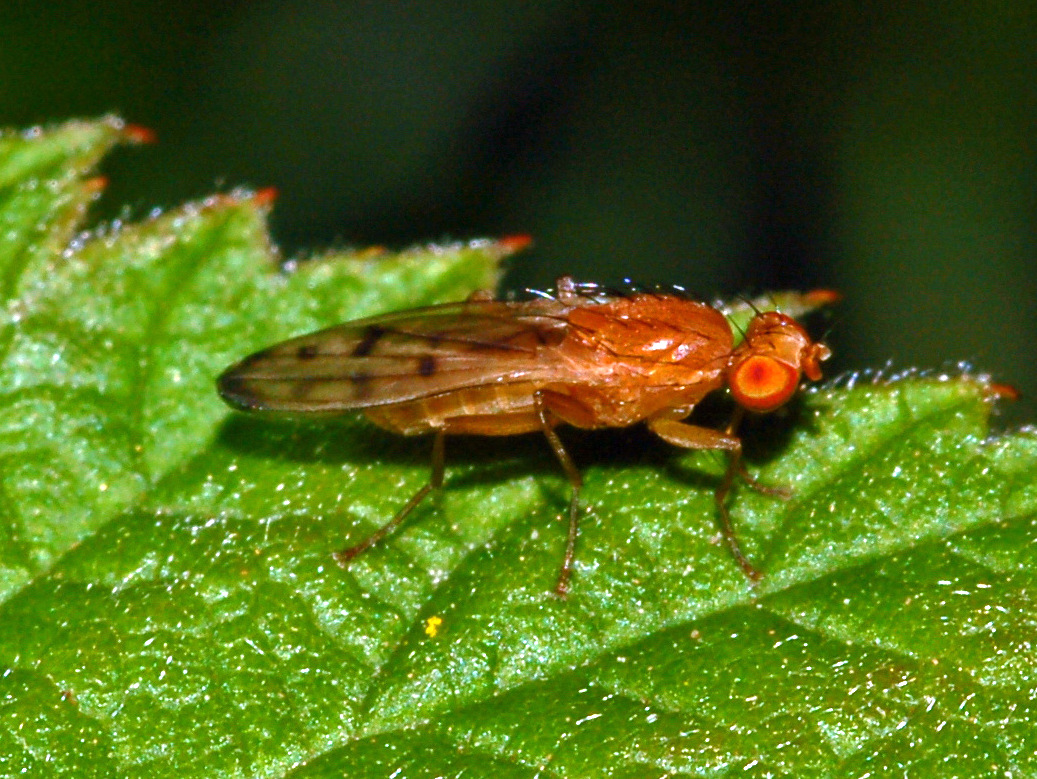
- Female of Opomyza florum

Scientific classification
- Domain: Eukaryota
- Kingdom: Animalia
- Phylum: Arthropoda
- Class: Insecta
- Order: Diptera
- Family: Opomyzidae
- Genus: Opomyza; Fallén, 1820

= Opomyza =

Genus of flies

Opomyza is a genus of acalyptrate flies.

== Species ==
- Opomyza aisae Carles-Tolrá, 1993
- Opomyza athamus (Séguy, 1928)
- Opomyza decora Oldenberg, 1910
- Opomyza florum (Fabricius, 1794)
- Opomyza germinationis (Linnaeus, 1758)
- Opomyza limbatus (Williston, 1886)
- Opomyza lineatopunctata von Roser, 1840
- Opomyza nigriventris Loew, 1865
- Opomyza petrei Mesnil, 1934
- Opomyza punctata Haliday, 1833
- Opomyza punctella Fallén, 1820
- Opomyza thalhammeri Strobl, 1900
- Opomyza townsendi (Williston, 1898)
