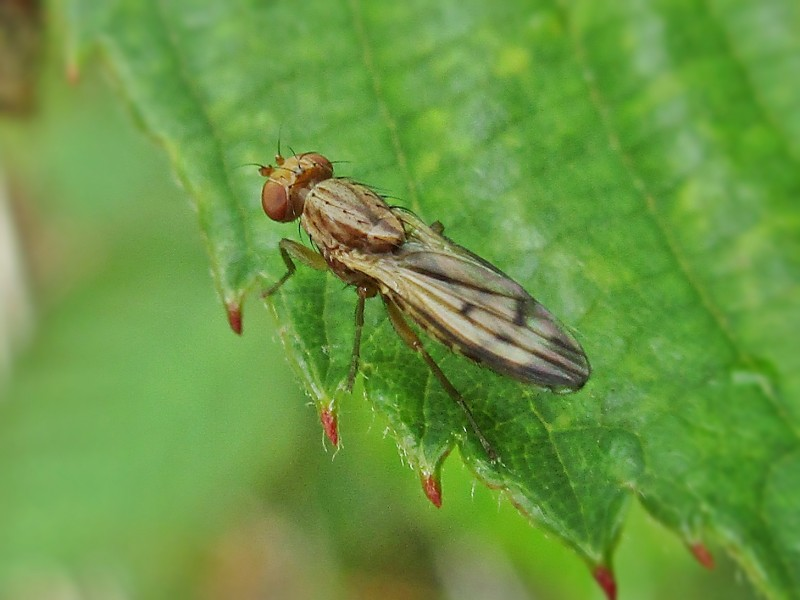
- Opomyza petrei Netherlands

Scientific classification
- Kingdom: Animalia
- Phylum: Arthropoda
- Class: Insecta
- Order: Diptera
- Family: Opomyzidae
- Genus: Opomyza
- Species: O. petrei

Binomial name
- Opomyza petrei Mesnil, 1934

= Opomyza petrei =

Species of fly

Opomyza petrei is a species of fly in the family Opomyzidae. It is found in the Palearctic.

A fly with a body length of 3–4 mm. Its head is yellow with white dust: face, cheeks, occiput and antennae. The antennae have a brown-black arista, one and a half times longer than the other segments combined. The body is yellow with a few brown stripes, dusted grey here and there. The legs, halteres and wing bases are yellow. The first radial cell of the wing is tinted brown in the section from the subcostal to the tip of the wing . The abdomen is yellow with three longitudinal, dark stripes running through the center and along the sides of the tergites. The abdominal pituitary glands are relatively short, angularly bent in the lateral view, with a blunt end, equipped with black hairs and spines . The female has a blunt ovipositor with almost symmetrical halves.

Content in this edit is translated from the existing Polish Wikipedia article at pl:Opomyza petrei; see its history for attribution
