= Anagnota =

Scientific classification
- Kingdom: Animalia
- Phylum: Arthropoda
- Clade: Pancrustacea
- Class: Insecta
- Order: Diptera
- Family: Anthomyzidae
- Genus: Anagnota

Species
- see text

Genus of flies

Anagnota is a genus of flies of the family Anthomyzidae. Currently there are four described species that occur in the Palaearctic region:

- A. bicolor (Meigen, 1838) Western, North and Central Europe, Russia (Western Siberia)
- A. coccinea Roháček & Freidberg, 1993 Cyprus, Israel, Turkey
- A. major Roháček & Freidberg, 1993 Central Europe, Southeast Europe, North Africa
- A. oriens Roháček, 2006 Russia (Siberia)
