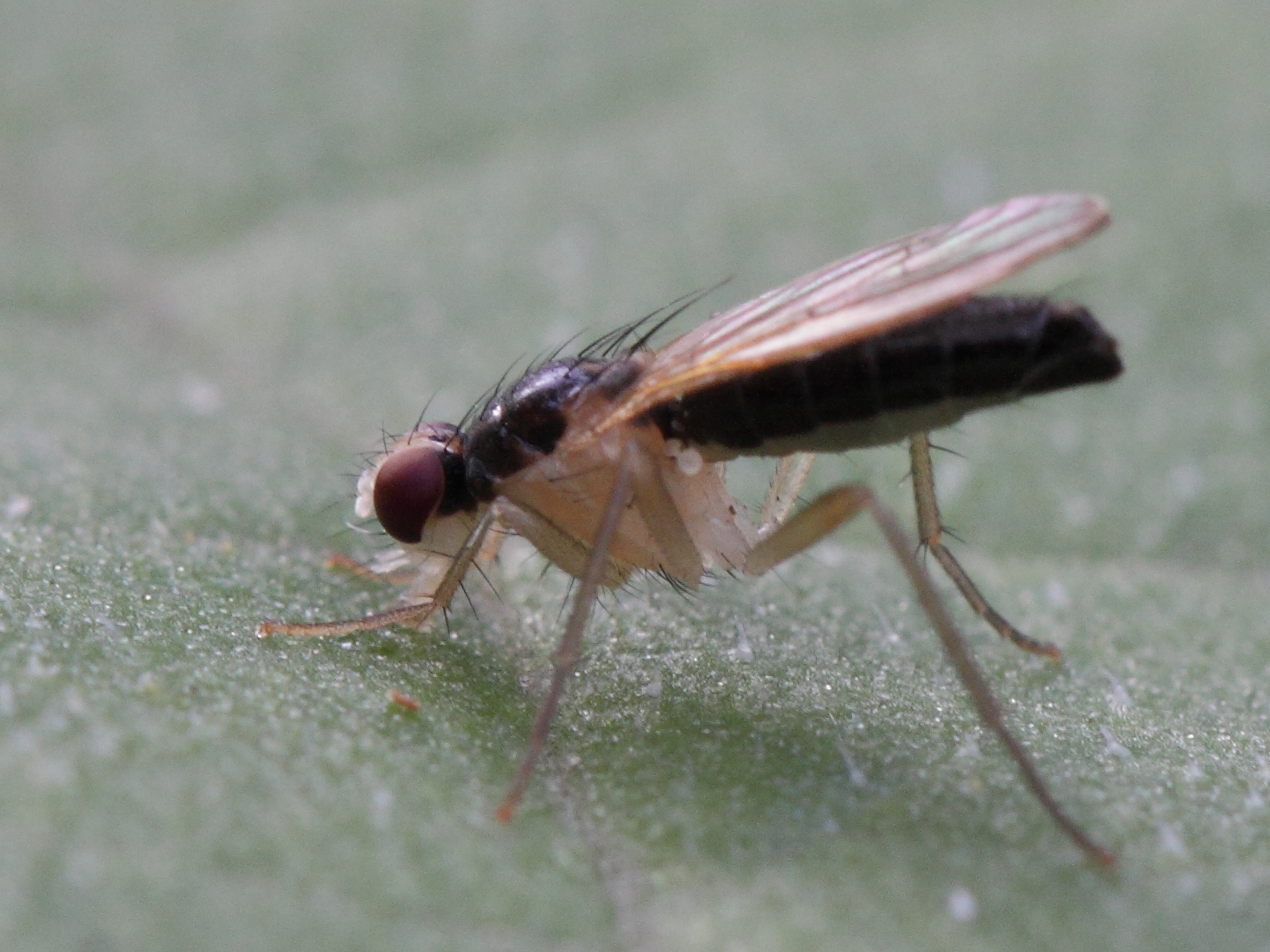

Scientific classification
- Kingdom: Animalia
- Phylum: Arthropoda
- Class: Insecta
- Order: Diptera
- Family: Anthomyzidae
- Genus: Anthomyza; Fallen, 1810

Synonyms
- Anthophilina Zetterstedt, 1837; Leptomyza Macquart, 1835

= Anthomyza =

Genus of flies

Anthomyza is a genus of flies in the family Anthomyzidae. It is found in the Palearctic.
