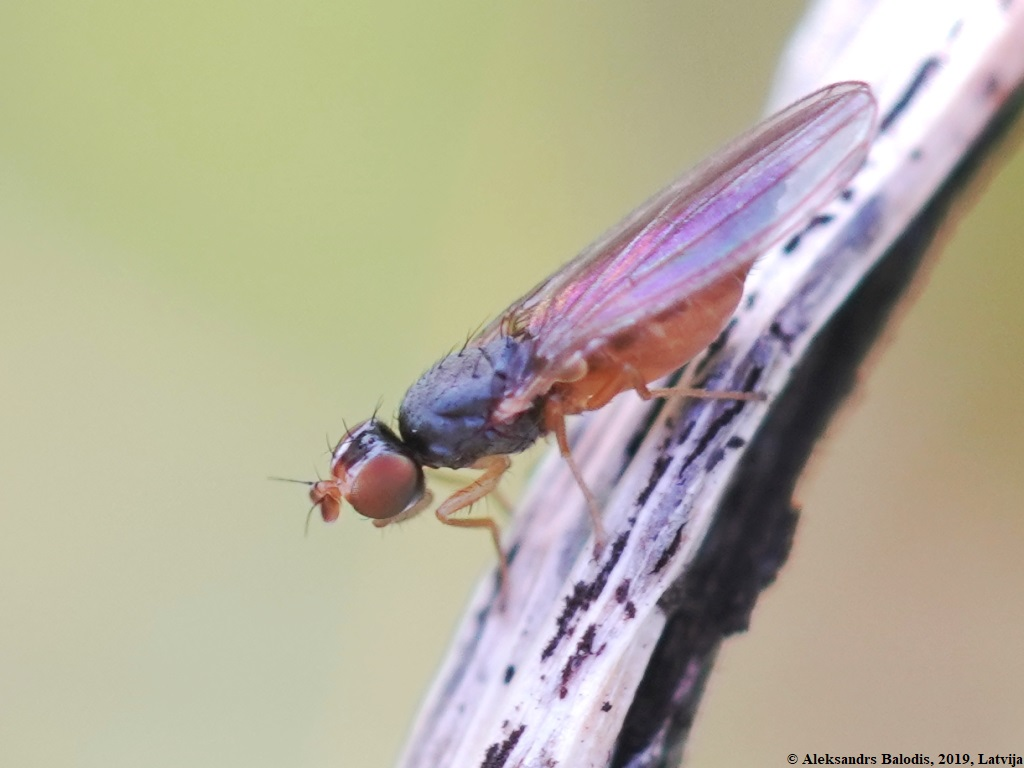
- Anthomyza gracilis

Scientific classification
- Kingdom: Animalia
- Phylum: Arthropoda
- Class: Insecta
- Order: Diptera
- Section: Schizophora
- Subsection: Acalyptratae
- Superfamily: Opomyzoidea
- Family: Anthomyzidae; Czerny, 1903

Genera
- See text

= Anthomyzidae =

Anthomyzidae Temporal range: Eocene–Recent

Family of flies

Anthomyzidae is a family of small, slender, yellow to black flies with narrow and elongated wings, which may have distinct markings. Some species have greatly reduced wings. Fewer than 100 species are known, mostly from Europe. Although they occur in all major regions, they seem to be most varied in the Holarctic region.

Around 20 diverse genera have been placed in the family. Two, Teratomyza and Teratoptera, are now in the Teratomyzidae, and Cyamops and Stenomicra are in the Stenomicridae. Melanthomyza Malloch from Chile should probably not be retained in the family. The remaining genera are very similar to one another.

== Description ==
Anthomyzidae wing veins

For terms see Morphology of Diptera

These are minute to small (1.3-4.5 mm), slender flies. They are yellow (sometimes with dark spots or stripes) to black in colour. The postverticals on the head are small, convergent or parallel, and rarely absent. Two or three pairs of frontal bristles, which curve backward, are present and usually preceded by one or more weaker bristles. Interfrontal bristles are absent or present. Peristomal bristles ("false vibrissae") are present. In the more common Anthomyza and Paranthomyza, the lower side of femur 1 has a well-developed spine in apical third. Wings are usually long and narrow and immaculate (sometimes marked). Some species are brachypterous. The costa has a subcostal break and the subcosta is incomplete.

== Biology ==
Anthomyza sp. ovipositing on an old (empty) head of grass

Larvae have been reported from decaying dicotyledonous plants, from fungi, and in Europe from leaf sheaths of various grasses and of Typha, Scirpus, and Juncus, from Lipara galls on Phragmites. They may be either phytophagous or saprophagous, but damage to cereals or other plants has not been reported.

Adults are usually found in moist habitats such as damp meadows, marshes, bogs, and damp deciduous or mixed forests with rich undergrowth. Some species inhabit dry grasslands (some species of Anthomyza and the brachypterous Stiphrosoma sabulosum).

== Phylogeny and taxa ==
- Opomyzoidea
  - Clusioinea
    Clusiidae
  - - Agromyzoinea
      - Odiniidae
      - - Fergusoninidae
        - Agromyzidae
    - - Opomyzoinea
        Opomyzidae+Anthomyzidae
      - Asteioinea

Lacrimyza lacrimosa in Baltic Amber

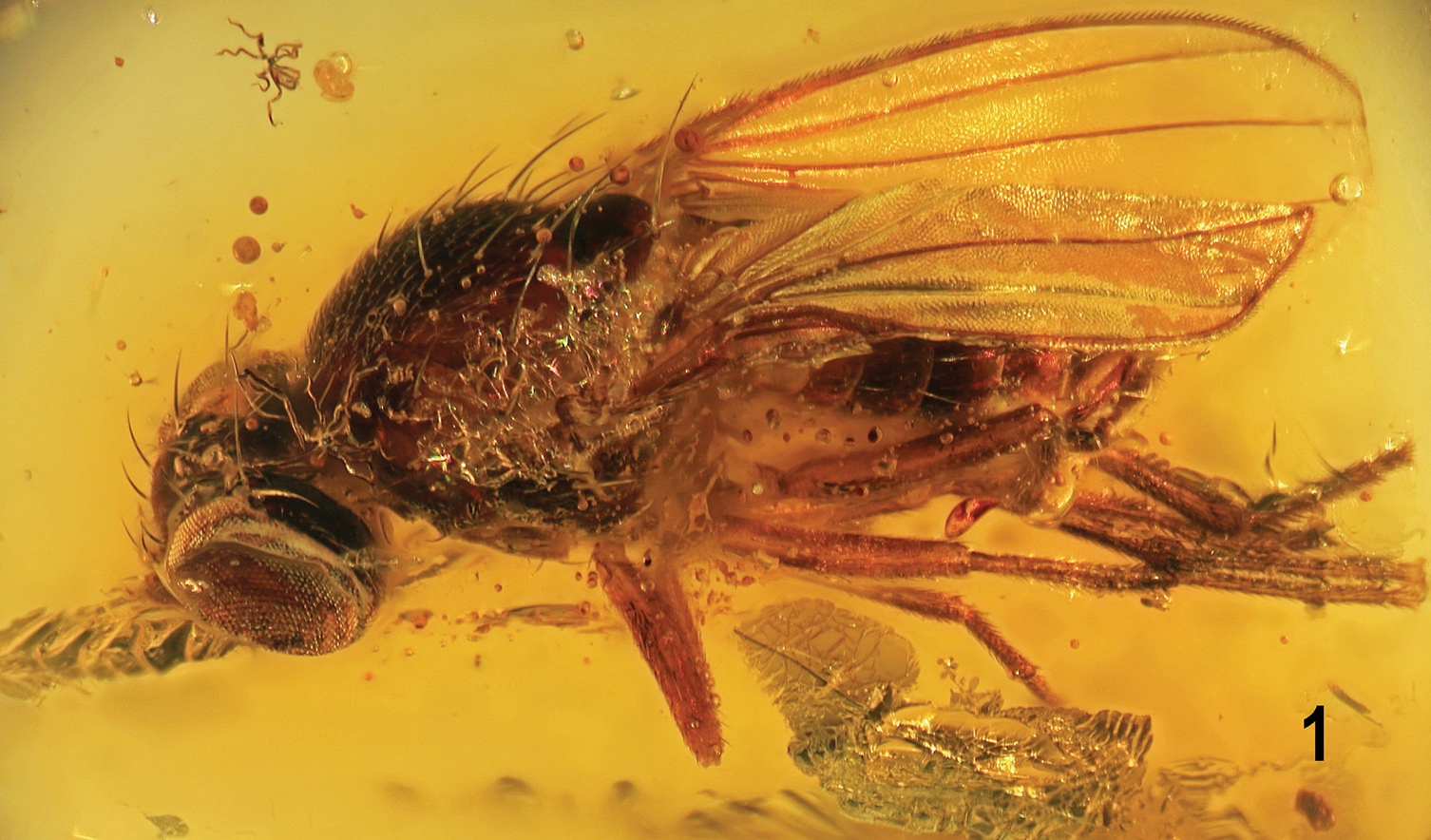
Protanthomyza grimaldii in Baltic amber

Reliquantha eocena in Baltic amber

The family includes a number of genera in two subfamilies.

- Subfamily Anthomyzinae Czerny, 1903
  - Amnonthomyza Roháček, 1993
  - Amygdalops Lamb, 1914
  - Anagnota Becker, 1902
  - Anthomyza Fallén, 1810
  - Apterosepsis Richards, 1962
  - Barbarista Roháček, 1993
  - Carexomyza Roháček, 2009
  - Cercagnota Roháček & Freidberg, 1993
  - Epischnomyia Roháček, 2006
  - Fungomyza Roháček, 1999
  - †Grimalantha Roháček, 1998 (Burdigalian, Dominican amber)
  - Ischnomyia Loew, 1863
  - †Lacrimyza Roháček, 2013 (Lutetian, Baltic Amber)
  - Margdalops Roháček & Barraclough, 2003
  - Mumetopia Melander, 1913
  - Paranthomyza Czerny, 1902
  - Receptrixa Roháček, 2006
  - Reliquantha Roháček, 2014 (Lutetian, Baltic amber)
  - Santhomyza Roháček, 1984
  - Stiphrosoma Czerny, 1928
  - Typhamyza Roháček, 1992
  - Zealantha Roháček, 2007
- Subfamily †Protanthomyzinae Roháček, 1998
  - †Protanthomyza Hennig, 1965 (Lutetian, Baltic Amber, Bitterfeld amber)
