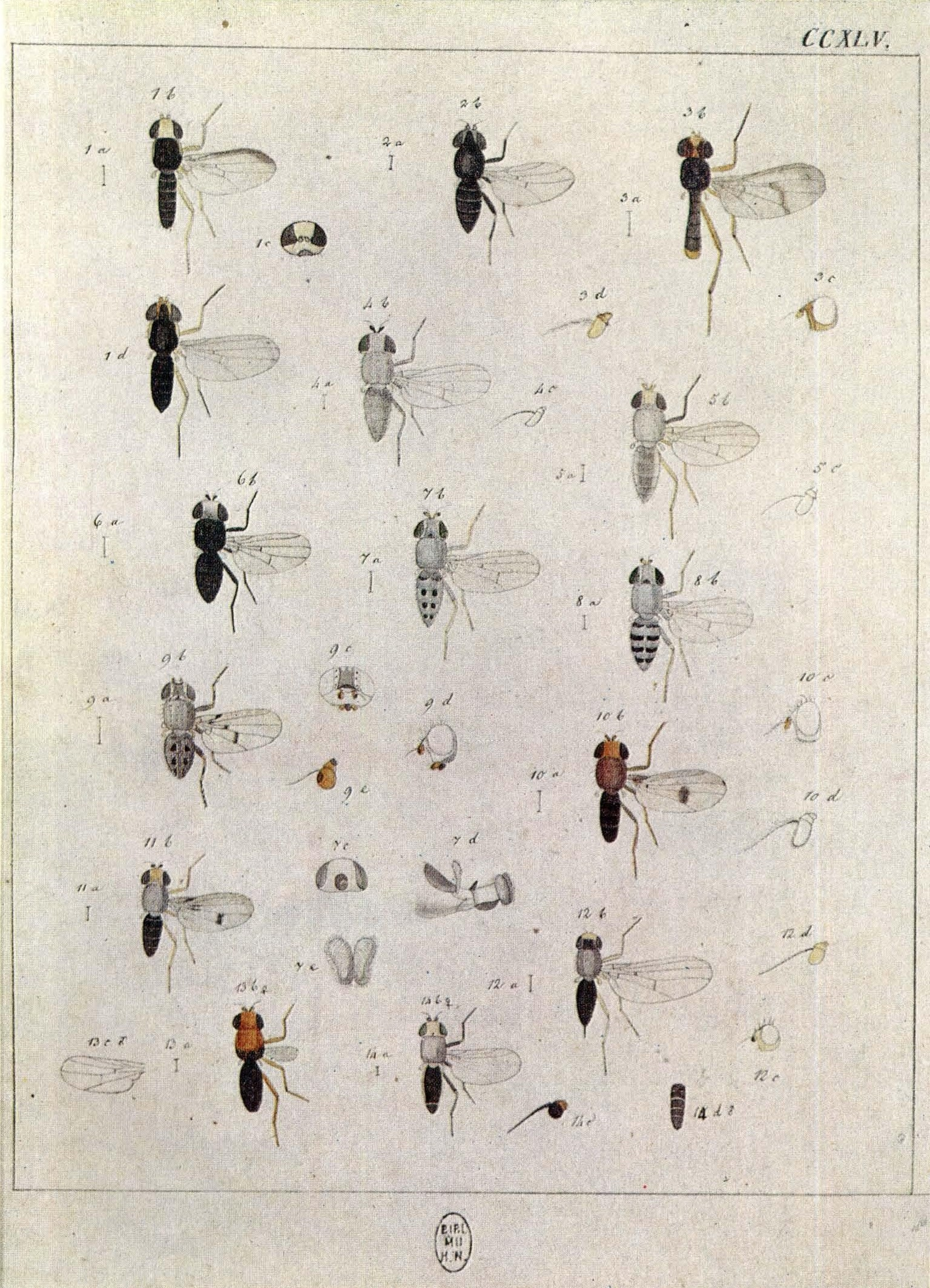
- Odinia maculata figured in Europäischen Zweiflügeligen (fig. 9)

Scientific classification
- Kingdom: Animalia
- Phylum: Arthropoda
- Clade: Pancrustacea
- Class: Insecta
- Order: Diptera
- Superfamily: Opomyzoidea
- Family: Odiniidae

Subfamilies
- Odiniinae; Traginopinae

= Odiniidae =

Family of flies

Odinia cf. boletina on Fomes fomentarius

Odiniidae is a small family of flies. There are only 58 described species but there are representatives in all the major biogeographic realms.

Life histories are known for only few species of Odinia, and no biological information is available for the majority of species in the family. Known odiniid larvae live in the tunnels of wood-boring larvae of Coleoptera, Lepidoptera, and other Diptera and function as scavengers or predators of the host larvae. One species, Turanodinia coccidarum Stackelberg, has been reared from the egg masses of Pseudococcus comstocki Kuwana, a mealybug.

== Family description ==
See which as well as text has excellent illustrations of Odinia viz .

== Taxonomy ==
- Subfamily Odiniinae

- Afrodinia Cogan, 1975
- Neoalticomerus Hendel, 1903
- Odinia Robineau-Desvoidy, 1830
- Turanodinia Stackelberg, 1944

- Subfamily Traginopinae

- Coganodinia Gaimari & Mathis, 2008
- Helgreelia Gaimari, 2007
- Lopesiodinia Prado, 1973
- Neoschildomyia Gaimari, 2007
- Neotraginops Prado, 1973
- Paratraginops Hendel, 1917
- Pradomyia Gaimari, 2007
- Schildomyia Malloch, 1926
- Shewellia Hennig, 1969
- Traginops Coquillett, 1900

== Identification ==
- Cogan, B.H.,1975 New Taxa in Two Families Previously Unrecorded from the Ethiopian Region(Diptera, Odiniidae and Diastatidae). Ann. Natal Mus. 22(2):471-488. Key to Afrotropic genera and species.
- Prado, A. P., 1973 Contribuicão ao Conhecimento da Familia Odiniidae (Diptera, Acalyptratae). Studia Entomologica, Petrópolis, v. 16, n. 1–4, p. 481-510. Keys world genera.
- Collin, J.E. (1952), On the European species of the genus Odinia R.-D. (Diptera: Odiniidae). Proceedings of the Royal entomological Society of London (B) 21: 110–116.

== Other literature ==
- Papp, L., 1978 71. család: Odiniidae - Taplólegyek.In: Dély-Draskovits Á. & Papp L., Taplólegyek - Gabonalegyek. Odiniidae - Chloropidae. Fauna Hung., 133, 202 pp. Akadémiai Kiadó, Budapest. (In Hungarian).
- Przemysław Trojan, 1962 Odiniidae, Clusiidae, Anthomyzidae, Opomyzidae, Tethinidae in (series) Klucze do oznaczania owadów Polski, 28,54/58; Muchowki = Diptera, 54/58 Publisher Warszawa : Państwowe Wydawnictwo Naukowe (In Polish)

== Species lists ==
- Palaearctic
- Nearctic
- Japan
- Australasian/Oceanian
- British
