= Canacinae =

Scientific classification
- Kingdom: Animalia
- Phylum: Arthropoda
- Clade: Pancrustacea
- Class: Insecta
- Order: Diptera
- Family: Canacidae
- Subfamily: Canacinae; Jones, 1906

Subfamily of insects

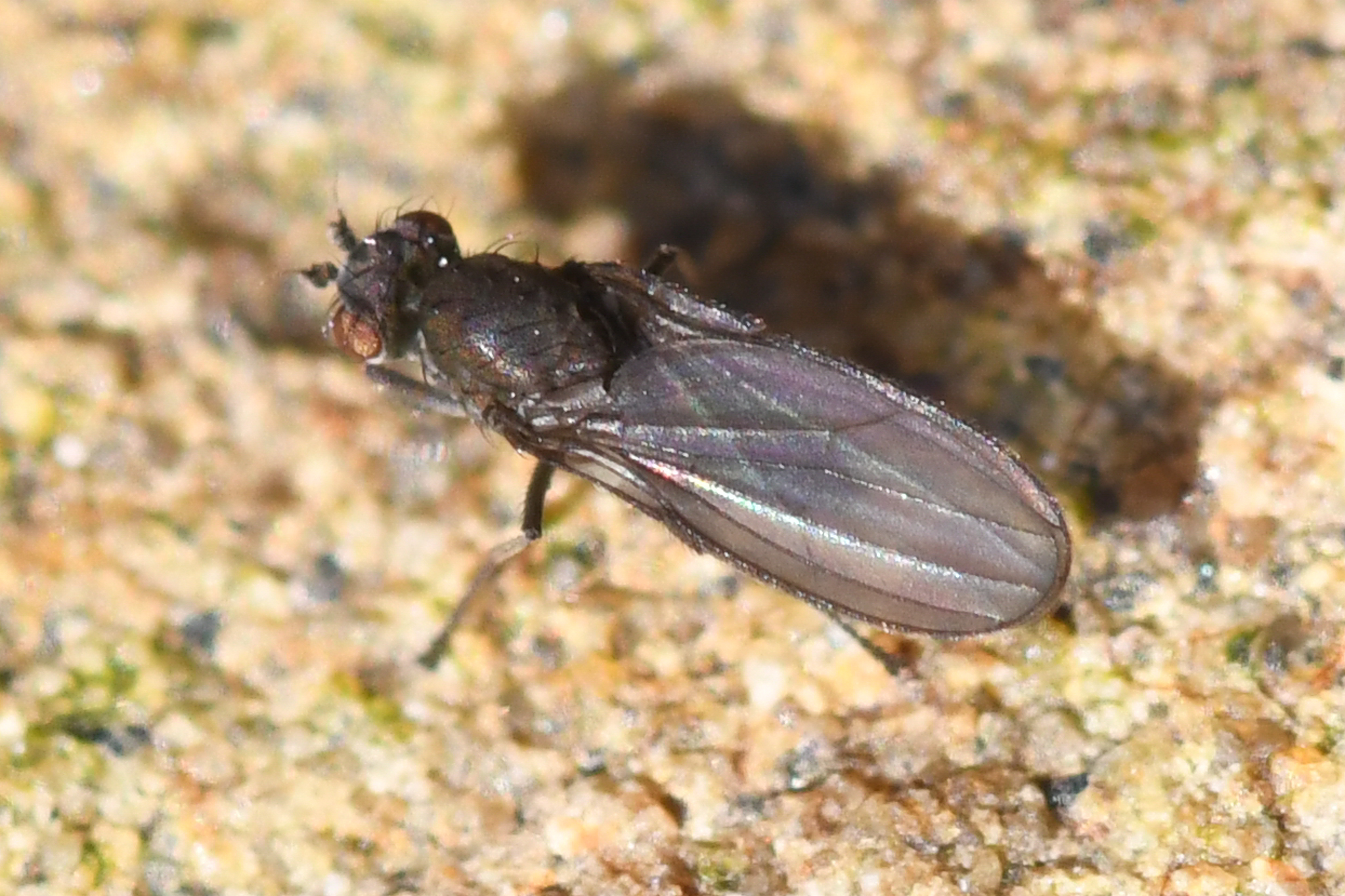
Canaceoides nudatus. Canaceoides is a genus in the family Canacidae.

Canacinae is a subfamily of beach flies in the family of Canacidae.

== Tribes & genera ==
- Tribe Canacini Jones, 1906

- Canace Haliday in Curtis, 1837

- Tribe Dynomiellini Mathis, 1982

- Canacea Cresson, 1924
- Chaetocanace Hendel, 1914
- Dynomiella Giordani Soika, 1956
- Isocanace Mathis, 1982
- Trichocanace Wirth, 1951
- Xanthocanace Hendel, 1914
