= Xanthocanace ranula =

Scientific classification
- Kingdom: Animalia
- Phylum: Arthropoda
- Class: Insecta
- Order: Diptera
- Family: Canacidae
- Genus: Xanthocanace
- Species: X. ranula

Binomial name
- Xanthocanace ranula (Loew, 1874)

Synonyms
- Canace ranula Loew, 1874

Species of fly

Xanthocanace ranula is a European species of Canacidae.

== Distribution ==
Belgium, Denmark, England, Germany, Ireland, Italy, Spain and Canary Islands.
