= Canace salonitana =

Scientific classification
- Kingdom: Animalia
- Phylum: Arthropoda
- Class: Insecta
- Order: Diptera
- Family: Canacidae
- Genus: Canace
- Species: C. salonitana

Binomial name
- Canace salonitana Strobl, 1900

Species of fly

Canace salonitana, is a European species of Canacidae.

== Distribution ==
It is known from Bulgaria, Croatia, Egypt, Crete, Israel and Italy.
