= Canace actites =

Scientific classification
- Kingdom: Animalia
- Phylum: Arthropoda
- Clade: Pancrustacea
- Class: Insecta
- Order: Diptera
- Family: Canacidae
- Genus: Canace
- Species: C. actites

Binomial name
- Canace actites Mathis, 1982

Species of fly

Canace actites, is a European species of Canacidae.

== Distribution ==
It is only known from the Canary Island of Tenerife and from Madeira.
