= Tethina parvula =

Scientific classification
- Domain: Eukaryota
- Kingdom: Animalia
- Phylum: Arthropoda
- Class: Insecta
- Order: Diptera
- Family: Canacidae
- Genus: Tethina
- Species: T. parvula

Binomial name
- Tethina parvula (Loew, 1869)

Synonyms
- Rhicnoessa parvula Loew, 1869; Rhicnoessa whitmani Melander, 1913

Species of fly

Tethina parvula is a species of fly in the family Canacidae.
