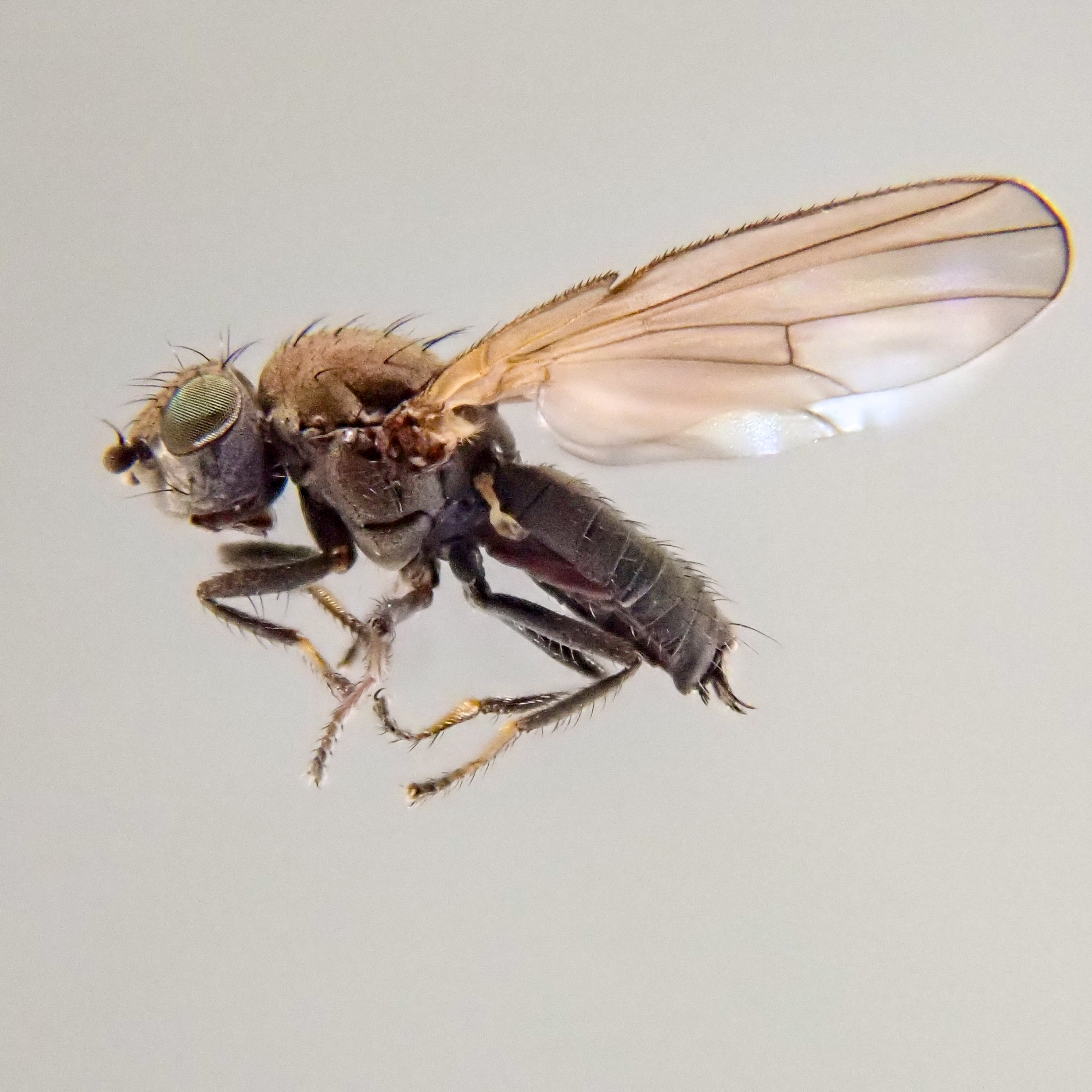

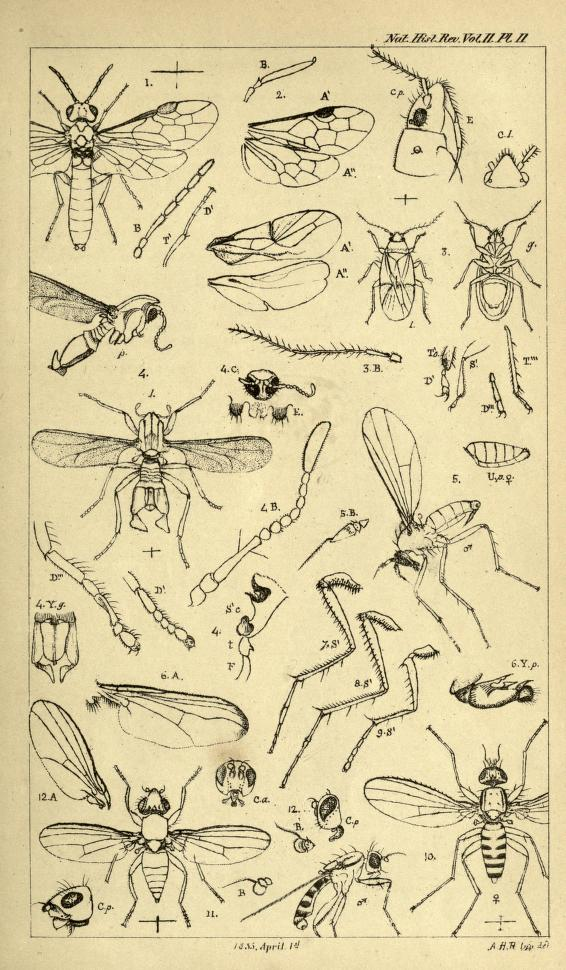

Scientific classification
- Kingdom: Animalia
- Phylum: Arthropoda
- Class: Insecta
- Order: Diptera
- Family: Canacidae
- Genus: Canace
- Species: C. nasica

Binomial name
- Canace nasica (Haliday, 1839)

Synonyms
- Canace nascia Haliday in Curtis, 1837; Ephydra nasica Haliday, 1839

= Canace nasica =

Species of fly

Canace nascia is a European species of Canacidae.

It is a very small (2 mm. long) fly overall greyish or greyish-brown fly with complete wing venation.The interocular space is matte brown .There are two inner orbital bristles, and an upper orbital bristle curved outwards, over the eyes. Face, cheeks and clypeus are grey. The antennae are black. Short proboscis; palps a little enlarged. Mesonotum dull brown, the pleurae grey. There are four dorsocentral bristles. Black legs; The second tergite of the abdomen is enlarged, blackish. For terms see Morphology of Diptera. It is a sea-shore or salt-marsh species.

== Distribution ==
Cape Verde Islands, Senegal, England, France, Ireland, Spain, Egypt, Azores, Canary Islands and Madeira Islands.
