= Horaismopterinae =

Scientific classification
- Domain: Eukaryota
- Kingdom: Animalia
- Phylum: Arthropoda
- Class: Insecta
- Order: Diptera
- Family: Canacidae
- Subfamily: Horaismopterinae; Sabrosky, 1978

Subfamily of flies

Horaismopterinae is a subfamily of beach flies in the family of Canacidae. There are 5 species in 2 genera, all inhabiting oceanic seashores.

== Genera ==
- Horaismoptera Hendel, 1907
- Tethinosoma Malloch, 1930
