= Zalea =

Scientific classification
- Kingdom: Animalia
- Phylum: Arthropoda
- Clade: Pancrustacea
- Class: Insecta
- Order: Diptera
- Family: Canacidae
- Subfamily: Zaleinae
- Genus: Zalea; McAlpine, 1985

Type species
- Zale minor McAlpine, 1982

Synonyms
- Zale McAlpine, 1982

Genus of flies

Zalea is a genus of beach flies in the family Canacidae. All known species are Australasian.

== Species ==
- Z. horningi (Harrison, 1976)
- Z. major McAlpine, 1985
- Z. minor (McAlpine, 1982)
