= Thitena =

Scientific classification
- Kingdom: Animalia
- Phylum: Arthropoda
- Clade: Pancrustacea
- Class: Insecta
- Order: Diptera
- Family: Canacidae
- Subfamily: Tethininae
- Genus: Thitena; Munari, 2004

Type species
- Thitena cadaverina Munari, 2004

Genus of flies

Thitena is a genus of beach flies, insects in the family Canacidae (formally Tethinidae). All known species are Australasian in distribution.

== Species ==
- T. cadaverina Munari, 2004
