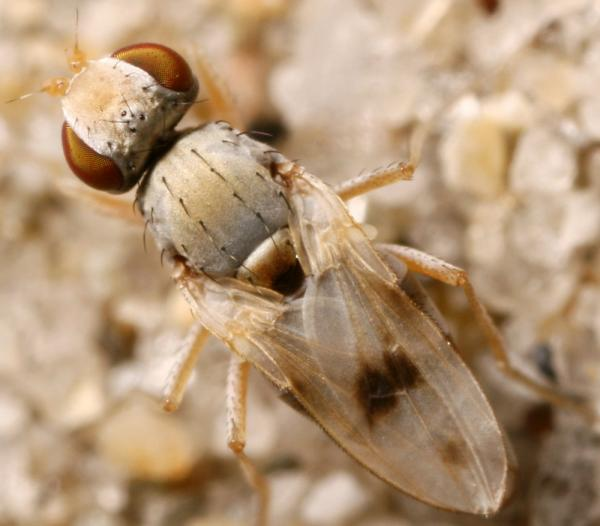
- Tethina lusitanica

Scientific classification
- Kingdom: Animalia
- Phylum: Arthropoda
- Clade: Pancrustacea
- Class: Insecta
- Order: Diptera
- Family: Canacidae
- Subfamily: Tethininae
- Genus: Tethina; Haliday in Curtis, 1937

Type species
- Opomyza (Tethina) illota Haliday in Curtis, 1937

Synonyms
- Rhicnoessa Loew, 1862; Phycomyza Melander, 1952

= Tethina =

Genus of flies

Tethina is a genus of beach flies in the family Canacidae (formally Tethinidae). They are found in all terrestrial biogeographic realms.

== Biology ==
Like most Tethininae, Tethina species mostly live in salty environments. They are found on coastal marine habitats including the intertidal zones and on wrack heaps, as well as salt marshes, coastal dune vegetation, and on salty soils or bare sand. Some species of Tethina are also found at desert oases.

== Species ==
- T. acrostichalis Freidberg and Beschovski, 1996
- T. albitarsa Foster and Mathis, 1998
- T. alboguttata (Strobl, 1900)
- T. albosetulosa (Strobl, 1900)
- T. albula (Loew, 1869)
- T. amphitrite Munari and Báez, 2000
- T. angustifrons Melander, 1952
- T. angustipennis (Melander, 1952)
- T. callosirostris Munari, 2008
- T. cohiba Foster and Mathis, 1998
- T. czernyi (Hendel, 1934)
- T. dunae Munari, 2007
- T. flavigenis (Hendel, 1934)
- T. flavoidea Beschovski, 1997
- T. gatti Munari and Ebejer, 2001
- T. gobii Beschovski and Nartshuk, 1997
- T. grisea (Fallén, 1823)
- T. grossipes (Becker, 1908)
- T. guttata Freidberg and Beschovski, 1996
- T. heringi (Hendel, 1934)
- T. hirsuta Munari, 2000
- T. histrica Munari, 2009
- T. horripilans (Melander, 1952)
- T. illota (Haliday in Curtis, 1937)
- T. incisuralis (Macquart, 1851)
- T. inopinata Munari and Canzoneri, 1992
- T. insignis Becker, 1907
- T. insulans Curran, 1932
- T. intermedia Collin, 1966
- T. karatasensis Munari, 1981
- T. lisae Foster and Mathis, 1998
- T. litocola Munari and Ebejer, 2001
- T. longilabella Munari, 2007
- T. longirostris (Loew, 1865)
- T. lusitanica Munari, Almeida, and Andrade, 2009
- T. luteosetosa Beschovski and Nartshuk, 1997
- T. mariae Munari, 2004
- T. marmorata (Becker, 1908)
- T. melitensis Munari, 2004
- T. merzi Munari, 1999
- T. milichioides Melander, 1913
- T. mima Munari, 1996
- T. minoia Munari, 1999
- T. multipilosa Beschovski and Nartshuk, 1997
- T. munarii Carles-Tolrá, 1993
- T. nigriseta Malloch, 1924
- T. nigrofemorata Beschovski, 1997
- T. omanensis Munari, 2007
- T. orientalis Hendel, 1934
- T. pallidiseta Malloch, 1935
- T. pallipes (Loew, 1865)
- T. parvula (Loew, 1869)
- T. pictipennis Munari, 2004
- T. pleuralis Munari, 2010
- T. prognatha Melander, 1952
- T. robusta Foster and Mathis, 2000
- T. saigusai Sasakawa, 1986
- T. salinicola Beschovski, 1998
- T. sasakawai Foster and Mathis, 2008
- T. shalom Freidberg and Beschovski, 1996
- T. soikai Munari, 1981
- T. spinigera Munari, 2008
- T. spinulosa Cole, 1923
- T. stobaeana Munari, 1996
- T. strobliana (Mercier, 1923)
- T. stukei Munari, 2010
- T. subpunctata Beschovski, 1994
- T. tethys Munari and Báez, 2000
- T. thula Munari, 2004
- T. tschirnhausi Munari, 1999
- T. willistoni Melander, 1913
- T. xanthopoda Williston, 1896
- T. yaromi Freidberg and Beschovski, 1996
- T. yemenensis Munari, 2004
