= Pseudorhicnoessa =

Scientific classification
- Kingdom: Animalia
- Phylum: Arthropoda
- Clade: Pancrustacea
- Class: Insecta
- Order: Diptera
- Family: Canacidae
- Subfamily: Tethininae
- Genus: Pseudorhicnoessa; Malloch, 1914

Type species
- Pseudorhicnoessa spinipes Malloch, 1914

Synonyms
- Macrotethina Malloch, 1935

Genus of flies

Pseudorhicnoessa is a genus of beach flies, insects in the family Canacidae (formally Tethinidae). All species are Indopacific in distribution .

== Species ==
- P. rattii Munari, 1981
- P. spinipes Malloch, 1914
- P. longicerca Munari, 2014
