= Procanace =

Scientific classification
- Kingdom: Animalia
- Phylum: Arthropoda
- Clade: Pancrustacea
- Class: Insecta
- Order: Diptera
- Family: Canacidae
- Subfamily: Nocticanacinae
- Genus: Procanace; Hendel, 1913

Type species
- Procanace grisescens Hendel, 1913

Genus of flies

Procanace is a genus of beach flies (insects in the family Canacidae). All known species are Oriental, Afrotropical, Palaearctic, Neotropical or Australasian.

== Identification ==
They are the only Nocticanacinae where the interfrontal setae are absent.

== Species ==
- P. acuminata Hardy and Delfinado, 1980
- P. aestuaricola Miyagi, 1965
- P. bifurcata Hardy and Delfinado, 1980
- P. canzonerii Mathis and Freidberg, 1991
- P. cogani Mathis, 1988
- P. confusa Hardy and Delfinado, 1980
- P. constricta Hardy and Delfinado, 1980
- P. cressoni Wirth, 1951
- P. dianneae Mathis, 1988
- P. flavescens Miyagi, 1965
- P. flaviantennalis Miyagi, 1965
- P. fulva Miyagi, 1965
- P. gressitti Delfinado, 1970
- P. grisescens Hendel, 1913
- P. hendeli Delfinado, 1971
- P. mcalpinei [sic] Mathis, 1996
- P. macquariensis Womersley, 1937
- P. nakazatoi Miyagi, 1965
- P. nigroviridis Cresson, 1926
- P. novaeguineae Delfinado, 1970
- P. opaca de Meijere, 1916
- P. pauliani Mathis and Wirth, 1979
- P. pninae Mathis and Freidberg, 1991
- P. quadrisetosa Hardy and Delfinado, 1980
- P. rivalis Miyagi, 1965
- P. suigoensis Miyagi, 1965
- P. taiwanensis Delfinado, 1971
- P. townesi Wirth, 1951
- P. williamsi Wirth, 1951
- P. wirthi Hardy and Delfinado, 1980
