= Paracanace =

Scientific classification
- Kingdom: Animalia
- Phylum: Arthropoda
- Clade: Pancrustacea
- Class: Insecta
- Order: Diptera
- Family: Canacidae
- Subfamily: Nocticanacinae
- Genus: Paracanace; Mathis & Wirth, 1978

Type species
- Paracanace hoguei Mathis & Wirth, 1978

Genus of flies

Paracanace is a genus of beach flies in the family Canacidae. All known species are Oriental, Neotropical, or Australasian.

== Species ==
- P. aicen Mathis and Wirth, 1978
- P. blantoni (Wirth, 1956)
- P. cavagnaroi With, 1969
- P. hoguei Mathis & Wirth, 1978
- P. lebam Mathis & Wirth, 1978
- P. maritima (Wirth, 1951)
- P. oliveirai (Wirth, 1956)
