= Canace (fly) =

Scientific classification
- Kingdom: Animalia
- Phylum: Arthropoda
- Clade: Pancrustacea
- Class: Insecta
- Order: Diptera
- Family: Canacidae
- Subfamily: Canacinae
- Tribe: Canacini
- Genus: Canace; Haliday in Curtis, 1837

Type species
- Ephydra nasica Haliday, 1839

Synonyms
- Ephydra Haliday, 1839

Genus of flies

Canace is a genus of beach flies in the family Canacidae. All known species are of Afrotropical or Palaearctic distribution.

== Species ==
- Canace actites (Mathis, 1982)
- Canace nasica (Haliday, 1839)
- Canace rossii (Canzoneri, 1982)
- Canace salonitana (Strobl, 1900)
- Canace zvuv (Mathis & Freidberg, 1991)
