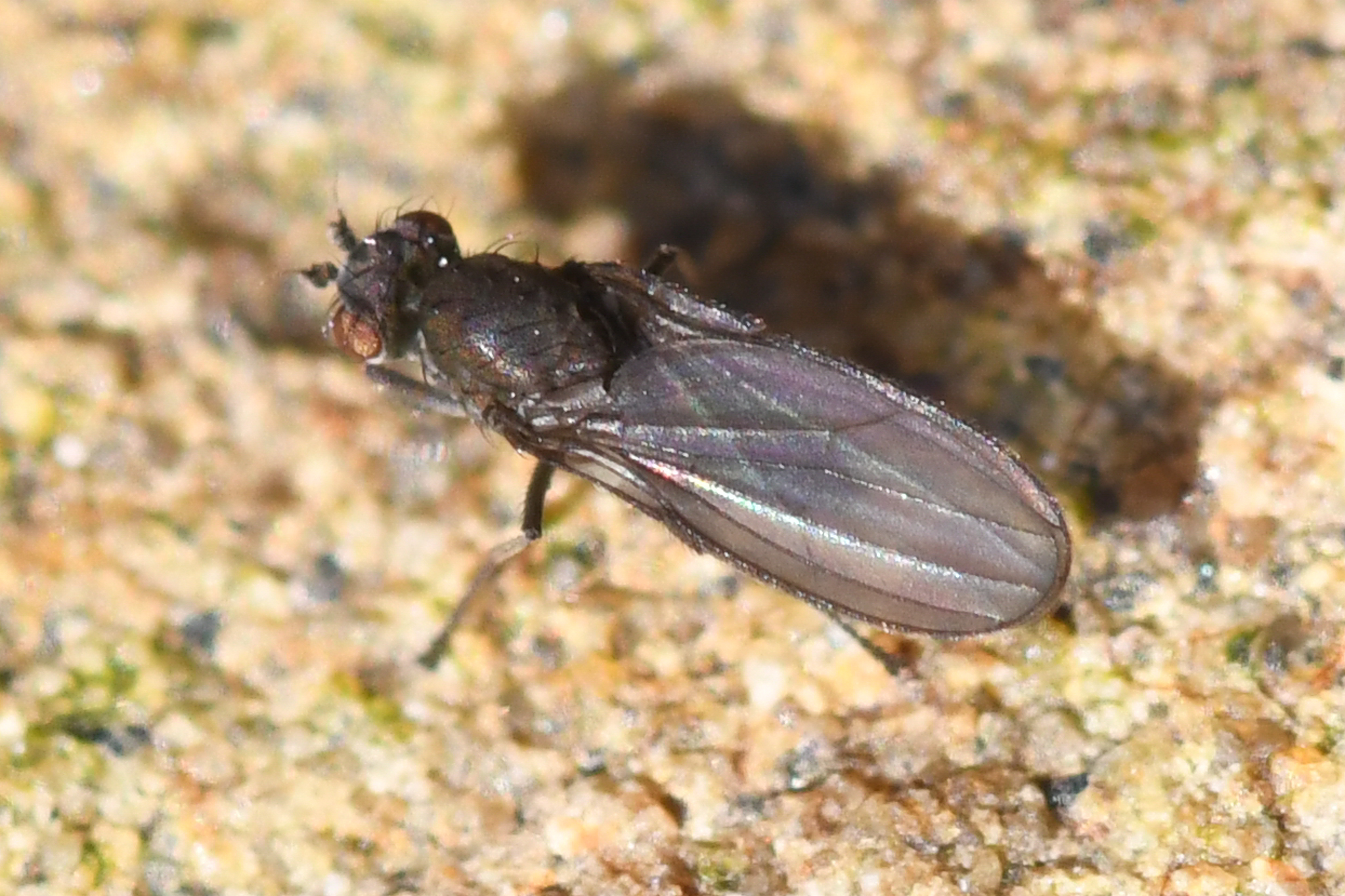
- Canaceoides nudatus

Scientific classification
- Kingdom: Animalia
- Phylum: Arthropoda
- Clade: Pancrustacea
- Class: Insecta
- Order: Diptera
- Family: Canacidae
- Subfamily: Nocticanacinae
- Genus: Canaceoides; Cresson, 1934

Type species
- Canace nudatus Cresson, 1934

Synonyms
- Neocanace Curran, 1934; Procanace Curran, 1934

= Canaceoides =

Genus of flies

Canaceoides is a genus of beach flies in the family Canacidae. All known species are Oriental, Neotropical, or Australasian.

== Species ==
- C. angulatus Wirth, 1969
- C. balboai Wirth, 1969
- C. hawaiiensis Wirth, 1969
- C. nudatus Cresson, 1934
- C. panamensis (Curran, 1934)
- C. scutellatus Wirth, 1969
- C. setosus Wirth, 1969
- C. spinosus Wirth, 1969
- C. tenuistylus Wirth, 1969
