= Xanthocanace =

Scientific classification
- Kingdom: Animalia
- Phylum: Arthropoda
- Clade: Pancrustacea
- Class: Insecta
- Order: Diptera
- Family: Canacidae
- Subfamily: Canacinae
- Tribe: Dynomiellini
- Genus: Xanthocanace; Hendel, 1914

Type species
- Canace ranula Loew, 1874

Synonyms
- Dinomyia Becker, 1926; Myioblax Enderlein, 1935

Genus of flies

Xanthocanace is a genus of beach flies in the family Canacidae. All known species are Oriental, Palearctic, or Afrotropical.

== Species ==
- X. capensis Wirth, 1956
- X. hamifer Munari, 2008
- X. kaplanorum Mathis and Freidberg, 1982
- X. magna (Hendel, 1914)
- X. nigrifrons Malloch, 1924
- X. orientalis Hendel, 1913
- X. pollinosa Miyagi, 1963
- X. ranula (Loew, 1874)
- X. sabroskyi Mathis and Freidberg, 1982
- X. seoulensis Miyagi, 1963
- X. zeylanica Delfinado, 1975
