= Suffomyia =

Scientific classification
- Kingdom: Animalia
- Phylum: Arthropoda
- Clade: Pancrustacea
- Class: Insecta
- Order: Diptera
- Family: Canacidae
- Subfamily: Zaleinae
- Genus: Suffomyia; Freidberg, 1995

Type species
- Suffomyia scutellaris Freidberg, 1995

Genus of flies

Suffomyia is a genus of beach flies in the family Canacidae. All known species are Australasian or African.

== Species ==
- S. dancei Munari, 2008
- S. scutellaris Freidberg, 1995
- S. ismayi McAlpine, 2007
- S. sabroskyi McAlpine, 2007
