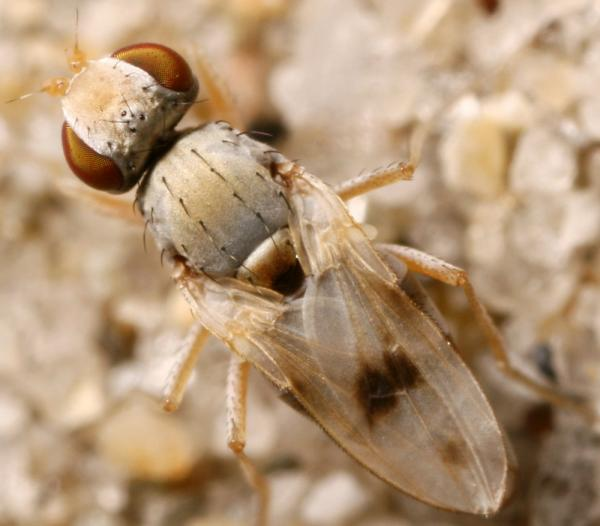
- Tethina lusitanica

Scientific classification
- Kingdom: Animalia
- Phylum: Arthropoda
- Class: Insecta
- Order: Diptera
- Family: Canacidae
- Subfamily: Tethininae; Hendel, 1916

= Tethininae =

Subfamily of flies

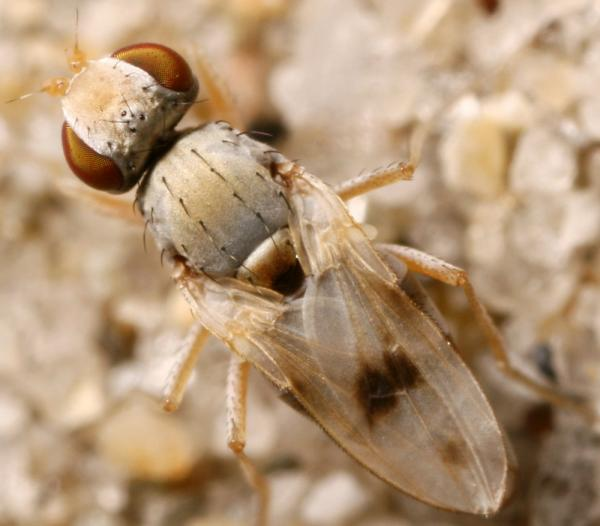
Tethina lusitanica

Tethininae, formally the family Tethinidae is a paraphyletic group of tiny drab-coloured or grey Acalyptratae flies. There are over 115 species in 7 genera known from all zoogeographic regions. They are inconspicuous flies which are still poorly known in some remote, huge, tropical areas (e.g. South America).

== Natural history ==
Tethininae are found in maritime, often littoral habitats. The adults are sometimes abundant in rotting seaweed. A few species occur inland, in association with alkaline habitats in arid zones. Except for the subantarctic genera Apetaenus and Listriomastax, little is known about the immature stages of the family, although presumably most are associated with rotting seaweed. Workers in dipterology which are unfamiliar with tethinids often associate these flies with the presence of seashores, particularly sandy beaches and coastal lagoons. This is true for most strictly thalassophilous species, which occur on dunes, sandy soil and wrack heaps stranded on the beach. However, many entomologists often ignore or simply overlook the fact that populations of certain species also inhabit biotopes situated far off from sea littorals, sometimes several hundreds of kilometres inland, and are almost always closely dependent on the proximity of continental saline environments. It is well known that most species, if not all, belonging to the subfamily Pelomyiinae are not thalassophilous flies, but are almost exclusively found inland, associated with meadows, mountain passes, forests, areas and waters polluted by rotting waste, industrial emissions or debris of slaughterhouses and poultry farms (sites of salt accumulation and enrichment), as well as desert oases. However, this is not infrequent in various species of the genus Tethina, too.

== Genera ==
- Afrotethina Munari, 1986
- Dasyrhicnoessa Hendel, 1934
- Plesiotethina Munari, 2000
- Pseudorhicnoessa Malloch, 1914
- Sigaloethina Munari, 2004
- Tethina Haliday in Curtis, 1937
- Thitena Munari, 2004

== Subfamily Description ==
See

== Identification (Literature) ==
- Czerny, L. 1928: 55. Tethinidae. In Lindner, E. Die Fliegen der Paläarktischen Region, Bd. VI/1: 1-8, Textfig. 1-7, Stuttgart.
- Collin, J.E., 1966. A revision of the Palaearctic species of Tethina and Rhicnoessa. Bolletino del Museo civico di Storia naturale di Venezia 16 (1963): 19-32.
- Foster, G.A. & Mathis, W.N., 2003. A revision of the genera Pelomyia Williston and Masoniella Vockeroth (Diptera: Tethinidae). Smithsonian Contributions to Zoology 619:63 pp.
- Foster, G. A. & Mathis, W. N., 1998. A revision of the family Tethinidae (Diptera) from the Caribbean, Gulf of Mexico, and Bermuda. Proceedings of the Entomological Society of Washington 100(4): 601-632.
- Foster, G. A., and Mathis, W. N., 2000. Notes on Neotropical species of Tethina Haliday (Diptera: Tethinidae). Proceedings of the Entomological Society of Washington 102(3): 542-548.
- Foster, G. A. & Mathis, W. N., 2008. A Review of the Genus Tethina Haliday from Western North America. Proceedings of the Entomological Society of Washington 110(2): 300-330.
- Hendel, F. 1916. Beitrage zur Systematik der Acalyptraten Musciden (Dipt.). Ent. Mitt. 5: 294-299.
- Mathis, W.N. and Munari, L., 1996. World Catalog of the Family Tethinidae (Diptera). Smithsonian Contributions to Zoology 584: IV + 27 pp.
- Mathis, W. N. & Foster, G. A., 2007. Canacidae (Diptera) From the Delmarva States. Proceedings of the Biological Society of Washington 120(4): 387-428.
- McAlpine, D.K., 2007. The Surge Flies (Diptera: Canacidae: Zaleinae) of Australasia and notes on Tethinid-Canacid morphology and relationships. "Records of the Australian Museum" 59: 27-64"
- Melander, A.L., 1952. The North American species of Tethinidae (Diptera). J. N.Y. Entomol. Soc. 59: 187-212.
- Munari, L. & Mathis, W.N., 2010. World Catalog of the Family Canacidae (including Tethinidae) (Diptera), with keys to the supraspecific taxa. "Zootaxa" 2471: 1-84. ISSN 1175-5326 (print edition), ISSN 1175-5334 (online edition).
- Przemysław Trojan, 1962 Odiniidae, Clusiidae, Anthomyzidae, Opomyzidae, Tethinidae in (series) Klucze do oznaczania owadów Polski, 28,54/58; Muchowki = Diptera, 54/58 Publisher Warszawa : Państwowe Wydawnictwo Naukowe (in Polish)

== Species Lists ==
- West Palaearctic including Russia Note: The species described for the western Palaeartic Region (in particular for Europe and the Mediterranean river basin) need taxonomic review.
- Nearctic
- Australasian/Oceanian.
- Japan
- UK
