= Nocticanace =

Scientific classification
- Kingdom: Animalia
- Phylum: Arthropoda
- Clade: Pancrustacea
- Class: Insecta
- Order: Diptera
- Family: Canacidae
- Subfamily: Nocticanacinae
- Genus: Nocticanace; Malloch, 1933

Type species
- Nocticanace peculiaris Malloch, 1933

Genus of flies

Nocticanace is a genus of beach flies that belongs to the subfamily Nocticanacinae. Members of this genus have a wide range being found nearly worldwide in the Oriental, Neotropical and Australasian realms.

== Description ==
Members of this genus are small to medium sized with a range of body lengths from 1.80–3.70 mm. While their coloration can vary depending on the species groups they belongs to but their bodies are generally grayish black to black in color. Members of the pacifica-group are generally dark or grayish brown to grayish black with the exception of Nocticanace flavipalpis and Nocticanace litorea that are instead a light tan body coloration and extensively yellowish colored legs.

The palpus is grayish black. The ocelli are very minute and widely separated from each other. These ocelli are arranged to form an isosceles triangle. They are also not located on an elevation surface.

== Taxonomy ==
The genus was established in 1933 by John Russell Malloch, a Scottish entomologist who specializes in the study of Diptera (flies) and Hymenoptera (bees, wasps and ants).

=== Species ===
There are currently more than 35 described species that belongs to this genus making it one of the most species-rich genus of beach fly. Most of this diversity are found in the Old World. These species are divided into various species groups: the ashlocki-group, chilensis group, galapagensis-group, pacifica-group and the texensis-group.

Species belonging to this genus are listed below:

- N. actites Mathis & Wirth, 1979
- N. affinis Munari, 2008
- N. arnaudi Wirth, 1954
- N. ashlocki Wirth, 1969
- N. austra Mathis & Marinoni, 2026
- N. caffraria (Cresson, 1934)
- N. cancer Wirth, 1969
- N. chilensis (Cresson, 1931)
- N. curioi Wirth, 1969
- N. cyclura Mathis & Wirth, 1979
- N. danjoensis Miyagi, 1973
- N. danvini Wirth, 1969
- N. flavipalpis Mathis & Wirth, 1979
- N. galapagensis (Curran, 1934)
- N. hachijuoensis Miyagi, 1965
- N. japonicus Miyagi, 1965
- N. litoralis Delfinado, 1971
- N. littorea Mathis & Freidberg, 1991
- N. mahensis (Lamb, 1912)
- N. malayensis Miyagi, 1973
- N. marshallensis Wirth, 1951
- N. paciftcus Sasakawa, 1955
- N. packhamorum Mathis & Marinoni, 2026
- N. panamensis Mathis, 1989
- N. peculiaris Malloch, 1933 (Type species)
- N. propristyla Miyagi, 1973
- N. scapanius Wirth, 1969
- N. sinaiensis Mathis, 1982
- N. sinensis Delfinado, 1971
- N. spinicosta Wirth, 1969
- N. takagii Miyagi, 1965
- N. taprobane Mathis, 1982
- N. texensis (Wheeler, 1952)
- N. usingeri Wirth, 1969
- N. wirthi Mathis, 1989
- N. zimmermani Wirth, 1951
