= Afrotethina =

Scientific classification
- Kingdom: Animalia
- Phylum: Arthropoda
- Clade: Pancrustacea
- Class: Insecta
- Order: Diptera
- Family: Canacidae
- Subfamily: Tethininae
- Genus: Afrotethina; Munari, 1986

Type species
- Afrotethina aemiliani Munari, 1986

Genus of flies

Afrotethina is a genus of beach flies in the family Canacidae (formally Tethinidae). All known species are Afrotropical in distribution .

== Species ==
- A. aemiliani Munari, 1986
- A. aurisetulosa (Lamb, 1914)
- A. brevicostata Munari, 1990
- A. femoralis Munari, 1981
- A. kaplanae Munari, 1994
- A. martinezi Munari, 2005
- A. persimilis Munari, 1991
- A. stuckenbergi Munari, 1990
