= Dasyrhicnoessa =

Scientific classification
- Kingdom: Animalia
- Phylum: Arthropoda
- Clade: Pancrustacea
- Class: Insecta
- Order: Diptera
- Family: Canacidae
- Subfamily: Tethininae
- Genus: Dasyrhicnoessa; Hendel, 1934

Type species
- Rhicnoessa fulva Lamb, 1914

Genus of flies

Dasyrhicnoessa is a genus of beach flies in the family Canacidae (formally Tethinidae). All known species are Afrotropical, Neotropical, Indomalayan, or Australasian-Oceanian in distribution .

== Species ==
- D. adelpha Munari, 1986
- D. aquila Munari, 2002
- D. atripes Munari, 2004
- D. bicolor Munari, 2002
- D. boninensis Sasakawa, 1995
- D. celata Munari, 2010
- D. ciliata Munari, 2004
- D. clandestina Munari, 2002
- D. ferruginea Lamb, 1914
- D. fulva Hendel, 1913
- D. fulvescens Malloch, 1935
- D. humilis Munari, 2004
- D. insularis (Aldrich, 1931)
- D. longisetosa Munari, 2004
- D. macalpinei Munari, 2004
- D. mathisi Munari, 2002
- D. ostentatrix Munari, 2004
- D. pallida Munari, 2004
- D. platypes Sasakawa, 1986
- D. priapus Munari, 1986
- D. serratula Malloch, 1935
- D. sexseriata Hendel, 1913
- D. tripunctata Sasakawa, 1974
- D. vockerothi Hardy and Delfinado, 1980
- D. yoshiyasui Munari, 1986
