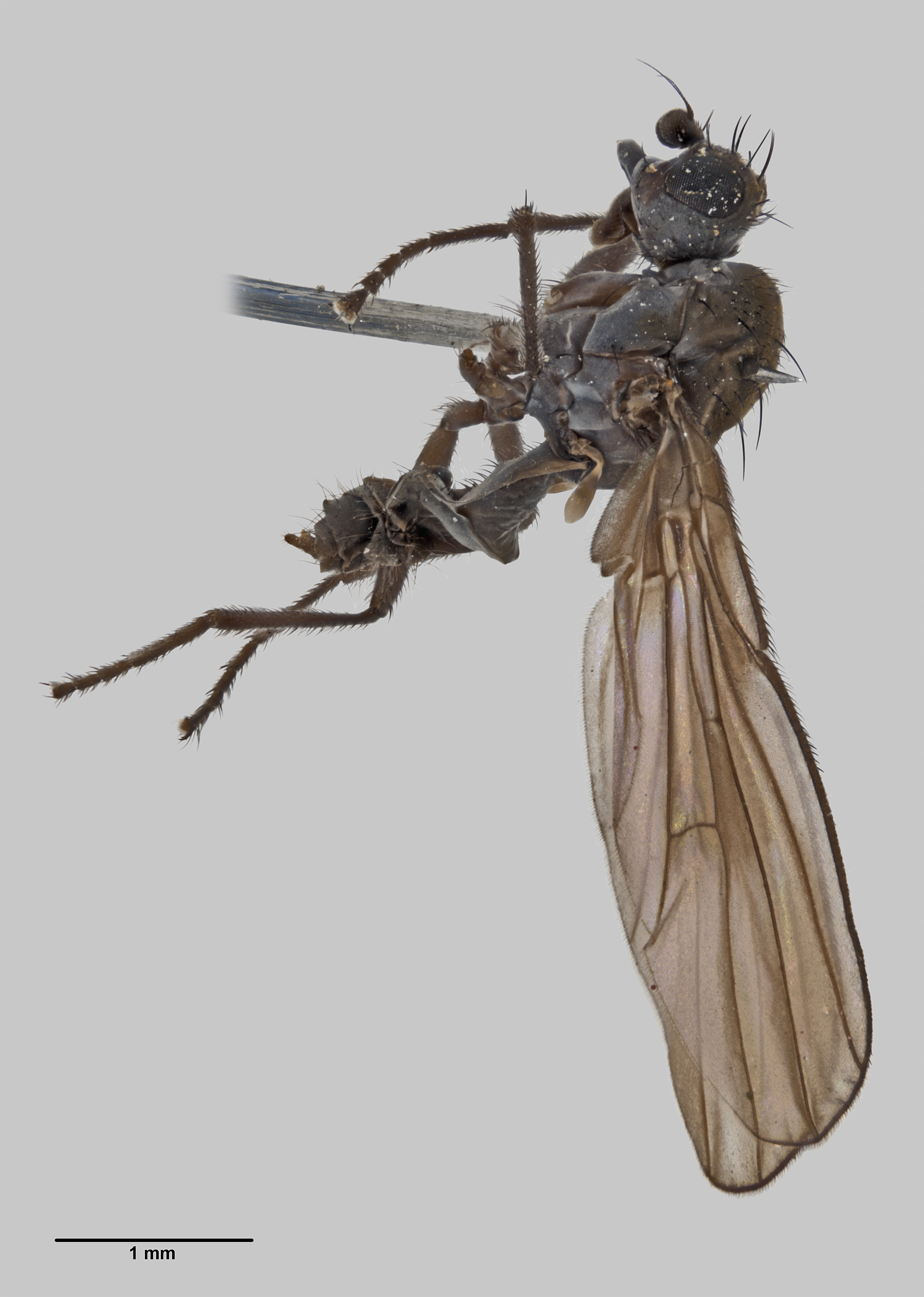
- Apetaenus australis

Scientific classification
- Kingdom: Animalia
- Phylum: Arthropoda
- Clade: Pancrustacea
- Class: Insecta
- Order: Diptera
- Family: Canacidae
- Subfamily: Apetaeninae; Mathis & Munari, 1996
- Genus: Apetaenus; Eaton, 1875

Type species
- Apetaenus litoralis Eaton, 1875

= Apetaenus =

Genus of flies

Apetaenus is a genus of beach flies in the family Canacidae. They are endemic to the subantarctic archipelagos in association with colonies of penguins and other seabirds. Some species have vestigial wings.

== Species ==
- Subgenus Apetaenus Eaton, 1875

- Apetaenus litoralis litoralis Eaton, 1875
- Apetaenus litoralis marionensis Munari, 2008
- Apetaenus litoralis watsoni Hardy, 1962

- Subgenus Listriomastax Enderlein, 1909

- Apetaenus enderleini Munari, 2007

- Subgenus Macrocanace Tonnoir and Malloch, 1926

- Apetaenus australis (Hutton, 1902)
- Apetaenus littoreus (Hutton, 1902)
