= Zaleinae =

Scientific classification
- Domain: Eukaryota
- Kingdom: Animalia
- Phylum: Arthropoda
- Class: Insecta
- Order: Diptera
- Family: Canacidae
- Subfamily: Zaleinae; McAlpine, 1985

Synonyms
- Zalinae McAlpine, 1982

Subfamily of flies

Zaleinae, is a subfamily of beach flies in the family of Canacidae. There are 16 species in 2 genera.

== Genera ==
- Zalea McAlpine, 1985
- Suffomyia Freidberg, 1995
