= Dynomiellini =

Scientific classification
- Domain: Eukaryota
- Kingdom: Animalia
- Phylum: Arthropoda
- Class: Insecta
- Order: Diptera
- Family: Canacidae
- Subfamily: Canacinae
- Tribe: Dynomiellini; Mathis, 1982

Tribe of flies

Dynomiellini, is a tribe of beach flies in the family of Canacidae.

== Genera ==
- Canacea Cresson, 1924
- Chaetocanace Hendel, 1914
- Dynomiella Giordani Soika, 1956
- Isocanace Mathis, 1982
- Trichocanace Wirth, 1951
- Xanthocanace Hendel, 1914
