= Horaismoptera =

Scientific classification
- Kingdom: Animalia
- Phylum: Arthropoda
- Clade: Pancrustacea
- Class: Insecta
- Order: Diptera
- Superfamily: Carnoidea
- Family: Canacidae
- Subfamily: Horaismopterinae
- Genus: Horaismoptera; Hendel, 1907

Type species
- Horaismoptera vulpina Hendel, 1907

Synonyms
- Selidacantha Bezzi, 1908; Oestroparea Séguy, 1933

Genus of flies

Horaismoptera is a genus of beach flies in the family Canacidae. All known species are Afrotropical or Oriental

== Species ==
- H. grisea Séguy, 1933
- H. hennigi Sabrosky, 1978
- H. microphthalma (Bezzi, 1908)
- H. vulpina Hendel, 1907
