= Nocticanacinae =

Scientific classification
- Domain: Eukaryota
- Kingdom: Animalia
- Phylum: Arthropoda
- Class: Insecta
- Order: Diptera
- Family: Canacidae
- Subfamily: Nocticanacinae; Mathis, 1982

Subfamily of flies

Nocticanacinae is a subfamily of beach flies in the family of Canacidae.

== Genera ==
- Canaceoides Cresson, 1934
- Nocticanace Malloch, 1933
- Paracanace Mathis and Wirth, 1978
- Procanace Hendel, 1913
