= Plesiotethina =

Scientific classification
- Kingdom: Animalia
- Phylum: Arthropoda
- Clade: Pancrustacea
- Class: Insecta
- Order: Diptera
- Family: Canacidae
- Subfamily: Tethininae
- Genus: Plesiotethina; Munari, 2000

Type species
- Plesiotethina australis Munari, 2000

Genus of flies

Plesiotethina is a genus of beach flies, insects in the family Canacidae (formally Tethinidae). The only known species, Plesiotethina australis, has been described from Australia .

== Species ==
- P. australis Munari, 2000
