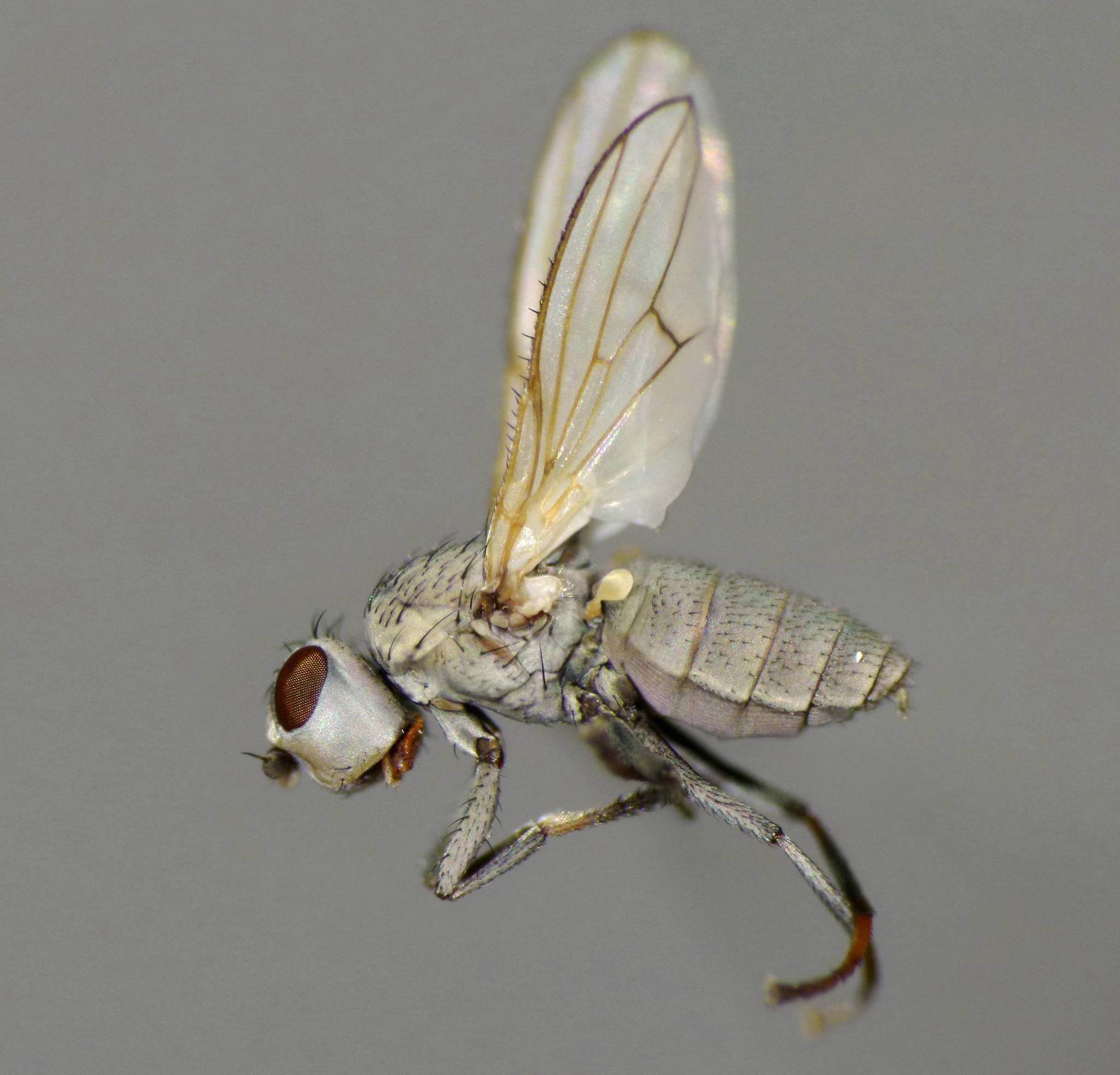

Scientific classification
- Kingdom: Animalia
- Phylum: Arthropoda
- Clade: Pancrustacea
- Class: Insecta
- Order: Diptera
- Family: Canacidae
- Subfamily: Horaismopterinae
- Genus: Tethinosoma; Malloch, 1930
- Species: T. fulvifrons

Binomial name
- Tethinosoma fulvifrons (Hutton, 1901)

Synonyms
- Agromyza fulvifrons Hutton, 1901

= Tethinosoma =

Genus of flies

Tethinosoma is a genus of beach flies in the family Canacidae. The only known species, T. fulvifrons, is from New Zealand. The species was first described in 1901 by Frederick Hutton. It has a distinctive greyish appearance and can be found on the seashore.

== Taxonomy ==
This species was first described as Agromyza fulvifrons in 1901 by entomologist Frederick Hutton. In 1930, it was shifted to the genus Tethinosoma, of which it is the only member. The holotype specimen is stored in Canterbury Museum.

== Description ==
As an adult, the body is around 3.35mm in length and has a wingspan of 3.25mm. It has a distinctive grey body colour. The antennae itself is reddish brown and has an arista (long bristle attached to the antennae) which is very short hairs and coloured brown at its base. The head and thorax are dusted grey and have numerous hairs. Each wing has brownish veins and is slightly cloudy in colour at the tip. The abdomen is greyish brown. Each leg is greyish except at the tarsi of the first and second leg which is greyish brown and the third leg which is yellowish-brown.

== Distribution and habitat ==
The fly is endemic to New Zealand where it known from scattered localities throughout the country. It appears to live along the seashore.
