= Canacea =

Scientific classification
- Kingdom: Animalia
- Phylum: Arthropoda
- Clade: Pancrustacea
- Class: Insecta
- Order: Diptera
- Family: Canacidae
- Tribe: Dynomiellini
- Genus: Canacea; Cresson, 1924

Type species
- Canacea macateei Malloch, 1924

Genus of flies

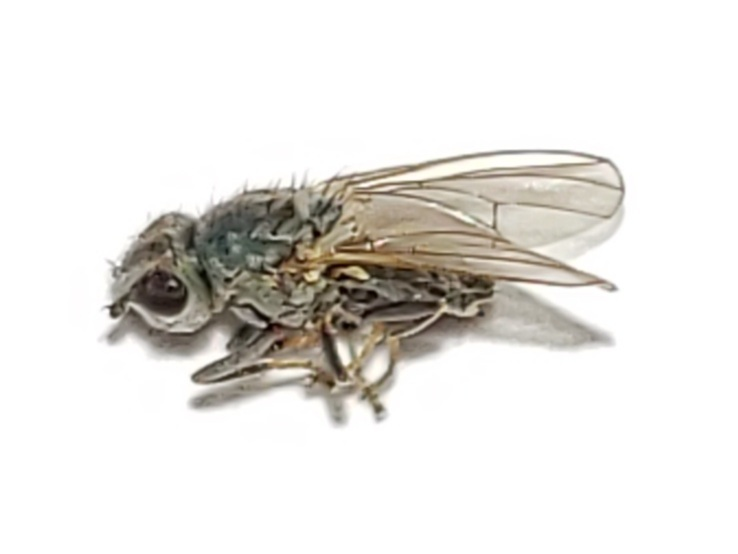

Canacea is a genus of beach flies in the family Canacidae. All known species are Nearctic or Neotropical.

== Species ==
- C. macateei Malloch, 1924
- C. currani (Wirth, 1970)
- C. aldrichi (Cresson, 1936)
- C. snodgrassii (Coquillett, 1901)
