= Isocanace =

Scientific classification
- Kingdom: Animalia
- Phylum: Arthropoda
- Clade: Pancrustacea
- Class: Insecta
- Order: Diptera
- Family: Canacidae
- Tribe: Dynomiellini
- Genus: Isocanace; Mathis, 1982

Type species
- Isocanace briani Mathis, 1982

Genus of flies

Isocanace is a genus of beach flies in the family Canacidae. All known species are Australasian or Afrotropical.

== Species ==
- I. albiceps (Malloch, 1925)
- I. australis Mathis, 1982
- I. briani Mathis, 1982
- I. flava (Canzoneri & Meneghini, 1969)
