= Chaetocanace =

Scientific classification
- Kingdom: Animalia
- Phylum: Arthropoda
- Clade: Pancrustacea
- Class: Insecta
- Order: Diptera
- Family: Canacidae
- Tribe: Dynomiellini
- Genus: Chaetocanace; Hendel, 1914

Type species
- Canace biseta Hendel, 1913

Genus of flies

Chaetocanace is a genus of beach flies in the family Canacidae. All known species are Asian or Australasian.

== Species ==
- C. brincki Delfinado, 1975
- C. biseta (Hendel, 1913)
