= Trichocanace =

Scientific classification
- Kingdom: Animalia
- Phylum: Arthropoda
- Clade: Pancrustacea
- Class: Insecta
- Order: Diptera
- Family: Canacidae
- Tribe: Dynomiellini
- Genus: Trichocanace; Wirth, 1951

Type species
- Trichocanace sinensis Wirth, 1951

Genus of flies

Trichocanace is a genus of beach flies, insects in the family Canacidae. All known species are Australasian, Indomalayan, or Afrotropical.

== Species ==
- T. atra Wirth, 1964
- T. marksae Wirth, 1964
- T. sinensis Wirth, 1951
