= Dynomiella =

Scientific classification
- Kingdom: Animalia
- Phylum: Arthropoda
- Clade: Pancrustacea
- Class: Insecta
- Order: Diptera
- Family: Canacidae
- Tribe: Dynomiellini
- Genus: Dynomiella; Giordani Soika, 1956

Type species
- Dynomiella arenicola Giordani Soika, 1956 = Dynomiella stuckenbergi (Wirth, 1956)

Genus of flies

Dynomiella is a genus of beach flies in the family Canacidae. All known species are Afrotropical.

== Species ==
- D. australica Mathis, 1996
- D. cala (Cresson, 1934)
- D. glauca (Wirth, 1956)
- D. spinosa (Wirth, 1956)
- D. stuckenbergi (Wirth, 1956)
