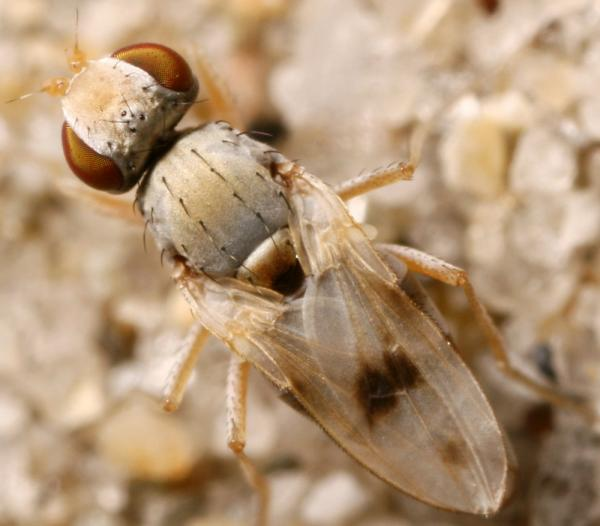
- Tethina lusitanica Munari, 2009

Scientific classification
- Kingdom: Animalia
- Phylum: Arthropoda
- Clade: Pancrustacea
- Class: Insecta
- Order: Diptera
- Section: Schizophora
- Subsection: Acalyptratae
- Superfamily: Carnoidea
- Family: Canacidae; Jones, 1906

Subfamilies
- Apetaeninae Mathis & Munari, 1996; Canacinae Jones, 1906; Horaismopterinae Sabrosky, 1978; Nocticanacinae Mathis, 1982; Zaleinae McAlpine, 1985; Tethininae Hendel, 1916

Synonyms
- Canaceidae Hendel, 1916

= Canacidae =

Family of flies

Canacidae, incorrectly Canaceidae, or beach flies, surf or surge flies, is a family of Diptera. As of 2010, 307 species in 27 genera. The family now includes Tethininae as a subfamily.

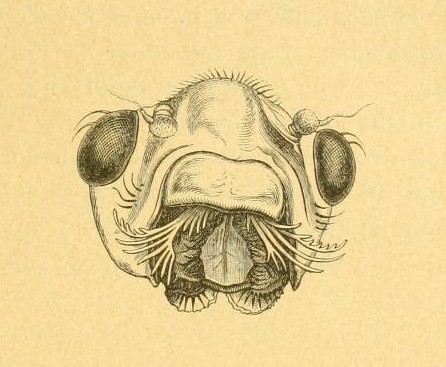
face on view of the head of Canace ranula, Loew

Wing venation

== Family description ==
For terms see Morphology of Diptera.

Minute (1.6–5 mm) yellow, grey or grey-brown pruinose flies with whitish to greyish markings. The head is large with small antenna bearing bare to pubescent arista. The "mouth" is a large oval opening. There are three or four pairs of orbital bristles on the head directed outward (inset upswept). Postvertical bristles are absent but diverging pseudopostocellar bristles are present. Other head bristles present are ocellar bristles, 2-5 pairs of frontal bristles, curving outward, interfrontal bristles and vibrissae ("whiskers"). The genae are high with 1 or more upcurving bristles. Tibiae are without a dorsal preapical bristle.

The wing is unmarked in almost all species. The costa has a subcostal break; the subcosta is parallel to vein R1 and merging with that vein just before the costa. Tibiae without dorsal preapical bristle.

See Drawings of Canace.

== Classification ==
- Subfamily Canacinae Jones, 1906
  - Tribe Canacini Jones, 1906
    - Canace Haliday in Curtis, 1837
  - Tribe Dynomiellini Mathis, 1982
    - Canacea Cresson, 1924
    - Chaetocanace Hendel, 1914
    - Dynomiella Giordani Soika, 1956
    - Isocanace Mathis, 1982
    - Trichocanace Wirth, 1951
    - Xanthocanace Hendel, 1914
- Subfamily Apetaeninae Mathis & Munari, 1996
  - Apetaenus Eaton, 1875
- Subfamily Horaismopterinae Sabrosky, 1978
  - Horaismoptera Hendel, 1907
  - Tethinosoma Malloch, 1930
- Subfamily Nocticanacinae Mathis, 1982
  - Canaceoides Cresson, 1934
  - Nocticanace Malloch, 1933
  - Paracanace Mathis & Wirth, 1978
  - Procanace Hendel, 1913
- Subfamily Tethininae Hendel, 1916
  - Afrotethina Munari, 1986
  - Dasyrhicnoessa Hendel, 1934
  - Plesiotethina Munari, 2000
  - Pseudorhicnoessa Malloch, 1914
  - Sigaloethina Munari, 2004
  - Tethina Haliday in Curtis, 1837
  - Thitena Munari, 2004
- Subfamily Zaleinae McAlpine, 1985
  - Zalea McAlpine, 1985
  - Suffomyia Freidberg, 1995

== Biology ==
Canacidae are mostly intertidal flies. They are found along sea coasts, on the surface of small water bodies, saline and fresh, at places protected from wind. They feed on Infusoria and other minute organisms.
