= Pyrgota fenestrata =

Scientific classification
- Domain: Eukaryota
- Kingdom: Animalia
- Phylum: Arthropoda
- Class: Insecta
- Order: Diptera
- Family: Pyrgotidae
- Genus: Pyrgota
- Species: P. fenestrata

Binomial name
- Pyrgota fenestrata (Macquart, 1851)

Synonyms
- Oxycephala fenestrata Macquart, 1851; Pyrgota vespertilio Gerstacker, 1860

Species of fly

Pyrgota fenestrata is a species of fly in the family Pyrgotidae. It is found in the Southeastern United States.
