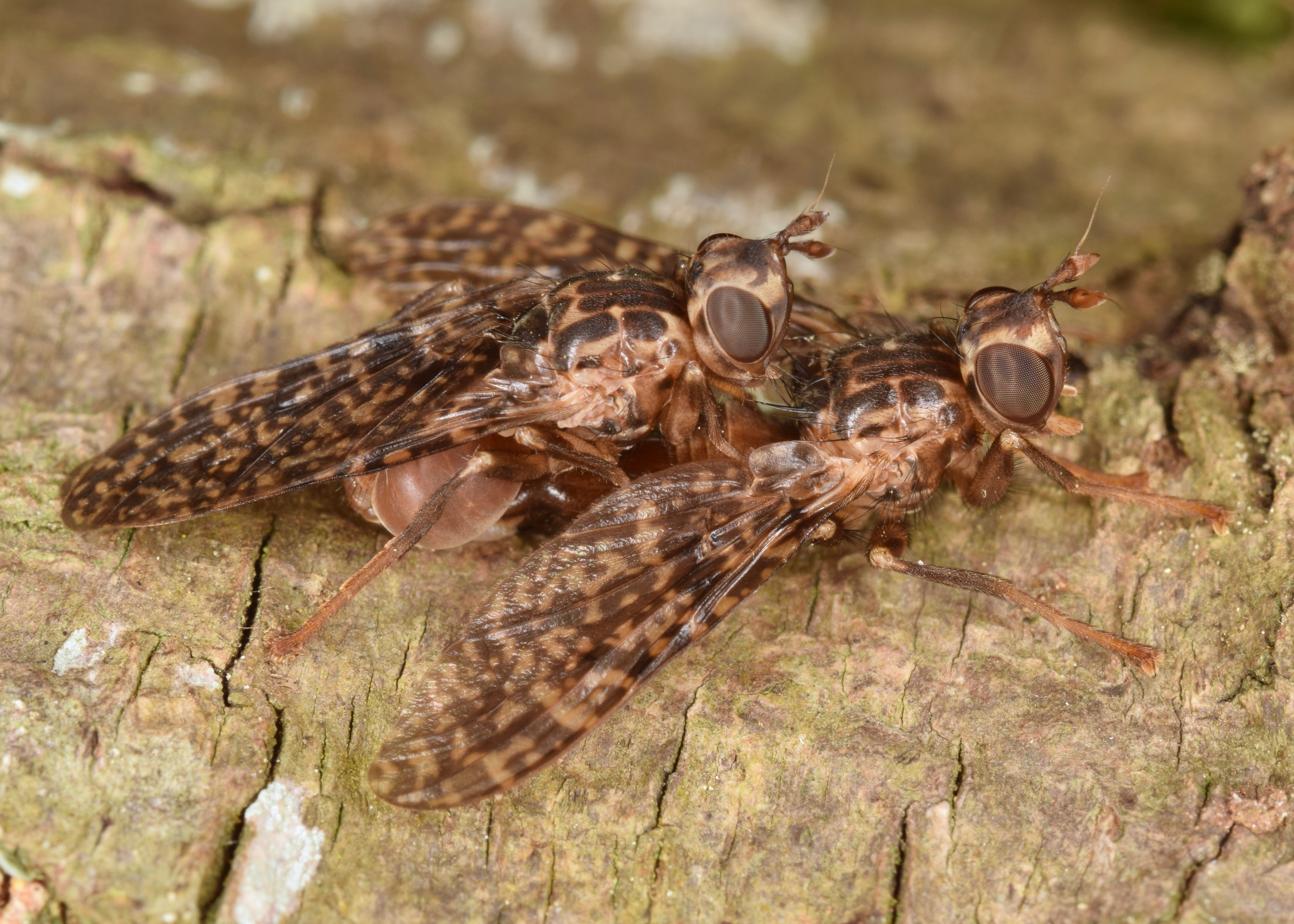

Scientific classification
- Domain: Eukaryota
- Kingdom: Animalia
- Phylum: Arthropoda
- Class: Insecta
- Order: Diptera
- Family: Pyrgotidae
- Genus: Pyrgota
- Species: P. valida

Binomial name
- Pyrgota valida (Harris, 1841)

= Pyrgota valida =

Species of fly

Pyrgota valida is a species of fly in the family Pyrgotidae.
