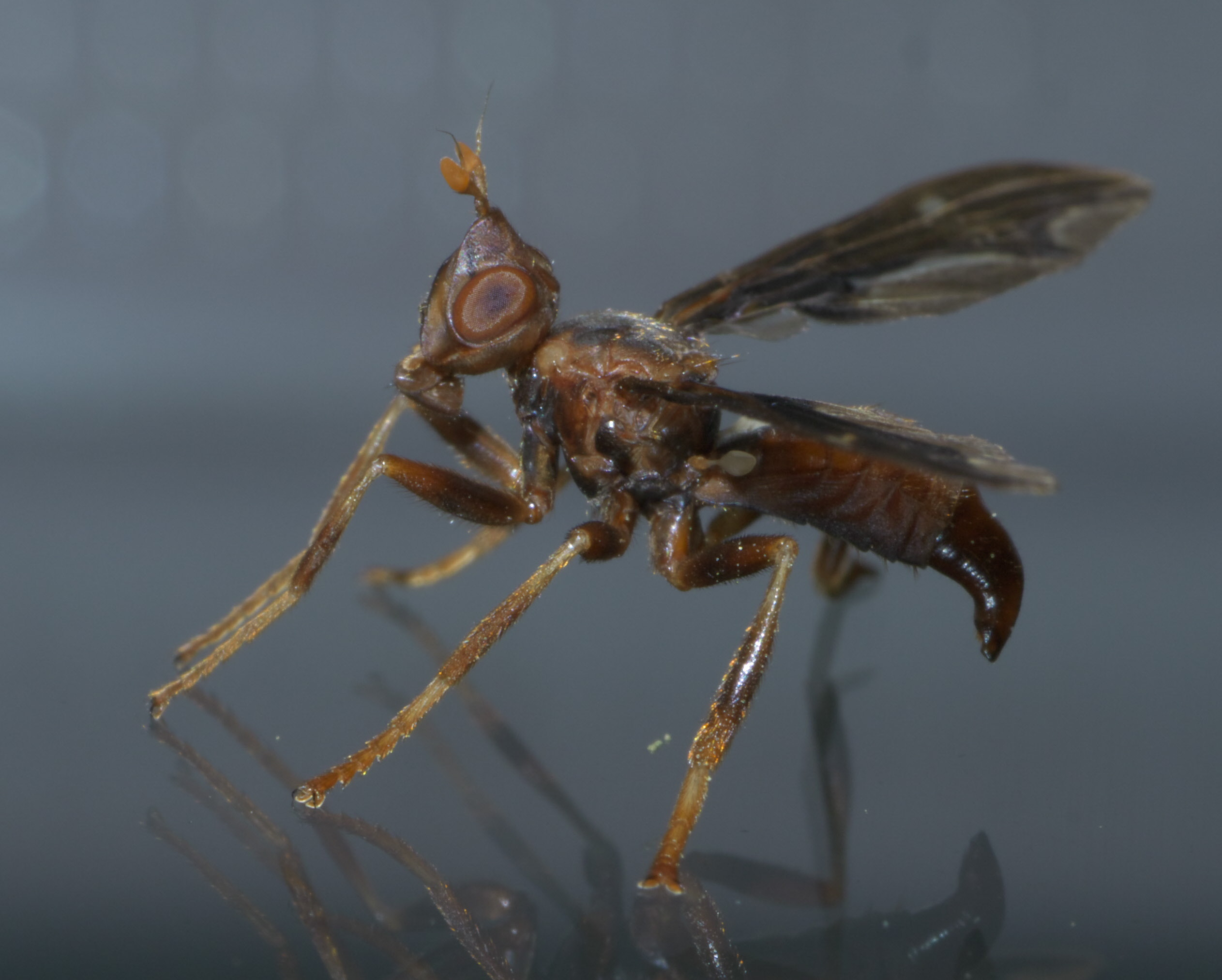

Scientific classification
- Domain: Eukaryota
- Kingdom: Animalia
- Phylum: Arthropoda
- Class: Insecta
- Order: Diptera
- Family: Pyrgotidae
- Genus: Pyrgota
- Species: P. undata

Binomial name
- Pyrgota undata Wiedemann, 1830

Synonyms
- Myopa nigripennis Gray, 1832; Oxcephala fuscipennis Macquart, 1843; Pyrgota pterophorina Gerstacker, 1860

= Pyrgota undata =

Species of fly

Pyrgota undata, the waved light fly, is a species of fly in the family Pyrgotidae.

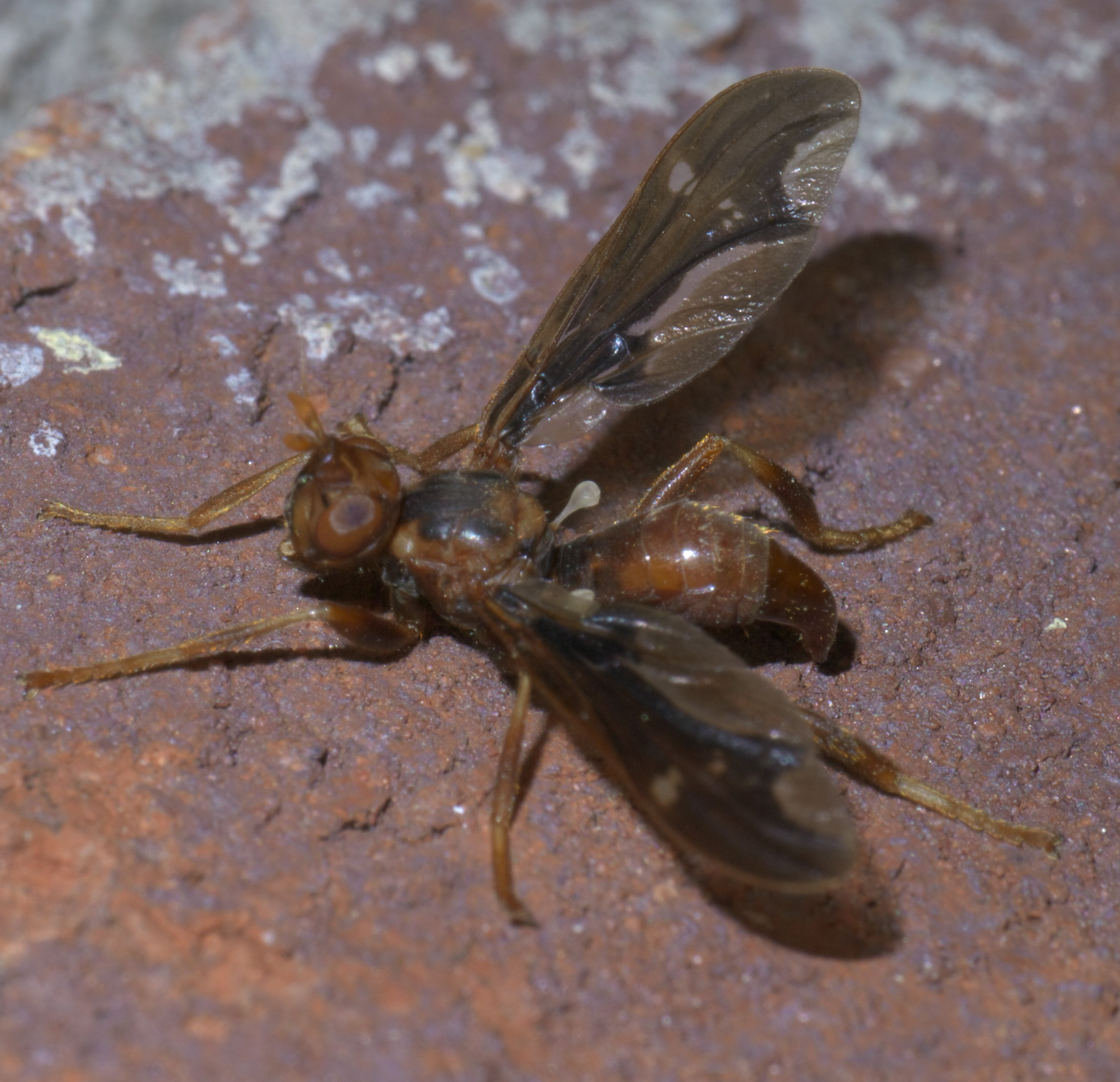
Waved light fly, Pyrgota undata

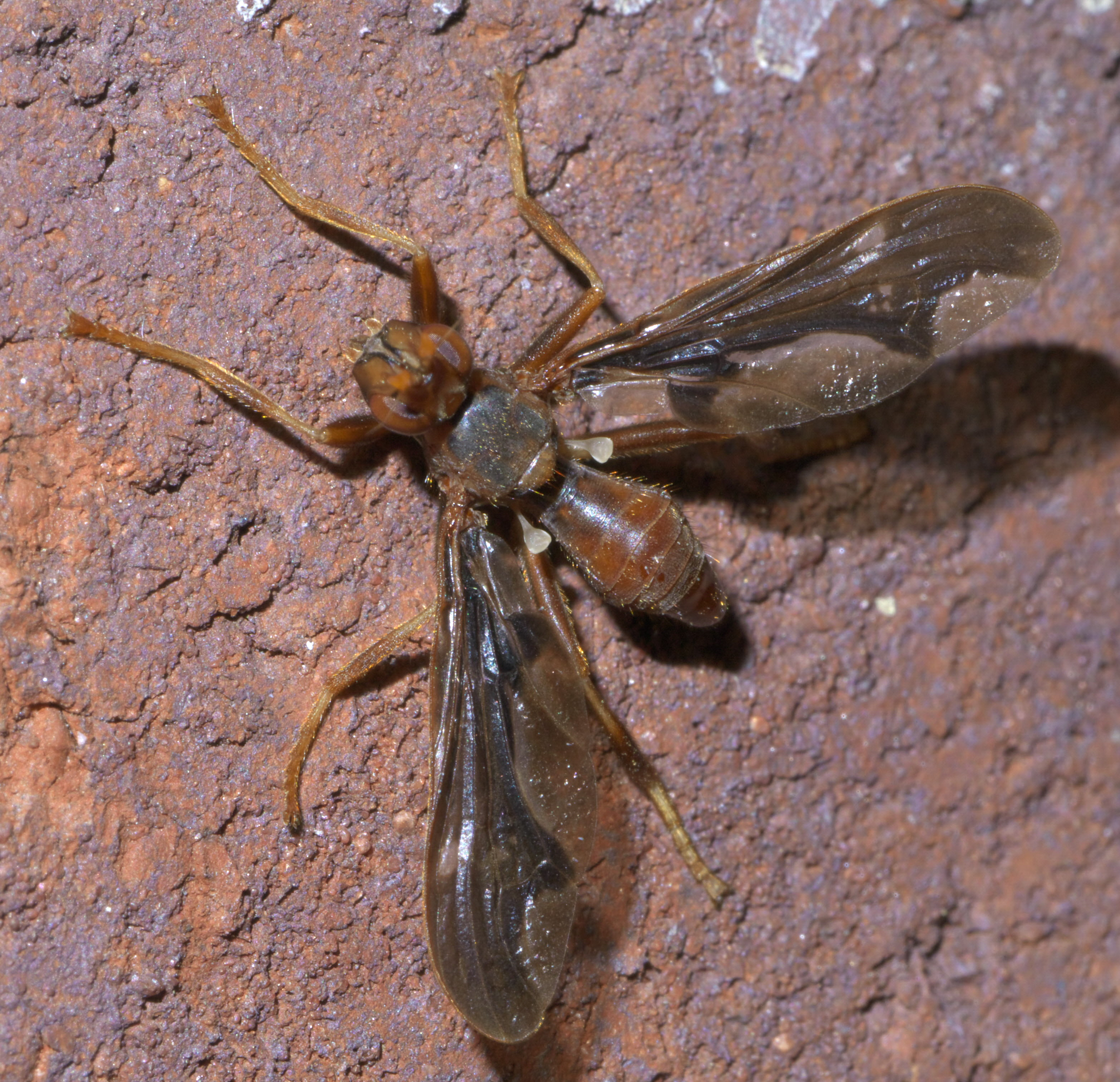
Waved light fly, Pyrgota undata
