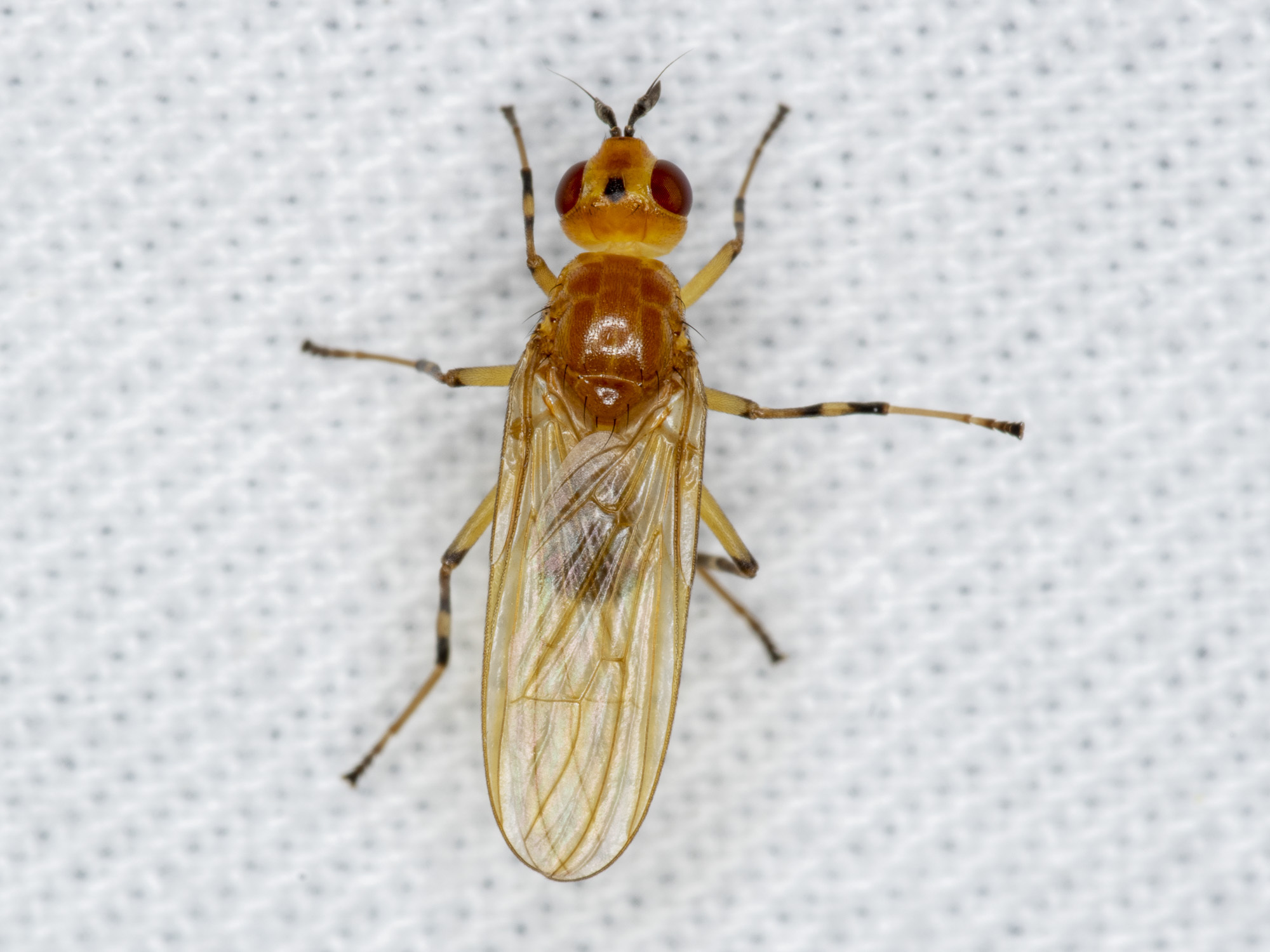
- Facilina tertia

Scientific classification
- Kingdom: Animalia
- Phylum: Arthropoda
- Class: Insecta
- Order: Diptera
- Family: Pyrgotidae
- Genus: Facilina; Paramonov, 1958

Type species
- Facilina campbelli Paramonov, 1958

= Facilina =

Genus of flies

Facilina is a genus of flies in the family Pyrgotidae.

== Species ==
The following species are recognised in the genus Facilina:

- F. campbelli Paramonov, 1958
- F. commoni Paramonov, 1958
- F. tertia Paramonov, 1958
