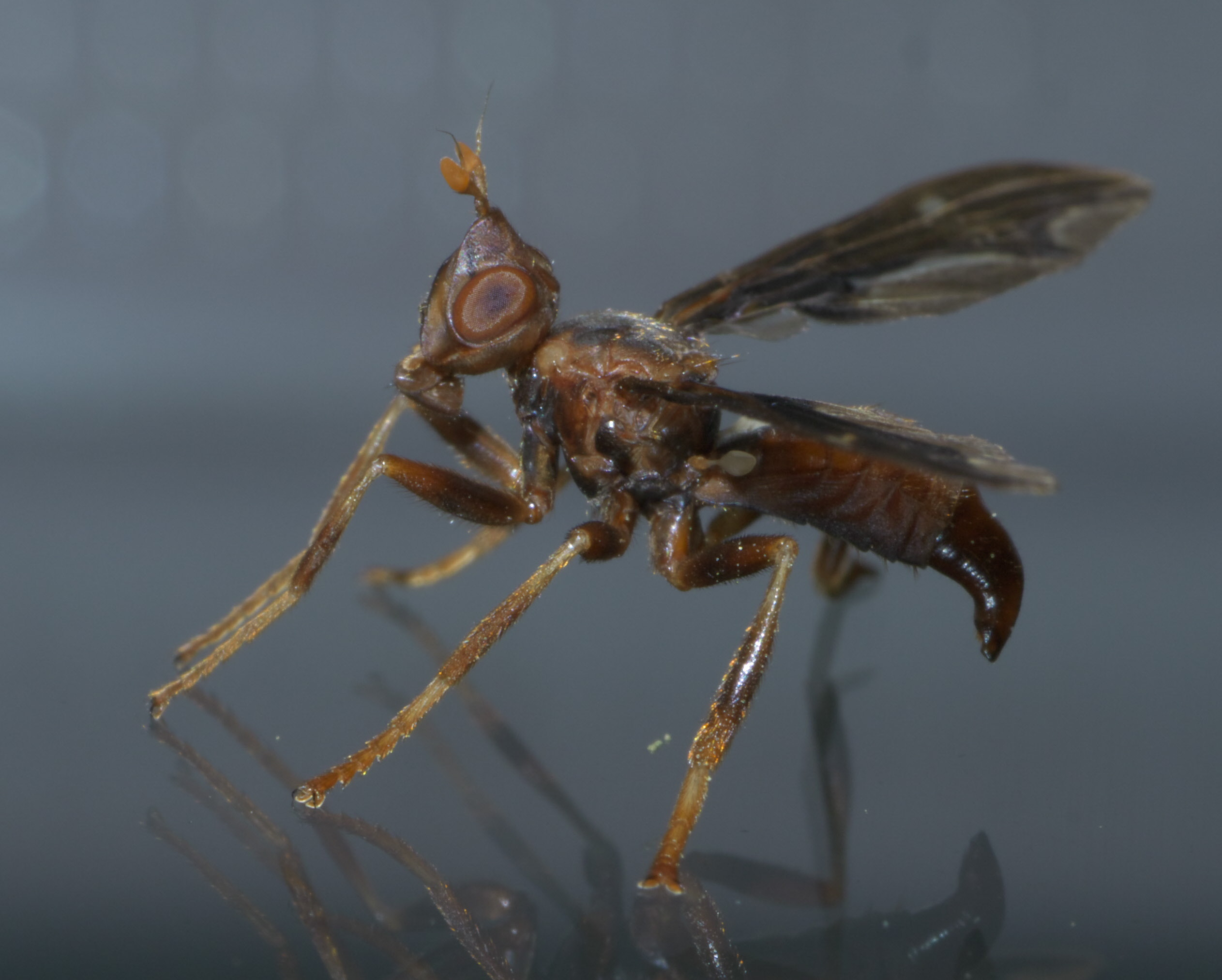
- Pyrgota undata

Scientific classification
- Domain: Eukaryota
- Kingdom: Animalia
- Phylum: Arthropoda
- Class: Insecta
- Order: Diptera
- Family: Pyrgotidae
- Genus: Pyrgota; Wiedemann, 1830

= Pyrgota =

Genus of flies

Pyrgota is a genus of flies in the family Pyrgotidae. There are about 10 described species in Pyrgota.

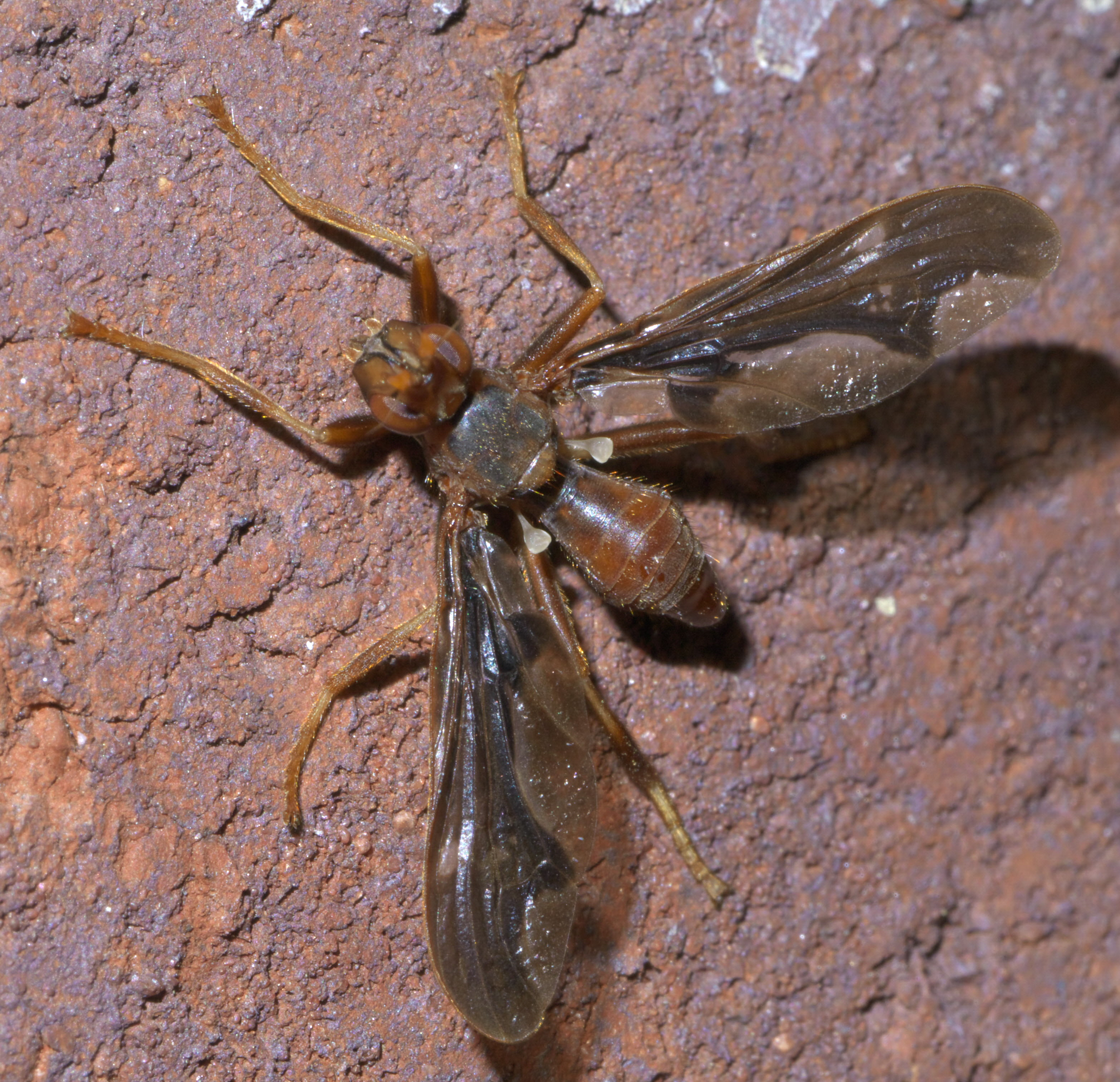
Pyrgota undata

== Species ==
These 10 species belong to the genus Pyrgota:

- Pyrgota dichaetus (Steyskal, 1978)
- Pyrgota fenestrata (Macquart, 1851)
- Pyrgota ilona Aczel, 1956
- Pyrgota longipes Hendel, 1908
- Pyrgota lugens Wulp, 1898
- Pyrgota maculipennis (Macquart, 1846)
- Pyrgota nelsoni Kondratieff & Fitzgerald, 1993
- Pyrgota shewelli (Steyskal, 1978)
- Pyrgota undata Wiedemann, 1830 (waved light fly)
- Pyrgota valida (Harris, 1841)
