= Lopadops =

Scientific classification
- Kingdom: Animalia
- Phylum: Arthropoda
- Clade: Pancrustacea
- Class: Insecta
- Order: Diptera
- Family: Pyrgotidae
- Genus: Lopadops; Enderlein, 1942

Type species
- Lopadops nigerrimus Enderlein, 1942

Genus of flies

Lopadops is a genus of flies in the family Pyrgotidae.

== Species ==
- L. nigerrimus Enderlein, 1942
