= Campylocera =

Scientific classification
- Kingdom: Animalia
- Phylum: Arthropoda
- Class: Insecta
- Order: Diptera
- Family: Pyrgotidae
- Genus: Campylocera; Macquart, 1844

Type species
- Campylocera ferruginea Macquart, 1844

Synonyms
- Prosyrogaster Rondani, 1875; Tephritocampylocera Hendel, 1934; Dicrostira Enderlein, 1942; Hexamerinx Enderlein, 1942; Rhagostira Enderlein, 1942; Teliophleps Enderlein, 1942; Campilocera Chen, 1947 (missp.)

Genus of flies

Campylocera is a genus of flies in the family Pyrgotidae.

== Species ==
- C. angustigenis Hendel, 1914
- C. bokumaensis Vanschuytbroeck, 1963
- C. brevicornis Hendel, 1908
- C. chelyonothus (Rondani, 1875)
- C. clemelis Séguy, 1935
- C. denticauda Enderlein, 1942
- C. ferruginea Macquart, 1843
- C. fuscipes Wulp, 1885
- C. hirsuta Aldrich, 1928
- C. hyalipennis Malloch, 1929
- C. kenyana Hendel, 1934
- C. latigenis Hendel, 1914
- C. latipennis Séguy, 1933
- C. longicornis Wulp, 1885
- C. lurida Enderlein, 1942
- C. maculifera Hendel, 1914
- C. marmorata Enderlein, 1912
- C. mindanensis Hennig, 1936
- C. myopa Hendel, 1914
- C. myopina Wulp, 1880
- C. nigridorsum Enderlein, 1942
- C. octomaculata Enderlein, 1942
- C. oculata Hendel, 1914
- C. ornatipennis Hennig, 1936
- C. partitigena Enderlein, 1942
- C. piceiventris Hendel, 1914
- C. pleuralis Hendel, 1914
- C. proxima Séguy, 1933
- C. robusta Wulp, 1880
- C. rodhaini Vanschuytbroeck, 1963
- C. rufina Bezzi, 1916
- C. ruwenzoriensis Vanschuytbroeck, 1963
- C. stigmatica Séguy, 1933
- C. tessmanni Enderlein, 1942
- C. thoracalis Hendel, 1914
- C. unicolor Becker, 1909
- C. varipennis Curran, 1928
- C. squalidus (Walker, 1861)
- C. partitigena (Enderlein, 1942)
- C. setosa (Giebel, 1862)
- C. yurikoae (Azuma, 2001)
