= Eupyrgota =

Scientific classification
- Kingdom: Animalia
- Phylum: Arthropoda
- Class: Insecta
- Order: Diptera
- Family: Pyrgotidae
- Genus: Eupyrgota; Coquillett, 1898

Type species
- Eupyrgota luteola Coquillett, 1898

Synonyms
- Apyrgota Hendel, 1909; Peltodasia Enderlein, 1942; Taeniomastix Enderlein, 1942

Genus of flies

Eupyrgota is a genus of flies in the family Pyrgotidae. A number of its species were originally from Apyrgota and Taeniomastix, which in 2014 were made synonyms of Eupyrgota by V. Korneyev.

== Species ==
- Subgenus Eupyrgota Coquillett, 1898
  - E. aequalis (Malloch, 1939)
  - E. alienata (Walker, 1862) (= E. scioida Hendel, 1908)
  - E. angustifrons (Bezzi, 1914)
  - E. armipes (Hendel, 1914)
  - E. brahma (Hendel, 1914) (= Adapsilia nocturna Bezzi, 1914)
  - E. caffra (Hendel, 1914)
  - E. crassipes V. Korneyev, 2006
  - E. echinata V. Korneyev, 2006
  - E. flavopilosa (Hendel, 1914)
  - E. furvimaculis Shi, 1996
  - E. fusca (Hendel, 1914)
  - E. latipennis (Walker, 1849)
  - E. luteola Coquillett, 1898
  - E. maculiala Shi, 1996
  - E. melancholica (Brunetti, 1929)
  - E. nyambene V. Korneyev, 2014
  - E. pekinensis Chen, 1947
  - E. pieli Chen, 1947
  - E. rugosigenis (Hendel, 1934)
  - E. similis Chen, 1947
  - E. sublatipennis (Brunetti, 1929)
  - E. varipennis (Curran, 1928)
  - E. vespiformis (Enderlein, 1942)
  - E. vulpina (Hendel, 1914)
  - E. wagae (Bigot, 1880)
- Subgenus Asipyrgota V. Korneyev, 2014
  - E. flaviseta (Aldrich, 1928)
- Subgenus Taeniomastix Enderlein, 1942
  - E. formosana Hennig, 1938
  - E. griseipennis (Hendel, 1933) (= Taeniomastix sumatrana Enderlein, 1942)
  - E. pictiventris (Hendel, 1914) (= Adapsilia facialis Hendel, 1933; E. tigrina Kim & Han, 2000)
  - E. saegeri (Vanschuytbroeck, 1963)
  - E. spinifemur (Hendel, 1934)
  - E. unicolor (Hendel, 1914)

Apyrgota marshalli Hendel, 1914 was transferred to Afropyrgota. Apyrgota breviventris Shi, 1996, Apyrgota fura Shi, 1996, Apyrgota jiangleensis Shi, 1994 and Apyrgota longa Shi, 1996 were transferred to Tylotrypes.
