= Clemaxia =

Scientific classification
- Kingdom: Animalia
- Phylum: Arthropoda
- Clade: Pancrustacea
- Class: Insecta
- Order: Diptera
- Family: Pyrgotidae
- Genus: Clemaxia; Enderlein, 1942

Type species
- Clemaxia angustipalpis Enderlein, 1942

Genus of flies

Clemaxia is a genus of flies in the family Pyrgotidae.

== Species ==
- C. adolfifriderici Enderlein, 1942
- C. angustiangulata Enderlein, 1942
- C. angusticornis Enderlein, 1942
- C. angustipalpis Enderlein, 1942
- C. flaviventris Mayer, 1953
- C. gracilis (Hendel, 1914)
