= Metropina =

Scientific classification
- Kingdom: Animalia
- Phylum: Arthropoda
- Clade: Pancrustacea
- Class: Insecta
- Order: Diptera
- Family: Pyrgotidae
- Genus: Metropina; Enderlein, 1942

Type species
- Metropina temporalis Enderlein, 1942

Genus of flies

Metropina is a genus of flies in the family Pyrgotidae.

== Species ==
- M. nigra Vanschuytbroeck, 1963
- M. richteri Steyskal, 1972
- M. temporalis Enderlein, 1942
