= Platynostira =

Scientific classification
- Kingdom: Animalia
- Phylum: Arthropoda
- Clade: Pancrustacea
- Class: Insecta
- Order: Diptera
- Family: Pyrgotidae
- Genus: Platynostira; Enderlein, 1942
- Species: P. turbata

Binomial name
- Platynostira turbata Enderlein, 1942

Genus of flies

Platynostira is a genus of flies in the family Pyrgotidae, containing a single species, Platynostira turbata.
