= Stirothrinax =

Scientific classification
- Kingdom: Animalia
- Phylum: Arthropoda
- Clade: Pancrustacea
- Class: Insecta
- Order: Diptera
- Family: Pyrgotidae
- Genus: Stirothrinax; Enderlein, 1942

Type species
- Stirothrinax cribratus Enderlein, 1942

Genus of flies

Stirothrinax is a genus of flies in the family Pyrgotidae.

== Species ==
- S. cribratus Enderlein, 1942
- S. knudseni Mayer, 1953
