= Tephritopyrgota =

Scientific classification
- Kingdom: Animalia
- Phylum: Arthropoda
- Class: Insecta
- Order: Diptera
- Family: Pyrgotidae
- Genus: Tephritopyrgota; Hendel, 1914

Type species
- Tephritopyrgota passerina Hendel, 1914

Synonyms
- Stypina Enderlein, 1942; Euthioza Enderlein, 1942

Genus of flies

Tephritopyrgota is a genus of flies in the family Pyrgotidae.

== Species ==
- T. abjecta (Adams, 1905)
- T. arota Séguy, 1935
- T. arotina Hennig, 1960
- T. belzebuth Hendel, 1914
- T. binodosa Hennig, 1960
- T. breviseta Hendel, 1934
- T. breviterebra Hennig, 1960
- T. chalybea Hennig, 1960
- T. cockerelli (Malloch, 1930)
- T. denticauda Hennig, 1960
- T. echinogaster Hennig, 1960
- T. falcicauda Hennig, 1960
- T. ferruginea (Walker, 1853)
- T. gowdeyi Malloch, 1929
- T. haltericauda Hennig, 1960
- T. hamicauda Hennig, 1960
- T. hirsuta Hendel, 1914
- T. kibatiensis Vanschuytbroeck, 1963
- T. laevigaster Hennig, 1960
- T. latigenis (Enderlein, 1942)
- T. longipalpis Hendel, 1934
- T. madagascariensis (Enderlein, 1942)
- T. miliaria Hendel, 1933
- T. monochaeta Hennig, 1960
- T. munroi Bruggen, 1961
- T. musosaensis Vanschuytbroeck, 1963
- T. nigrocristata (Enderlein, 1942)
- T. nigromaculata Hennig, 1960
- T. nodicauda Hennig, 1960
- T. nubilipennis (Wulp, 1885)
- T. obtusicauda Hennig, 1960
- T. passerina Hendel, 1914
- T. penicillaticoxa (Enderlein, 1942)
- T. praevariegata Vanschuytbroeck, 1963
- T. rufonigera Hennig, 1960
- T. rutricauda Hennig, 1960
- T. similis Hendel, 1934
- T. spinosa Hennig, 1960
- T. stylata Hendel, 1914
- T. sumatrana (Enderlein, 1942)
- T. tenuis Hendel, 1914
- T. variegata Hendel, 1934
- T. vesicatoria Hendel, 1914
