= Siridapha =

Scientific classification
- Kingdom: Animalia
- Phylum: Arthropoda
- Clade: Pancrustacea
- Class: Insecta
- Order: Diptera
- Family: Pyrgotidae
- Genus: Siridapha; Enderlein, 1942

Type species
- Siridapha ophionea Enderlein, 1942

Genus of flies

Siridapha is a genus of flies in the family Pyrgotidae.

== Species ==
- S. filipalpis Enderlein, 1942
- S. mulunguensis Vanschuytbroeck, 1963
- S. ophionea Enderlein, 1942
