= Boreothrinax =

Scientific classification
- Kingdom: Animalia
- Phylum: Arthropoda
- Class: Insecta
- Order: Diptera
- Family: Pyrgotidae
- Genus: Boreothrinax; Steyskal, 1978

Type species
- Oxycephala maculipennis Macquart, 1846

Genus of flies

Boreothrinax is a genus of flies in the family Pyrgotidae.

== Species ==
- B. debilis (Osten Sacken, 1877)
- B. dichaetus Steyskal, 1978
- B. filiola (Loew, 1876)
- B. maculipennis (Macquart, 1846)
- B. shewelli Steyskal, 1978
