= Tropidothrinax =

Scientific classification
- Kingdom: Animalia
- Phylum: Arthropoda
- Clade: Pancrustacea
- Class: Insecta
- Order: Diptera
- Family: Pyrgotidae
- Genus: Tropidothrinax; Enderlein, 1942
- Species: T. boliviensis

Binomial name
- Tropidothrinax boliviensis Enderlein, 1942

Genus of flies

Tropidothrinax is a genus of flies in the family Pyrgotidae, containing a single species, Tropidothrinax boliviensis.
