= Acropyrgota =

Scientific classification
- Kingdom: Animalia
- Phylum: Arthropoda
- Class: Insecta
- Order: Diptera
- Family: Pyrgotidae
- Genus: Acropyrgota; Hendel, 1914

Type species
- Acropyrgota flavescens Hendel, 1914

Genus of flies

Acropyrgota is a genus of flies in the family Pyrgotidae.

== Species ==
- A. cribripennis Bezzi, 1929 (Synonym of Cardiacera cribripennis (Bezzi, 1929))
- A. flavescens Hendel, 1914
