= Plectrobrachis =

Scientific classification
- Kingdom: Animalia
- Phylum: Arthropoda
- Clade: Pancrustacea
- Class: Insecta
- Order: Diptera
- Family: Pyrgotidae
- Genus: Plectrobrachis; Enderlein, 1942
- Species: P. filigena

Binomial name
- Plectrobrachis filigena Enderlein, 1942

Genus of flies

Plectrobrachis is a genus of flies in the family Pyrgotidae, containing a single species, Plectrobrachis filigena.
