= Lygiohypotyphla =

Scientific classification
- Kingdom: Animalia
- Phylum: Arthropoda
- Class: Insecta
- Order: Diptera
- Family: Pyrgotidae
- Genus: Lygiohypotyphla; Enderlein, 1942

Type species
- Prohypotyphla saegeri Hendel, 1934

Genus of flies

Lygiohypotyphla is a genus of flies in the family Pyrgotidae.

== Species ==
- L. bicolor Steyskal, 1972
- L. hyalipennis Vanschuytbroeck, 1963
- L. nigripennis (Hendel, 1934)
- L. ruwenzoriensis Vanschuytbroeck, 1963
- L. saegeri Vanschuytbroeck, 1963
