= Toxopyrgota =

Scientific classification
- Kingdom: Animalia
- Phylum: Arthropoda
- Class: Insecta
- Order: Diptera
- Family: Pyrgotidae
- Genus: Toxopyrgota; Hendel, 1914

Type species
- Toxopyrgota inclinata Hendel, 1914

Genus of flies

Toxopyrgota is a genus of flies in the family Pyrgotidae.

== Species ==
- T. inclinata Hendel, 1914
