= Leptopyrgota =

Scientific classification
- Kingdom: Animalia
- Phylum: Arthropoda
- Class: Insecta
- Order: Diptera
- Family: Pyrgotidae
- Genus: Leptopyrgota; Hendel, 1914

Type species
- Leptopyrgota amplipennis Hendel, 1914

Genus of flies

Leptopyrgota is a genus of flies in the family Pyrgotidae.

== Species ==
- L. accolens Bernardi, 1992
- L. albitarsis Aczél, 1956
- L. amplipennis Hendel, 1914
- L. andrei Bernardi, 1992
- L. annulipes Aczél, 1956
- L. apilosa Aczél, 1956
- L. apposita Bernardi, 1992
- L. brevipennis Bernardi, 1992
- L. caelifera Bernardi, 1992
- L. celeriuscula Bernardi, 1992
- L. cocta Bernardi, 1992
- L. costalimai Aczél, 1956
- L. definienda Bernardi, 1992
- L. ensifera Bernardi, 1992
- L. fibulata (Enderlein, 1942)
- L. flavipes Bernardi, 1992
- L. gracilenta Bernardi, 1992
- L. hesterna Bernardi, 1992
- L. isabelae Bernardi, 1992
- L. juniae Bernardi, 1992
- L. lenkoi Bernardi, 1992
- L. liae Bernardi, 1992
- L. marci Bernardi, 1992
- L. mehelyi Aczél, 1956
- L. minensis Bernardi, 1992
- L. minuta Hennig, 1937
- L. nigrifrons Aczél, 1956
- L. pulchra Aczél, 1956
- L. quarens Bernardi, 1992
- L. sahlbergiana Frey, 1918
- L. sarae Bernardi, 1992
- L. tibialis Bernardi, 1992
- L. undulata Becker, 1919
