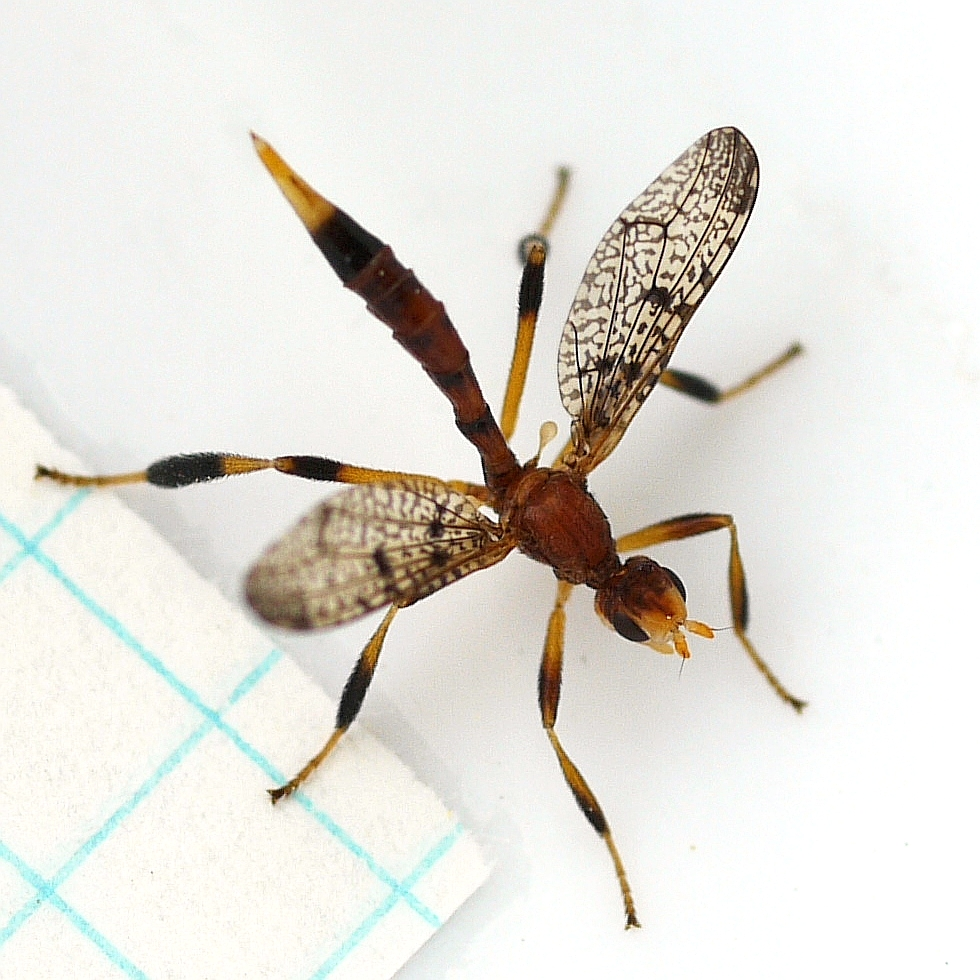
- Pyrgotella chagnoni

Scientific classification
- Kingdom: Animalia
- Phylum: Arthropoda
- Class: Insecta
- Order: Diptera
- Section: Schizophora
- Subsection: Acalyptratae
- Superfamily: Tephritoidea
- Family: Pyrgotidae; Loew, 1868

Genera
- see text

= Pyrgotidae =

Family of flies

The Pyrgotidae are an unusual family of flies (Diptera), one of only two families of Cyclorrhapha that lack ocelli. Most species are "picture-winged" (i.e., have patterns of bands or spots on the wings), as is typical among the Tephritoidea, but unlike other tephritoids, they are endoparasitoids; the females pursue scarab beetles in flight, laying an egg on the beetle's back under the elytra where the beetle cannot reach it. The egg hatches and the fly larva enters the body cavity of the beetle, feeding and eventually killing the host before pupating. In the United States, some species of Pyrgota and Sphecomyiella can be quite common in areas where their host beetles (typically the genus Phyllophaga, or "June beetles") are abundant. Like their host beetles, these flies are primarily nocturnal, and are often attracted to artificial lights.

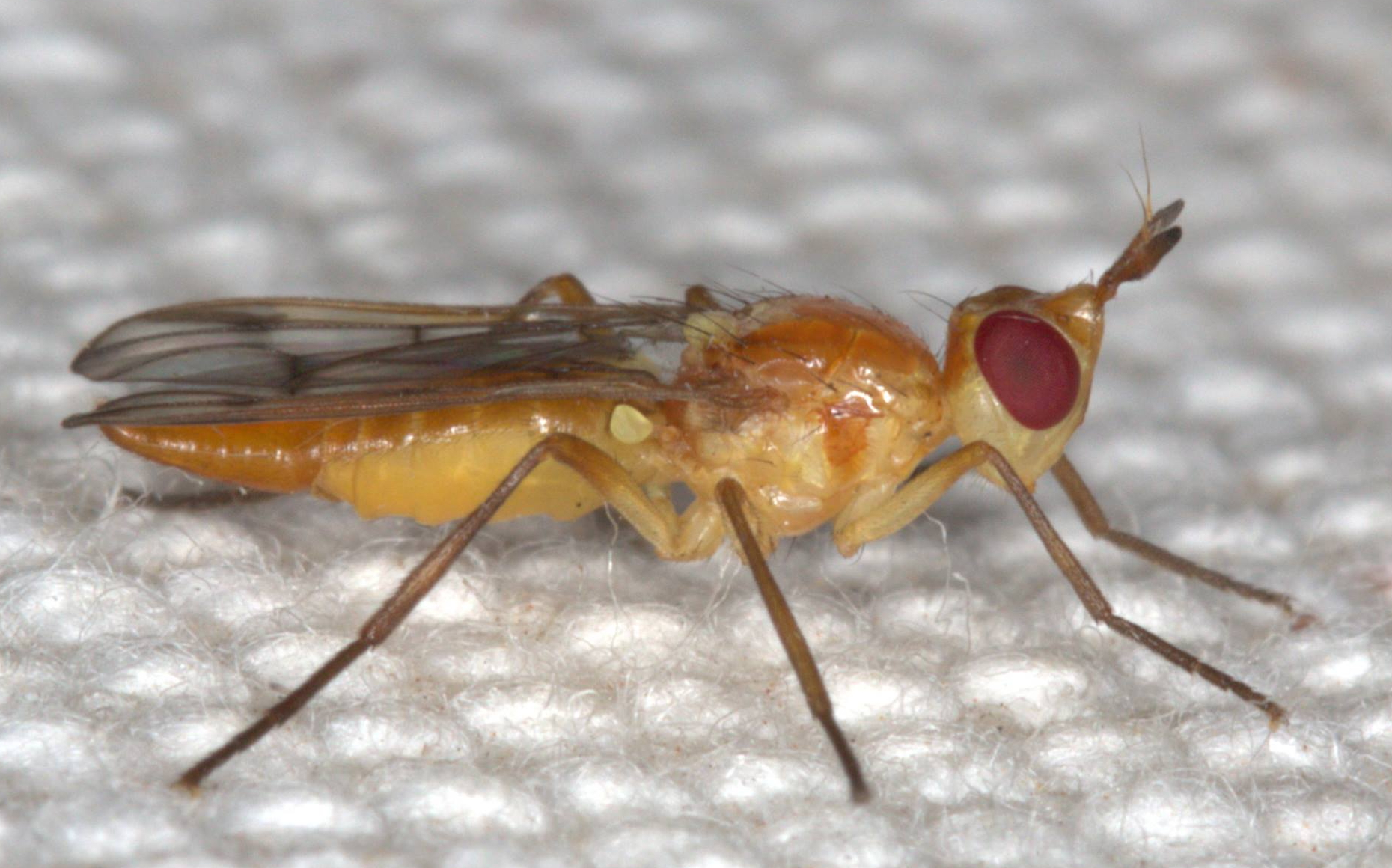
Female of species of Pyrgotidae, showing the prominent ovipositor

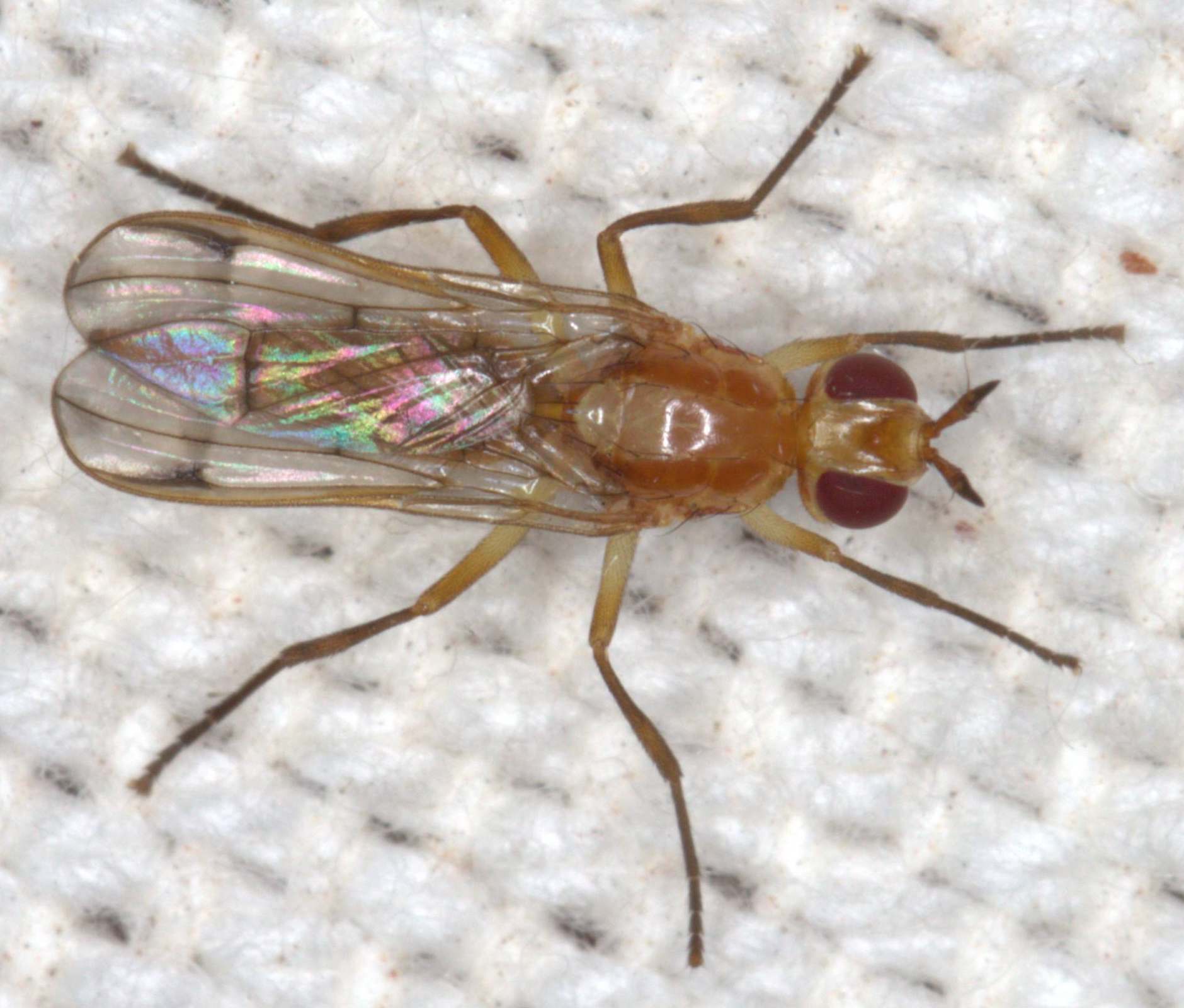
Dorsal aspect of same fly; note the absence of the ocelli

== Genera ==
- Acropyrgota Hendel, 1914
- Adapsilia Waga, 1842
- Adapsona Paramonov, 1958
- Afropyrgota V. Korneyev, 2015
- Austromyia Hardy, 1954
- Boreothrinax Steyskal, 1978
- Campylocera Macquart, 1843
- Cardiacera Macquart, 1847
- Carrerapyrgota Aczél, 1956
- Clemaxia Enderlein, 1942
- Commoniella Paramonov, 1958
- Descoleia Aczel, 1956
- Diasteneura Hendel, 1908
- Epice Paramonov, 1958
- Eumorphomyia Hendel, 1907
- Eupyrgota Coquillett, 1898 (Synonyms: Apyrgota Hendel, 1909; Taeniomastix Enderlein, 1942)
- Facilina Paramonov, 1958
- Frontalia Malloch, 1929
- Geloemyia Hendel, 1908
- Hendelpyrgota Vanschuytbroeck, 1963
- Hypotyphla Loew, 1873
- Leptopyrgota Hendel, 1914
- Lopadops Enderlein, 1942
- Lygiohypotyphla Enderlein, 1942
- Maenomenus Bezzi, 1929
- Metropina Enderlein, 1942
- Neopyrgota Hendel, 1934
- Neotoxura Malloch, 1929
- Parageloemyia Hendel, 1934
- Platynostira Enderlein, 1942
- Plectrobrachis Enderlein, 1942
- Porpomastix Enderlein, 1942
- Prodalmannia Bezzi, 1929
- Prohypotyphla Hendel, 1934
- Pyrgota Wiedemann, 1830
- Pyrgotella Curran, 1934
- Pyrgotina Malloch, 1929
- Pyrgotomyia Hendel, 1934
- Pyrgotosoma Malloch, 1933
- Siridapha Enderlein, 1942
- Stirothrinax Enderlein, 1942
- Tephritohypotyphla Vanschuytbroeck, 1963
- Tephritopyrgota Hendel, 1914
- Toxopyrgota Hendel, 1914
- Toxura Macquart, 1851
- Trichempodia Malloch, 1930
- Tropidothrinax Enderlein, 1942
- Tylotrypes Bezzi, 1914
