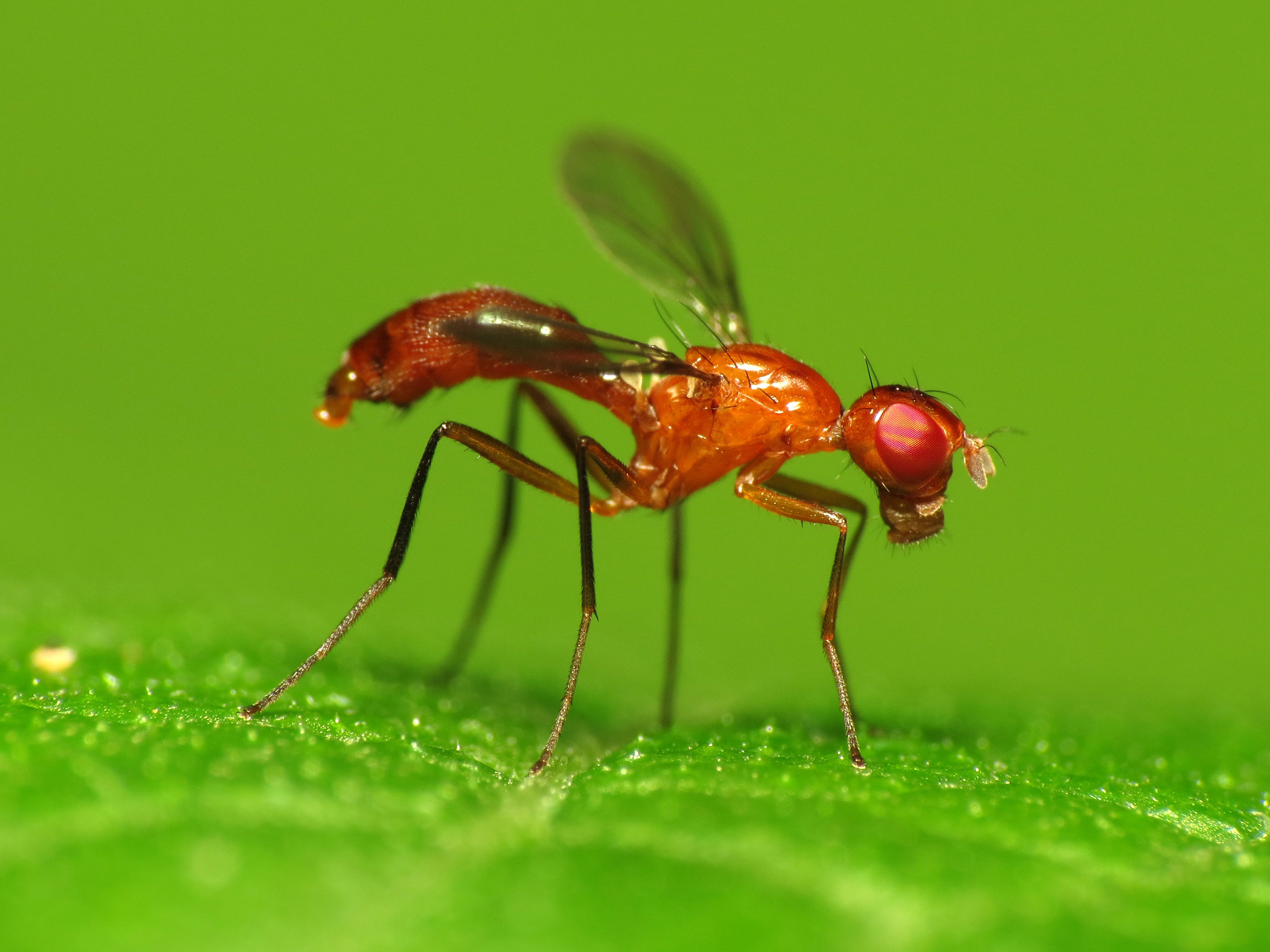

Scientific classification
- Domain: Eukaryota
- Kingdom: Animalia
- Phylum: Arthropoda
- Class: Insecta
- Order: Diptera
- Family: Richardiidae
- Genus: Sepsisoma
- Species: S. flavescens

Binomial name
- Sepsisoma flavescens Johnson, 1900

= Sepsisoma flavescens =

Species of fly

Sepsisoma flavescens is a species of fly in the family Richardiidae.

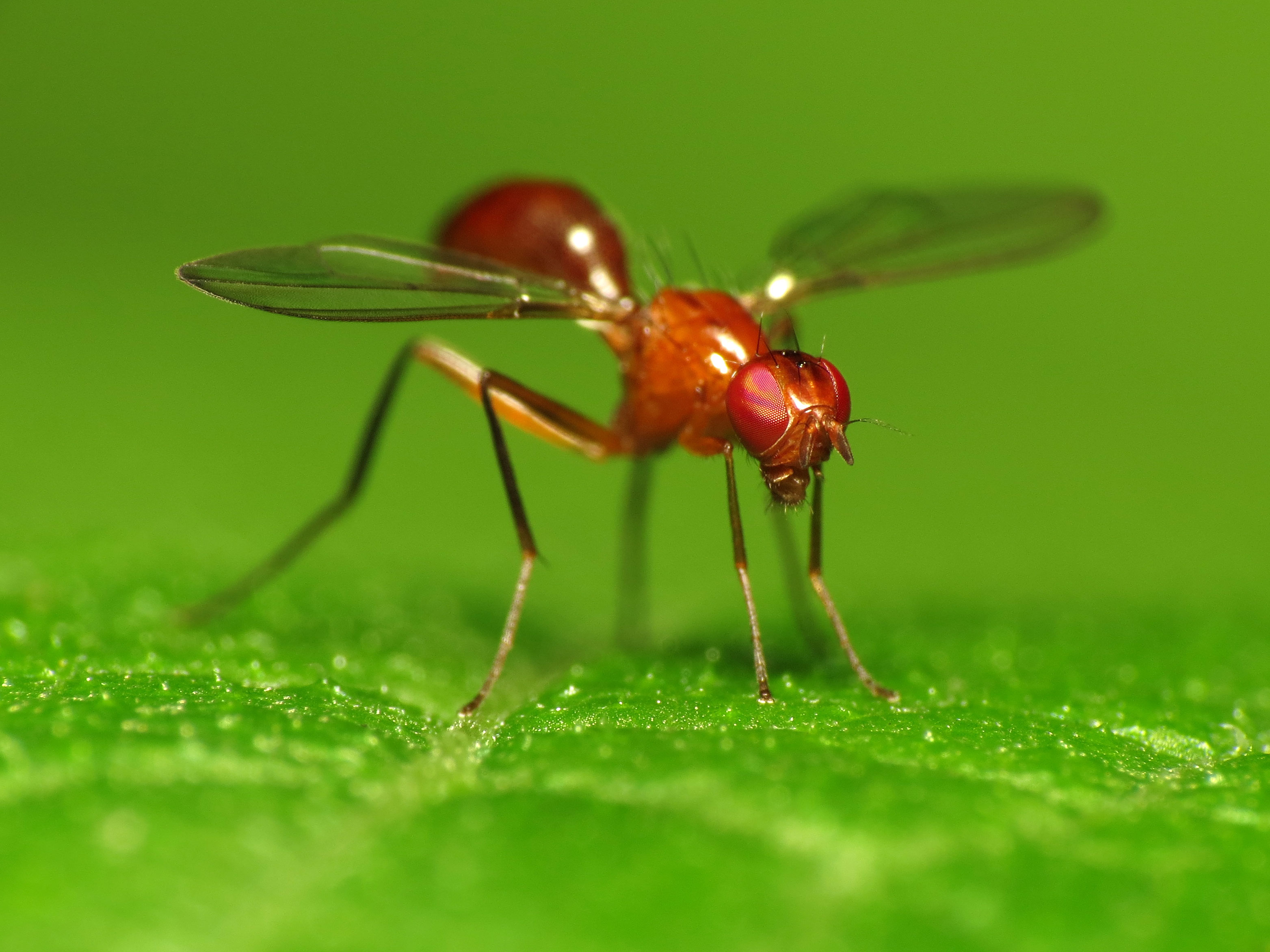

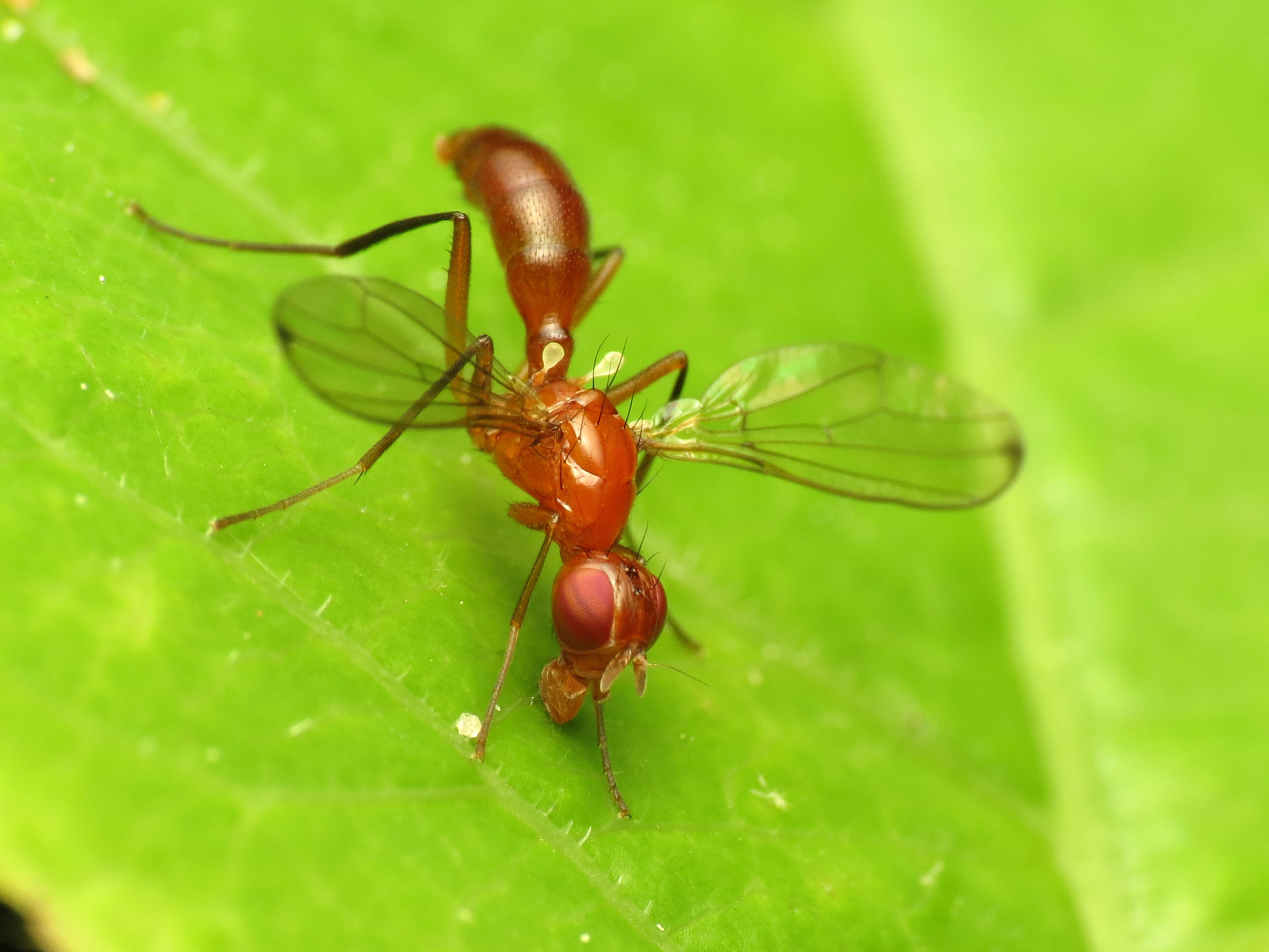
