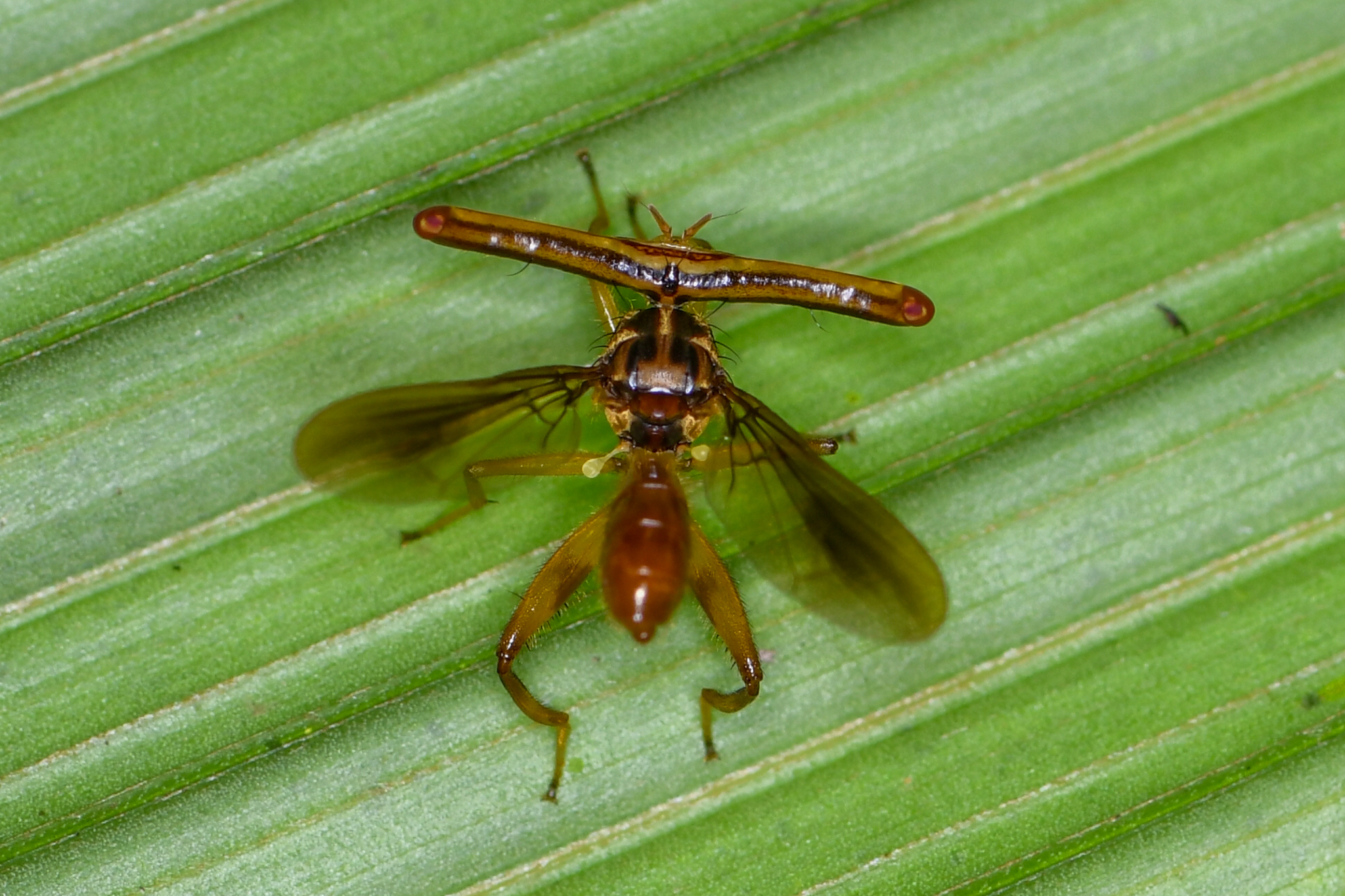

Scientific classification
- Domain: Eukaryota
- Kingdom: Animalia
- Phylum: Arthropoda
- Class: Insecta
- Order: Diptera
- Family: Richardiidae
- Genus: Richardia
- Species: R. telescopica

Binomial name
- Richardia telescopica Gerstaecker, 1860

= Richardia telescopica =

Species of insect

Richardia telescopica is a species of flies from the genus Richardia. The species was originally described by Gerstaecker in 1860 and it occurs in Nicaragua, Costa Rica, and Panama.

== Description ==
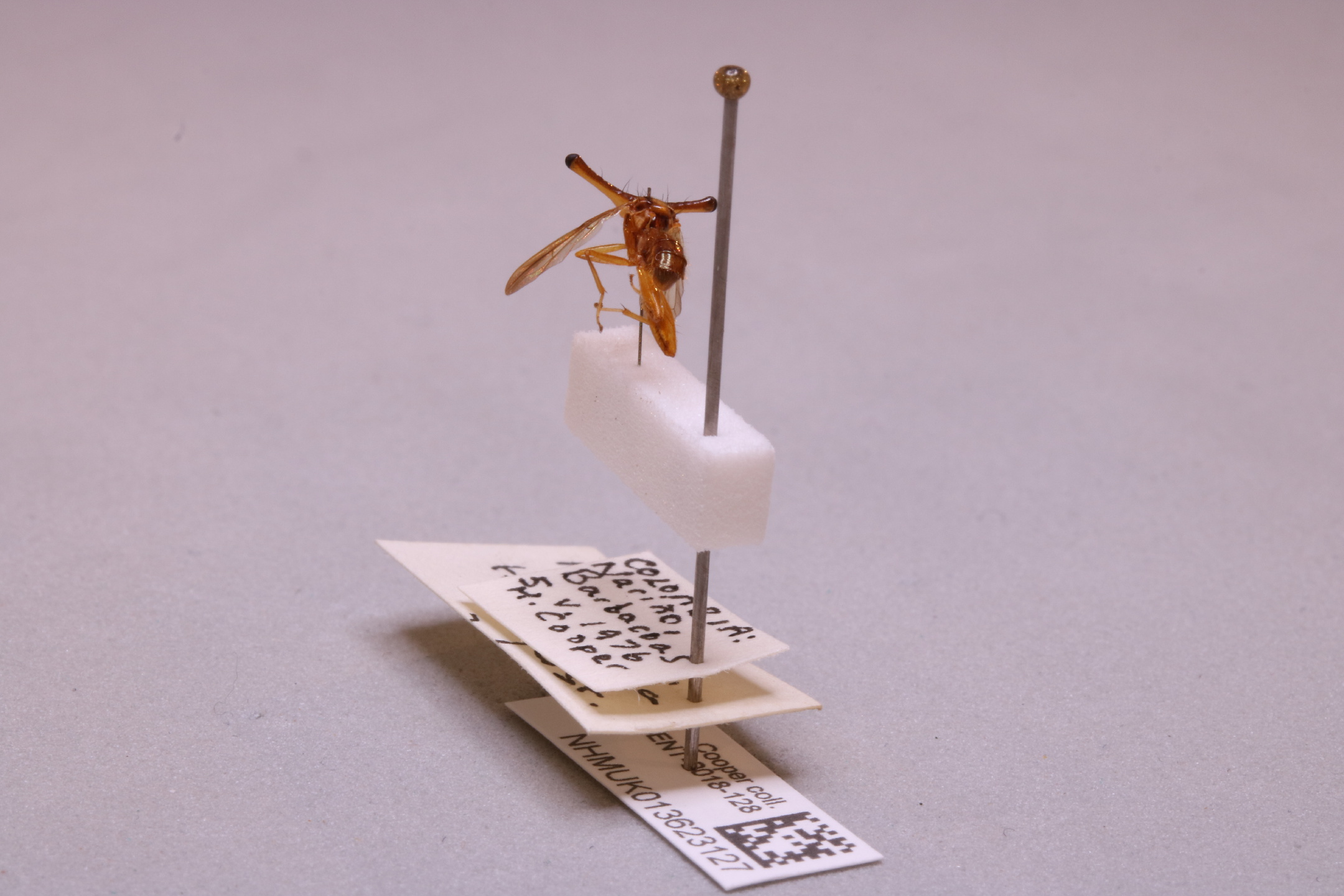
R. telescopica specimen from NHML.

R. telescopica presents an extreme form of sexual dimorphism. Males of Richardia telescopica display characteristic "eyestalks", a form of hypercephaly—an exaggerated lateral extension of the eyes away from the head—whereas females show limited hypercephaly. Hypercephaly evolved in several insect orders, including Hymenoptera, Heteroptera, and Diptera and has arisen at least 21 times among flies. Other species in genus Richardia with hypercephaly as a dimorphic trait include Richardia stylops and Richardia chocoensis.

Eyestalks of R. telescopica extend obliquely from the base of the head, unlike in congeners like Richardia chocoensis (with horizontal eyestalks). Interocular distance in males of Richardia telescopica doesn't exceed the body length whereas in other species of eyestalk flies (such as Plagiocephalus latifrons from Ecuador) it can extend to more than twice the length of the body.
