= Odontomera ferruginea =

Scientific classification
- Kingdom: Animalia
- Phylum: Arthropoda
- Class: Insecta
- Order: Diptera
- Family: Richardiidae
- Genus: Odontomera
- Species: O. ferruginea

Binomial name
- Odontomera ferruginea Macquart, 1843

Synonyms
- Odontomera dorotheae Brimley, 1925

Species of fly

Odontomera ferruginea is a species of fly in the family Richardiidae.
