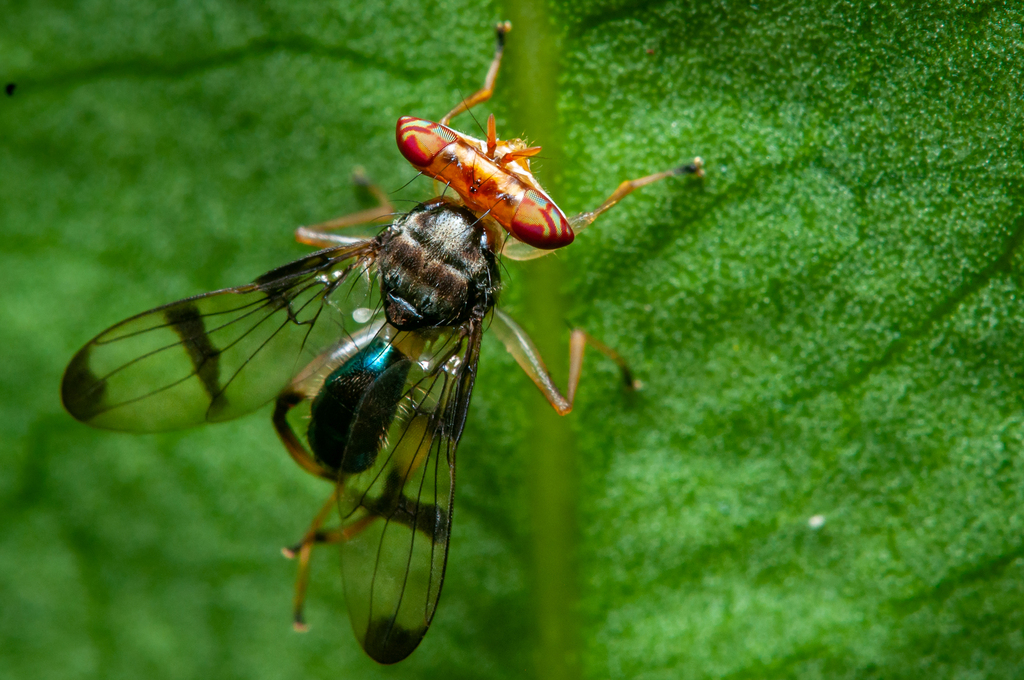

Scientific classification
- Kingdom: Animalia
- Phylum: Arthropoda
- Clade: Pancrustacea
- Class: Insecta
- Order: Diptera
- Family: Richardiidae
- Genus: Richardia
- Species: R. advena

Binomial name
- Richardia advena

= Richardia advena =

Species of fly

Richardia advena is a species of fly in the family Richardiidae. It occurs in Central and South America.
