= Setellia femoralis =

Scientific classification
- Kingdom: Animalia
- Phylum: Arthropoda
- Class: Insecta
- Order: Diptera
- Family: Richardiidae
- Genus: Setellia
- Species: S. femoralis

Binomial name
- Setellia femoralis (Wiedemann, 1830)

Synonyms
- Cephalia femoralis Wiedemann, 1830

Species of fly

Setellia femoralis is a species of fly in the genus Setellia of the family Richardiidae.
