= Odontomera limbata =

Scientific classification
- Domain: Eukaryota
- Kingdom: Animalia
- Phylum: Arthropoda
- Class: Insecta
- Order: Diptera
- Family: Richardiidae
- Genus: Odontomera
- Species: O. limbata

Binomial name
- Odontomera limbata Steyskal, 1958

Species of fly

Odontomera limbata is a species of fly in the family Richardiidae.
