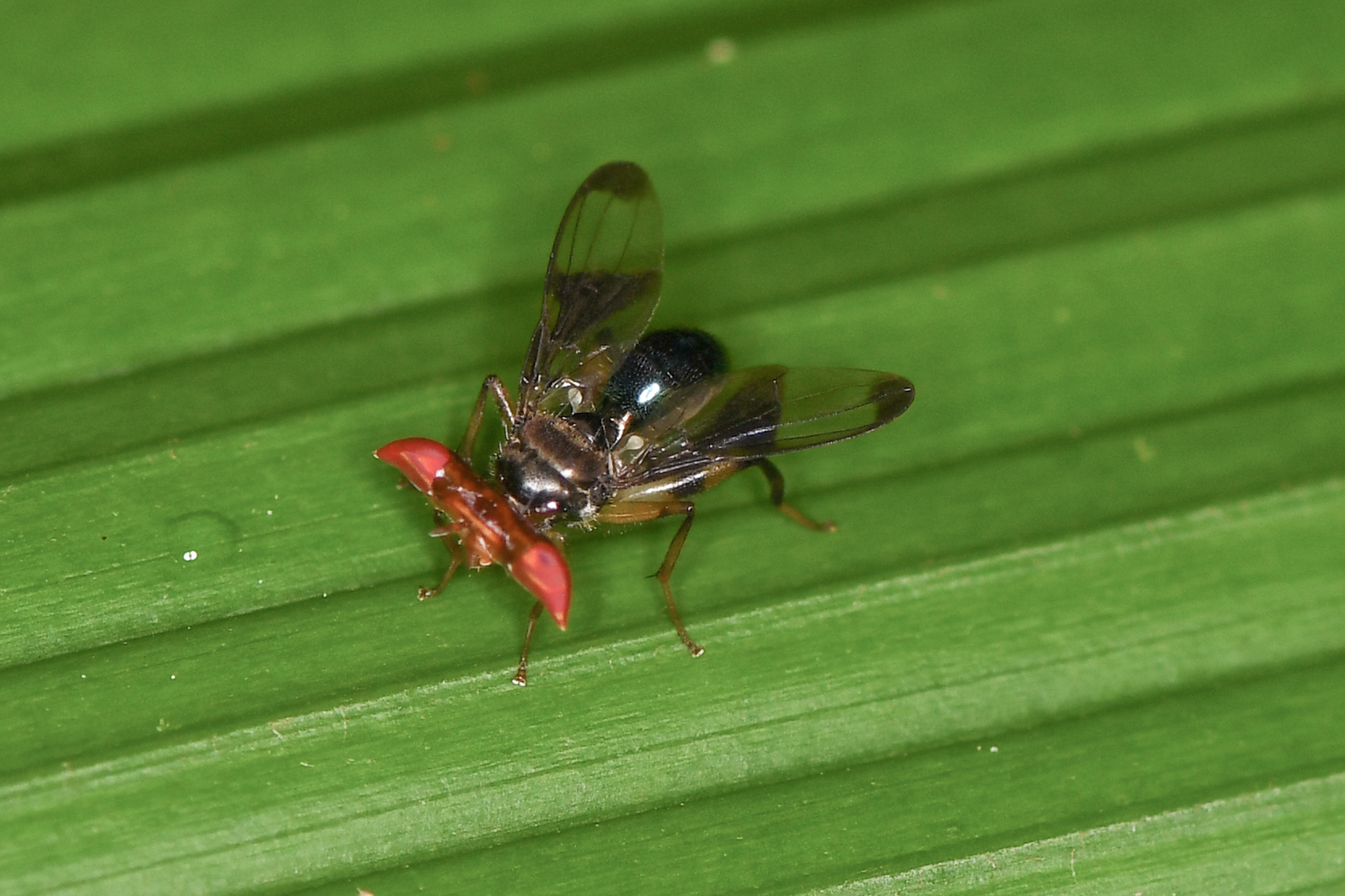
- Richardia advena

Scientific classification
- Domain: Eukaryota
- Kingdom: Animalia
- Phylum: Arthropoda
- Class: Insecta
- Order: Diptera
- Family: Richardiidae
- Genus: Richardia; Robineau-Desvoid, 1830

= Richardia (fly) =

Genus of flies

Richardia is a genus of flies in the family Richardiidae. It was first described by French entomologist Jean-Baptiste Robineau-Desvoid in 1830. It occurs from Mexico to Central and South America.

== Description ==
The genus includes species with strongly enlarged heads (hypercephalism) and "eyestalks" (eyes inserted in the lateral projection of the head) such as the males R. telescopica and R. stylops. Stalk-eyed flies in family Diopsidae have their antennae located on the stalk, rather than in the middle of the head as in Richardiidae.

== Taxonomy ==
The Richardia genus comprises the following species:

- Richardia advena
- Richardia analis Hendel, 1911
- Richardia annulata (Macquart, 1835
- Richardia calcarata Hendel, 1912
- Richardia centraliamericana Hennig, 1937
- Richardia concinna Wulp, 1899
- Richardia eburneosignata Hennig, 1937
- Richardia elegans Wulp, 1899
- Richardia flavipes Schiner, 1868
- Richardia hendeliana Enderlein, 1913
- Richardia infestans Enderlein, 1912
- Richardia laeta Walker, 1853
- Richardia laterina Rondani, 1848
- Richardia latibrachium Enderlein, 1912
- Richardia lichtwardti Hendel, 1911
- Richardia numerifera Speiser, 1911
- Richardia pectinata Hendel, 1912
- Richardia podagrica Fabricius, 1805
- Richardia proxima Schiner, 1868
- Richardia saltatoria Robineau-Desvoidy, 1830
- Richardia schnusei Hendel, 1911
- Richardia stylops Hennig, 1938
- Richardia teevani Curran, 1934
- Richardia telescopica Gerstaecker, 1860
- Richardia tephritina Enderlein, 191
- Richardia tuberculata Hendel, 1911
- Richardia undulata Hennig, 1937
- Richardia unifasciata Rondani, 1848
- Richardia unimaculata Hendel, 1911
- Richardia viridiventris Wulp, 1899
