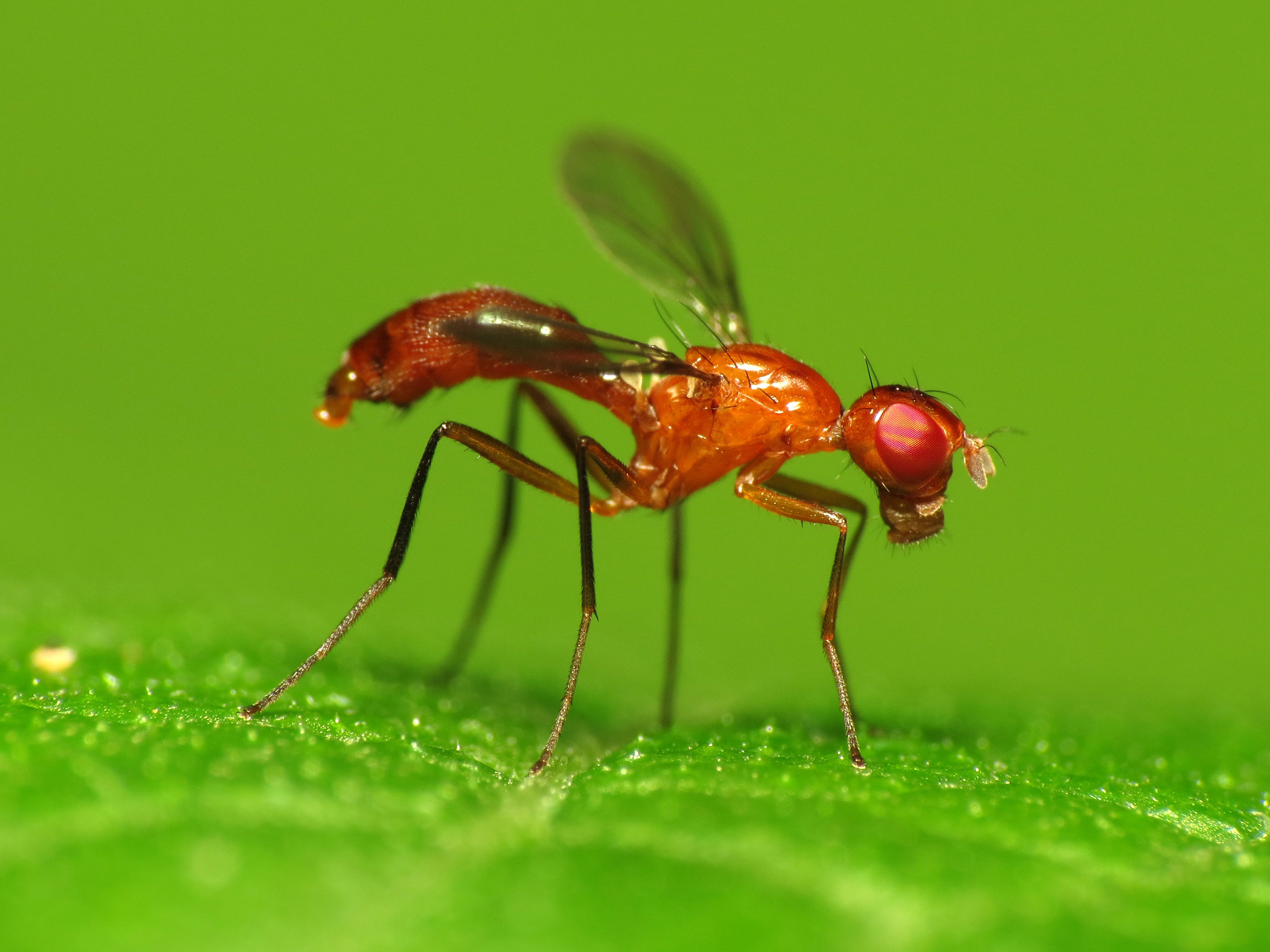
- Sepsisoma flavescens

Scientific classification
- Domain: Eukaryota
- Kingdom: Animalia
- Phylum: Arthropoda
- Class: Insecta
- Order: Diptera
- Family: Richardiidae
- Genus: Sepsisoma; Johnson, 1900

= Sepsisoma =

Genus of flies

Sepsisoma is a genus of flies in the family Richardiidae. There are about 13 described species in Sepsisoma.

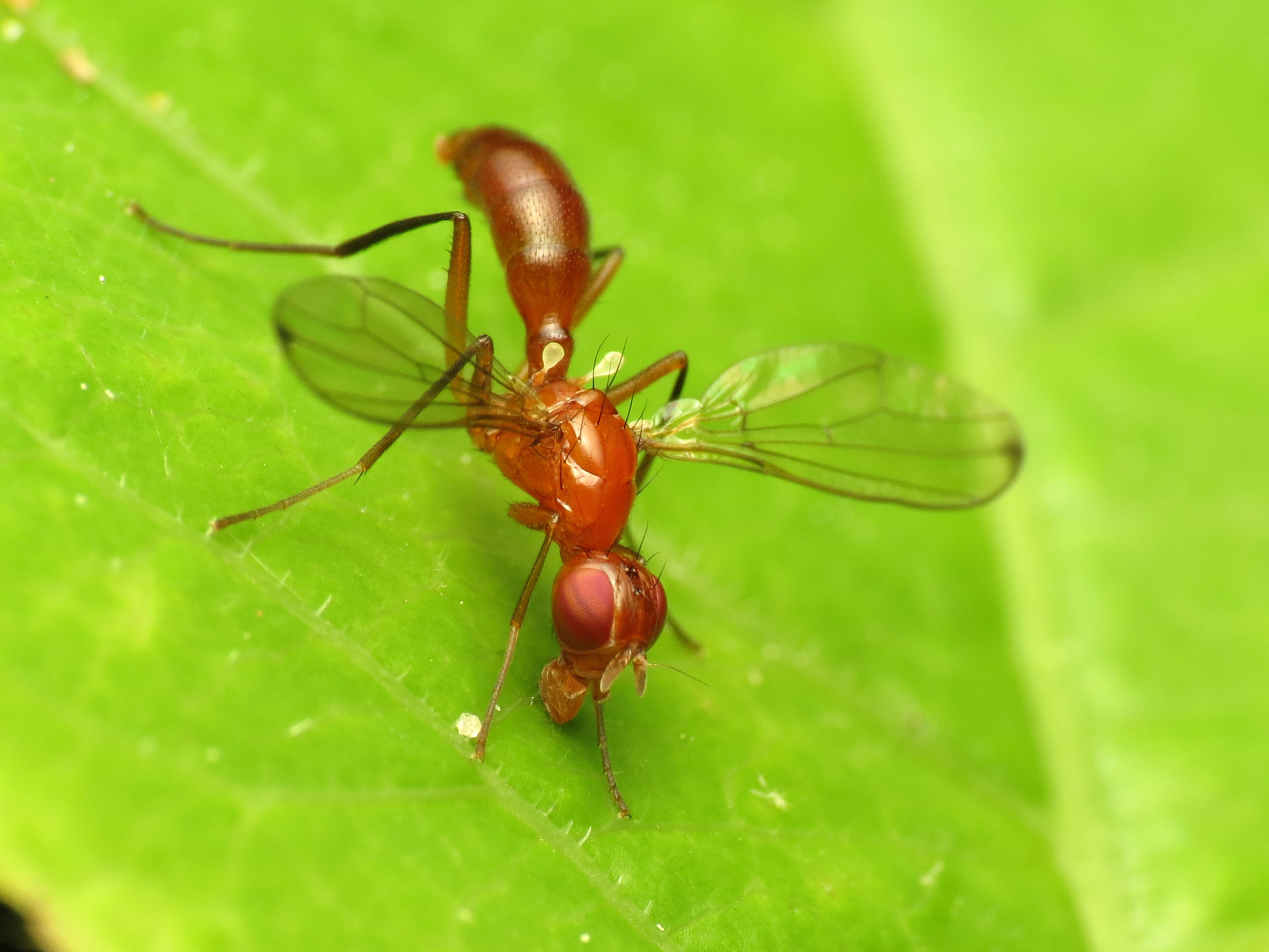
Sepsisoma flavescens

== Species ==
These 13 species belong to the genus Sepsisoma:

- Sepsisoma anale (Schiner, 1868)
- Sepsisoma atra (Walker, 1853)
- Sepsisoma erythrocephalum (Schiner, 1868)
- Sepsisoma flavescens Johnson, 1900
- Sepsisoma geniculatum (Schiner, 1868)
- Sepsisoma goldschmidti Lindner, 1930
- Sepsisoma minimum Steyskal, 1961
- Sepsisoma nigronitens Hendel, 1911
- Sepsisoma opacum Hendel, 1911
- Sepsisoma reductum Lindner, 1930
- Sepsisoma sabroskyi Steyskal, 1961
- Sepsisoma sepsioides (Schiner, 1868)
- Sepsisoma umbripenne Hendel, 1911
