= Coniceps =

Scientific classification
- Domain: Eukaryota
- Kingdom: Animalia
- Phylum: Arthropoda
- Class: Insecta
- Order: Diptera
- Family: Richardiidae
- Genus: Coniceps; Loew, 1873

Genus of flies

Coniceps is a genus of flies in the family Richardiidae. There is one described species in Coniceps, C. niger.
