= Setellia =

Scientific classification
- Domain: Eukaryota
- Kingdom: Animalia
- Phylum: Arthropoda
- Class: Insecta
- Order: Diptera
- Family: Richardiidae
- Genus: Setellia; Robineau-Desvoidy (1830)

Genus of flies

Setellia is a genus of flies in the family Richardiidae found mostly in Central America. During mating the males perform a ritual display on the upper surface of a leaf.

== Species ==
- Setellia afra Robineau-Desvoidy, 1830
- Setellia apex Hendel, 1911
- Setellia costalis Schiner, 1868
- Setellia dichaeta Hennig, 1937
- Setellia diffusa Gerstaecker, 1860
- Setellia distincta Walker, 1853
- Setellia fascipennis Wiedemann, 1830
- Setellia femoralis Wiedemann, 1830
- Setellia fusca Macquart, 1844
- Setellia marginata Wiedemann, 1830
- Setellia micans Hendel, 1911
- Setellia nigra Schiner, 1868
- Setellia nigripes Lopes, 1936
- Setellia nitidipennis Wulp, 1899
- Setellia pernix Gerstaecker, 1860
- Setellia peruana Hennig, 1937
- Setellia poeciloptera Hendel, 1911
- Setellia punctigera Enderlein, 1913
- Setellia unispinosa Bigot, 1886
- Setellia wiedemanni Hendel, 1911

Data source:GBIF
