= Odontomera =

Scientific classification
- Domain: Eukaryota
- Kingdom: Animalia
- Phylum: Arthropoda
- Class: Insecta
- Order: Diptera
- Family: Richardiidae
- Genus: Odontomera; Macquart, 1843

Genus of flies

Odontomera is a genus of flies in the family Richardiidae. There are about 19 described species in Odontomera.

== Species ==
These 19 species belong to the genus Odontomera:

- O. albopilosa Hendel, 1911^{c g}
- O. apicalis Hendel, 1911^{c g}
- O. basistriga (Walker, 1861)^{c g}
- O. canonigra Enderlein, 1912^{c g}
- O. cincta Hennig, 1938^{c g}
- O. coniceps Hendel, 1911^{c g}
- O. costalis Hendel, 1911^{c g}
- O. ferruginea Macquart, 1843^{i c g b}
- O. flavipennis Enderlein, 1912^{c g}
- O. flavipleura Hennig, 1938^{c g}
- O. limbata Steyskal, 1958^{i c g b}
- O. liturata Robineau-Desvoidy, 1830^{c g}
- O. marginalis (Walker, 1861)^{c g}
- O. nigropilosa Hendel, 1911^{c g}
- O. nitens (Schiner, 1868)^{c g}
- O. ruficauda Hendel, 1936^{c g}
- O. strigata Hennig, 1938^{c g}
- O. terminalis (Walker, 1853)^{c g}
- O. venosa Hendel, 1911^{c g}

Data sources: i = ITIS, c = Catalogue of Life, g = GBIF, b = Bugguide.net
