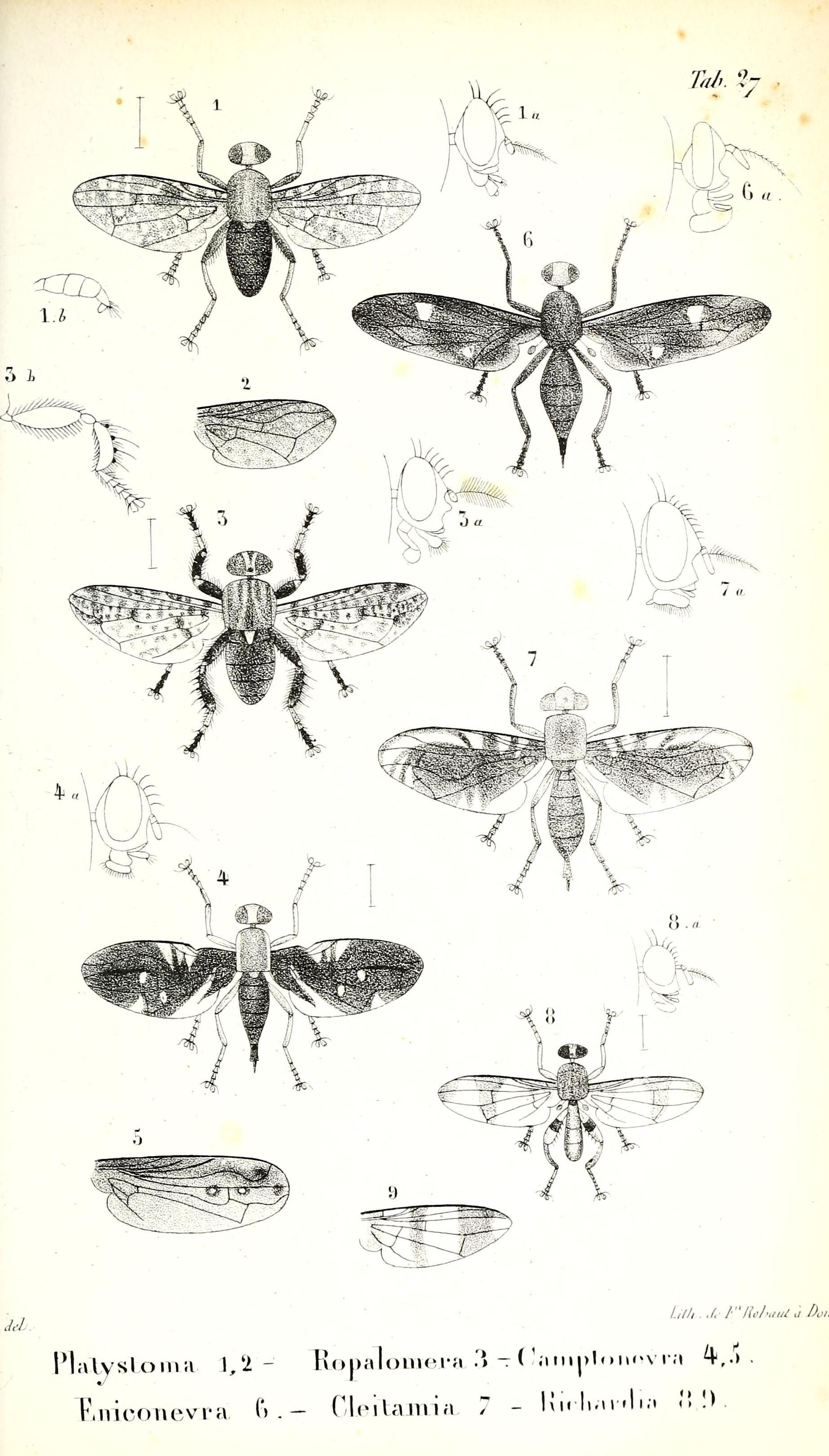
- figures 8, 9

Scientific classification
- Kingdom: Animalia
- Phylum: Arthropoda
- Clade: Pancrustacea
- Class: Insecta
- Order: Diptera
- Section: Schizophora
- Subsection: Acalyptratae
- Superfamily: Tephritoidea
- Family: Richardiidae; Loew, 1868

Type genus
- Richardia Robineau-Desvoidy, 1830

Subfamilies
- Epiplateinae; Richardiinae

Synonyms
- Richardiidae Hendel, 1916

= Richardiidae =

Family of flies

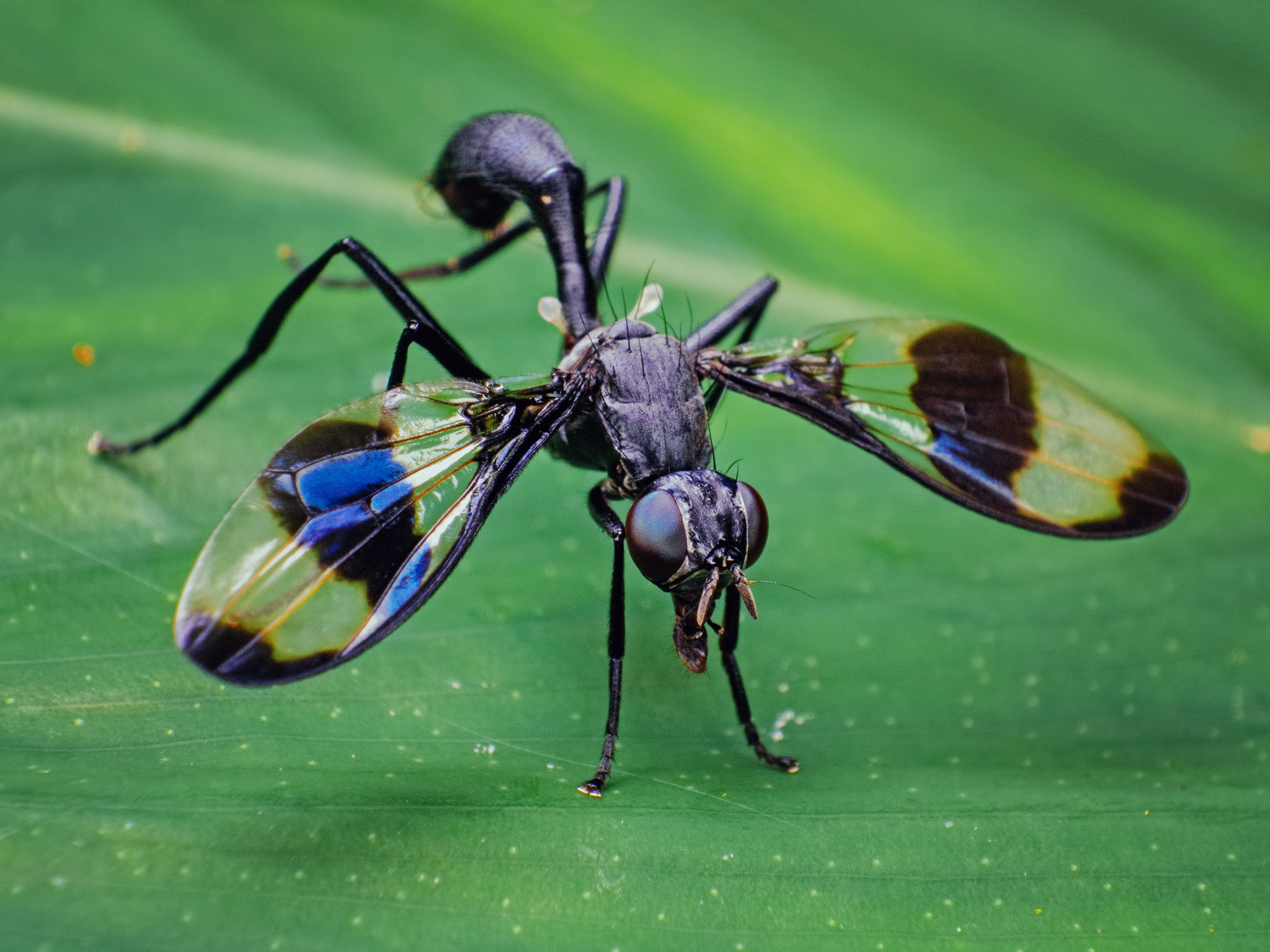
Richardiidae from Brazil, likely Setellia sp.

The Richardiidae are a family of Diptera in the superfamily Tephritoidea.

This small family consists of just over 30 genera and 175 species. Almost all species are neotropical. Generally, the biology of the richardiids is little known. Some of the larvae are plant feeders or saprophages in decaying plant material. One species, the pineapple fruit fly Melanoloma viatrix, has been reported as a pest of pineapples. Most adults have some general features, conspicuously pictured wings, often with metallic blue or greenish colors on the body and legs, and a typical tephritoid ovipositor.

== Genera ==
- Acompha Hendel, 1911
- Antineuromyia Hendel, 1914
- Automola Loew, 1873
- Batrachophthalmum Hendel, 1911
- Beebeomyia Curran, 1934
- Cladiscophleps Enderlein, 1912
- Coilometopia Macquart, 1847
- Coniceps Loew, 1873
- Epiplatea Loew, 1868
- Euolena Loew, 1873
- Hemixantha Loew, 1873
- Johnrichardia Perez-Gelabert & Thompson, 2006
- Macrostenomyia Hendel, 1907
- Maerorichardia Hennig, 1937
- Megalothoraca Hendel, 1911
- Melanoloma Loew, 1873
- Neoidiotypa Osten Sacken, 1878
- Ocaenicia Enderlein, 1927
- Odontomera Macquart, 1843
- Odontomerella Hendel, 1912
- Oedematella Hendel, 1911
- Omomyia Coquillett, 1907
- Ozaenina Enderlein, 1912
- Pachysomites Cockerell, 1916
- Paneryma Wulp, 1899
- Poecilomyia Hendel, 1911
- Richardia Robineau-Desvoidy, 1830
- Richardiodes Hendel, 1912
- Sepsisoma Johnson, 1900
- Setellia Robineau-Desvoidy, 1830
- Setellida Hendel, 1911
- Spheneuolena Hendel, 1911
- Stenomyites Cockerell, 1915
- Urortalis Cockerell, 1917
