= Scamaphis equestris =

Scientific classification
- Domain: Eukaryota
- Kingdom: Animalia
- Phylum: Arthropoda
- Subphylum: Chelicerata
- Class: Arachnida
- Order: Mesostigmata
- Family: Eviphididae
- Genus: Scamaphis
- Species: S. equestris

Binomial name
- Scamaphis equestris (Berlese, 1911)

Species of mite

Scamaphis equestris is a species of mite in the family Eviphididae.
