= Scarabaspis inexpectatus =

Scientific classification
- Kingdom: Animalia
- Phylum: Arthropoda
- Subphylum: Chelicerata
- Class: Arachnida
- Order: Mesostigmata
- Family: Eviphididae
- Genus: Scarabaspis
- Species: S. inexpectatus

Binomial name
- Scarabaspis inexpectatus (Oudemans, 1903)

Species of mite

Scarabaspis inexpectatus is a species of mite in the family Eviphididae.
