= Scarabacariphis =

Scientific classification
- Domain: Eukaryota
- Kingdom: Animalia
- Phylum: Arthropoda
- Subphylum: Chelicerata
- Class: Arachnida
- Order: Mesostigmata
- Family: Eviphididae
- Genus: Scarabacariphis; Masan, 1994

Genus of mites

Scarabacariphis is a genus of mites in the family Eviphididae.
