= Crassicheles concentricus =

Scientific classification
- Kingdom: Animalia
- Phylum: Arthropoda
- Subphylum: Chelicerata
- Class: Arachnida
- Order: Mesostigmata
- Family: Eviphididae
- Genus: Crassicheles
- Species: C. concentricus

Binomial name
- Crassicheles concentricus (Oudemans, 1904)

Species of mite

Crassicheles concentricus is a species of mite in the family Eviphididae. It is found in Europe.
