= Eviphis =

Scientific classification
- Domain: Eukaryota
- Kingdom: Animalia
- Phylum: Arthropoda
- Subphylum: Chelicerata
- Class: Arachnida
- Order: Mesostigmata
- Family: Eviphididae
- Genus: Eviphis; Berlese, 1903

Genus of mites

Eviphis is a genus of mites in the family Eviphididae. There are about five described species in Eviphis.

== Species ==
These five species belong to the genus Eviphis:

- Eviphis drepanogaster Berlese, 1882
- Eviphis hirtellus (Berlese, 1882)
- Eviphis ostrinus (C.L.Koch, 1836)
- Eviphis pyrobolus (C.L.Koch, 1839)
- Eviphis siculus A.Berlese, 1903
