= Eviphididae =

Scientific classification
- Kingdom: Animalia
- Phylum: Arthropoda
- Subphylum: Chelicerata
- Class: Arachnida
- Order: Mesostigmata
- Suborder: Monogynaspida
- Infraorder: Gamasina
- Superfamily: Eviphidoidea
- Family: Eviphididae; Berlese, 1913

Family of mites

Eviphididae is a family of mites in the order Mesostigmata.

== Species ==
Alliphis Halbert, 1923

- Alliphis ankavani Arutunian, 1992
- Alliphis bakeri Arutunian, 1992
- Alliphis brevisternalis Ma-Liming & Wang-Shenron, 1998
- Alliphis hirschmanni Arutunian, 1991
- Alliphis huangzhongensis Li, 2001
- Alliphis kargi Arutunian, 1991
- Alliphis longicornis Gu & Liu, 1996
- Alliphis longirivulus Gu & Liu, 1996
- Alliphis magnus Gu & Fan, 1997
- Alliphis necrophilus Christie, 1983
- Alliphis phoreticus Masan, 1994
- Alliphis pratensis (Karg, 1965)
- Alliphis rosickyi Samsinak & Daniel, 1978
- Alliphis rotundianalis Masan, 1994
- Alliphis serrochaetae Ramaraju & Mohanasundaram, 1996
- Alliphis siculus (Oudemans, 1905)
- Alliphis sinicus Gu & Bai, in Gu, Bai & Huang Gu 1989
- Alliphis stenosternus Gu & Liu, 1996
- Alliphis trichiensis Ramaraju & Mohanasundaram, 1996
- Alliphis yinchuanensis Gu & Bai, 1997
- Alliphis yuxiensis Gu & Fan, 1997

Copriphis Berlese, 1910

- Copriphis crinitus (Berlese, 1882)
- Copriphis cultratellus
- Copriphis falcinellus (R. Canestrini & G. Canestrini, 1882)
- Copriphis pterophilus (Berlese, 1882)

Crassicheles Karg, 1963

- Crassicheles concentricus (Oudemans, 1904)

Cryptoseius Makarova, 1998

- Cryptoseius petrovae Makarova, 1998

Evimirus Karg, 1963

- Evimirus leptogenitalis Karg, 1979
- Evimirus pentagonius Karg, 1996
- Evimirus pulcherpori Karg, 1989
- Evimirus uropodinus (Berlese, 1903)

Eviphis Berlese, 1903

- Eviphis acutus Tao & Gu, 1996
- Eviphis barunensis Samsinak & Daniel, 1978
- Eviphis chanti Arutunian, 1992
- Eviphis cryptognathus Gu & Bai, 1990
- Eviphis cultratellus (Berlese, 1910)
- Eviphis dalianensis Sun, Yin & Zhang, 1992
- Eviphis emeiensis Zhou, Wang & Ji, 1990
- Eviphis himalayaensis Ma & Piao, 1981
- Eviphis hirtellus (Berlese, 1892)
- Eviphis huainanensis Wen, 1965
- Eviphis nanchongensis Zhou, Chen & Wei, 1990
- Eviphis oeconomus Yang & Gu, 1991
- Eviphis ostrinus (C.L. Koch, 1835)
- Eviphis parindicus Bhattacharyya, 1993
- Eviphis pyrobolus (C.L.Koch, 1839)
- Eviphis qinghaiensis Chen & Li, 1998
- Eviphis ramosae Ramaraju & Mohanasundaram, 1996
- Eviphis ruoergaiensis Zhou, Chen & Wei, 1990
- Eviphis shaanxiensis Gu & Huang, in Gu, Bai & Huang 1989
- Eviphis sikkimensis Bhattacharyya, 1993
- Eviphis spatulaesetae Ramaraju & Mohanasundaram, 1996
- Eviphis tongdensis Li, Yang & Wang, 2000
- Eviphis tsherepanovi Davydova, 1979
- Eviphis wanglangensis Zhou, Chen & Wei, 1990
- Eviphis zolotarenkoi Davydova, 1979

Pelethiphis Berlese, 1911

- Pelethiphis balachovi Arutunian, 1992
- Pelethiphis insignis Berlese, 1911
- Pelethiphis opacus Koyumdjieva, 1981

Rafaphis Skorupski & Blaszak, 1997

- Rafaphis microsternalis Skorupski & Blaszak, 1997

Scamaphis Karg, 1976

- Scamaphis equestris (Berlese, 1911)
- Scamaphis exanimis Karg, 1976
- Scamaphis guyimingi Ma-Liming, 1997

Scarabacariphis P. Masan, 1994

- Scarabacariphis grandisternalis P. Masan, 1994

Scarabaspis Womersley, 1956

- Scarabaspis altaicus Skljar, in Sklyar 1999
- Scarabaspis aspera Womersley, 1956
- Scarabaspis concavus Gu & Fan, 1997
- Scarabaspis goulouensis Liu, Cu & Ma, 1992
- Scarabaspis inexpectatus (Oudemans, 1903)

Thinoseius Halbert, 1920

- Thinoseius berlesei Halbert, 1920
- Thinoseius occidentalipacificus Klimov, 1998
- Thinoseius orchestoideae (Hall, 1912)
- Thinoseuis ramsayi Evans, 1969
- Thinoseius sawadai Takaku, 2000
- Thinoseius setifer Takaku, 2000

== Hosts ==
The Thinoseius genera is known to parasitize the specific species of insects, C. frigida and their overarching genera Coelopa. There is still research being done on the parasitic behavior demonstrated from other genera of the Eviphididae.
