= Evimirus =

Scientific classification
- Kingdom: Animalia
- Phylum: Arthropoda
- Subphylum: Chelicerata
- Class: Arachnida
- Order: Mesostigmata
- Family: Eviphididae
- Genus: Evimirus; Karg, 1963

Genus of mites

Evimirus is a genus of mites in the family Eviphididae. There are about three described species in Evimirus.

== Species ==
These five species belong to the genus Evimirus:

- Evimirus breviscuti Karg & Schorlemmer, 2009
- Evimirus pentagonius Karg, 1996
- Evimirus uropodinus (Berlese, 1903)
