= Thinoseius berlesei =

Scientific classification
- Domain: Eukaryota
- Kingdom: Animalia
- Phylum: Arthropoda
- Subphylum: Chelicerata
- Class: Arachnida
- Order: Mesostigmata
- Family: Eviphididae
- Genus: Thinoseius
- Species: T. berlesei

Binomial name
- Thinoseius berlesei Halbert, 1920

Species of mite

Thinoseius berlesei is a species of mite in the family Eviphididae.
