= Eviphis pyrobolus =

Scientific classification
- Domain: Eukaryota
- Kingdom: Animalia
- Phylum: Arthropoda
- Subphylum: Chelicerata
- Class: Arachnida
- Order: Mesostigmata
- Family: Eviphididae
- Genus: Eviphis
- Species: E. pyrobolus

Binomial name
- Eviphis pyrobolus (C.L.Koch, 1839)

Species of mite

Eviphis pyrobolus is a species of mite in the family Eviphididae.
