= Alliphis =

Scientific classification
- Domain: Eukaryota
- Kingdom: Animalia
- Phylum: Arthropoda
- Subphylum: Chelicerata
- Class: Arachnida
- Order: Mesostigmata
- Family: Eviphididae
- Genus: Alliphis; Halbert, 1923

Genus of mites

Alliphis is a genus of mites in the family Eviphididae. There are about five described species in Alliphis.

== Species ==
These five species belong to the genus Alliphis:

- Alliphis carinatus
- Alliphis chirophorus Willmann, 1956
- Alliphis halleri (G. & R.Canestrini, 1881)
- Alliphis sculpturatus Karg, 1963
- Alliphis siculus (Oudemans, 1905)
