= Thinoseius =

Scientific classification
- Domain: Eukaryota
- Kingdom: Animalia
- Phylum: Arthropoda
- Subphylum: Chelicerata
- Class: Arachnida
- Order: Mesostigmata
- Family: Eviphididae
- Genus: Thinoseius; Halbert, 1920

Genus of mites

Thinoseius is a genus of mites in the family Eviphididae. There are about nine described species in Thinoseius.

== Species ==
These nine species belong to the genus Thinoseius:

- Thinoseius acuminatus Evans, 1962
- Thinoseius berlesei Halbert, 1920
- Thinoseius fucicola (Halbert, 1920)
- Thinoseius hirschmanni
- Thinoseius kargi Hirschmann, 1966
- Thinoseius ramsayi Evans, 1969
- Thinoseius sawadai Takaku, 2000
- Thinoseius setifer Takaku, 2000
- Thinoseius spinosus (Willmann, 1939)
