= Pelethiphis =

Scientific classification
- Domain: Eukaryota
- Kingdom: Animalia
- Phylum: Arthropoda
- Subphylum: Chelicerata
- Class: Arachnida
- Order: Mesostigmata
- Family: Eviphididae
- Genus: Pelethiphis; Berlese, 1911

Genus of mites

Pelethiphis is a genus of mites in the family Eviphididae.
