= Copriphis crinitus =

Scientific classification
- Domain: Eukaryota
- Kingdom: Animalia
- Phylum: Arthropoda
- Subphylum: Chelicerata
- Class: Arachnida
- Order: Mesostigmata
- Family: Eviphididae
- Genus: Copriphis
- Species: C. crinitus

Binomial name
- Copriphis crinitus (Berlese, 1882)

Species of mite

Copriphis crinitus is a species of mite in the family Eviphididae.
