= Cryptoseius =

Scientific classification
- Kingdom: Animalia
- Phylum: Arthropoda
- Subphylum: Chelicerata
- Class: Arachnida
- Order: Mesostigmata
- Family: Eviphididae
- Genus: Cryptoseius; Makarova, 1998

Genus of mites

Cryptoseius is a genus of mites in the family Eviphididae. There are at least two described species in Cryptoseius, C. khayyami and C. petrovae.
