= Evimirus pentagonius =

Scientific classification
- Domain: Eukaryota
- Kingdom: Animalia
- Phylum: Arthropoda
- Subphylum: Chelicerata
- Class: Arachnida
- Order: Mesostigmata
- Family: Eviphididae
- Genus: Evimirus
- Species: E. pentagonius

Binomial name
- Evimirus pentagonius Karg, 1996

Species of mite

Evimirus pentagonius is a species of mite in the family Eviphididae. It was first described in 1996 by Wolfgang Karg.
