= Copriphis =

Scientific classification
- Domain: Eukaryota
- Kingdom: Animalia
- Phylum: Arthropoda
- Subphylum: Chelicerata
- Class: Arachnida
- Order: Mesostigmata
- Family: Eviphididae
- Genus: Copriphis; Berlese, 1910

Genus of mites

Copriphis is a genus of mites in the family Eviphididae. There are at least three described species in Copriphis.

== Species ==
These three species belong to the genus Copriphis:

- Copriphis crinitus (Berlese, 1882)
- Copriphis falcinellus (R. & G.Canestrini, 1882)
- Copriphis pterophilus (Berlese, 1882)
