= Alliphis siculus =

Scientific classification
- Kingdom: Animalia
- Phylum: Arthropoda
- Subphylum: Chelicerata
- Class: Arachnida
- Order: Mesostigmata
- Family: Eviphididae
- Genus: Alliphis
- Species: A. siculus

Binomial name
- Alliphis siculus (Oudemans, 1905)

Species of mite

Alliphis siculus is a species of mite in the family Eviphididae. It is found in Europe and New Zealand.
