= Thinoseius setifer =

Scientific classification
- Domain: Eukaryota
- Kingdom: Animalia
- Phylum: Arthropoda
- Subphylum: Chelicerata
- Class: Arachnida
- Order: Mesostigmata
- Family: Eviphididae
- Genus: Thinoseius
- Species: T. setifer

Binomial name
- Thinoseius setifer Takaku, 2000

Species of mite

Thinoseius setifer is a species of mite in the family Eviphididae.
