= Evimirus uropodinus =

Scientific classification
- Domain: Eukaryota
- Kingdom: Animalia
- Phylum: Arthropoda
- Subphylum: Chelicerata
- Class: Arachnida
- Order: Mesostigmata
- Family: Eviphididae
- Genus: Evimirus
- Species: E. uropodinus

Binomial name
- Evimirus uropodinus (Berlese, 1903)

Species of mite

Evimirus uropodinus is a species of mite in the family Eviphididae.
