= Eviphis ostrinus =

Scientific classification
- Domain: Eukaryota
- Kingdom: Animalia
- Phylum: Arthropoda
- Subphylum: Chelicerata
- Class: Arachnida
- Order: Mesostigmata
- Family: Eviphididae
- Genus: Eviphis
- Species: E. ostrinus

Binomial name
- Eviphis ostrinus (C.L.Koch, 1836)

Species of mite

Eviphis ostrinus is a species of mite in the family Eviphididae. It is found in Europe.
