= Crassicheles =

Scientific classification
- Domain: Eukaryota
- Kingdom: Animalia
- Phylum: Arthropoda
- Subphylum: Chelicerata
- Class: Arachnida
- Order: Mesostigmata
- Family: Eviphididae
- Genus: Crassicheles; Karg, 1963

Genus of mites

Crassicheles is a genus of mites in the family Eviphididae. There are at least two described species in Crassicheles.

== Species ==
These two species belong to the genus Crassicheles:

- Crassicheles concentricus (Oudemans, 1904)
- Crassicheles holstaticus (Willmann, 1937)
