= Scamaphis =

Scientific classification
- Domain: Eukaryota
- Kingdom: Animalia
- Phylum: Arthropoda
- Subphylum: Chelicerata
- Class: Arachnida
- Order: Mesostigmata
- Family: Eviphididae
- Genus: Scamaphis; Karg, 1976
- Species: S. equestris

Binomial name
- Scamaphis equestris (Berlese, 1911)

Genus of mites

Scamaphis is a genus of mites in the family Eviphididae. There is at least one described species in Scamaphis, S. equestris.
