= Scarabaspis =

Scientific classification
- Kingdom: Animalia
- Phylum: Arthropoda
- Subphylum: Chelicerata
- Class: Arachnida
- Order: Mesostigmata
- Family: Eviphididae
- Genus: Scarabaspis; Womersley, 1956
- Species: S. inexpectatus

Binomial name
- Scarabaspis inexpectatus (Oudemans, 1903)

Genus of mites

Scarabaspis is a genus of mites in the family Eviphididae. There is at least one described species in Scarabaspis, S. inexpectatus.
