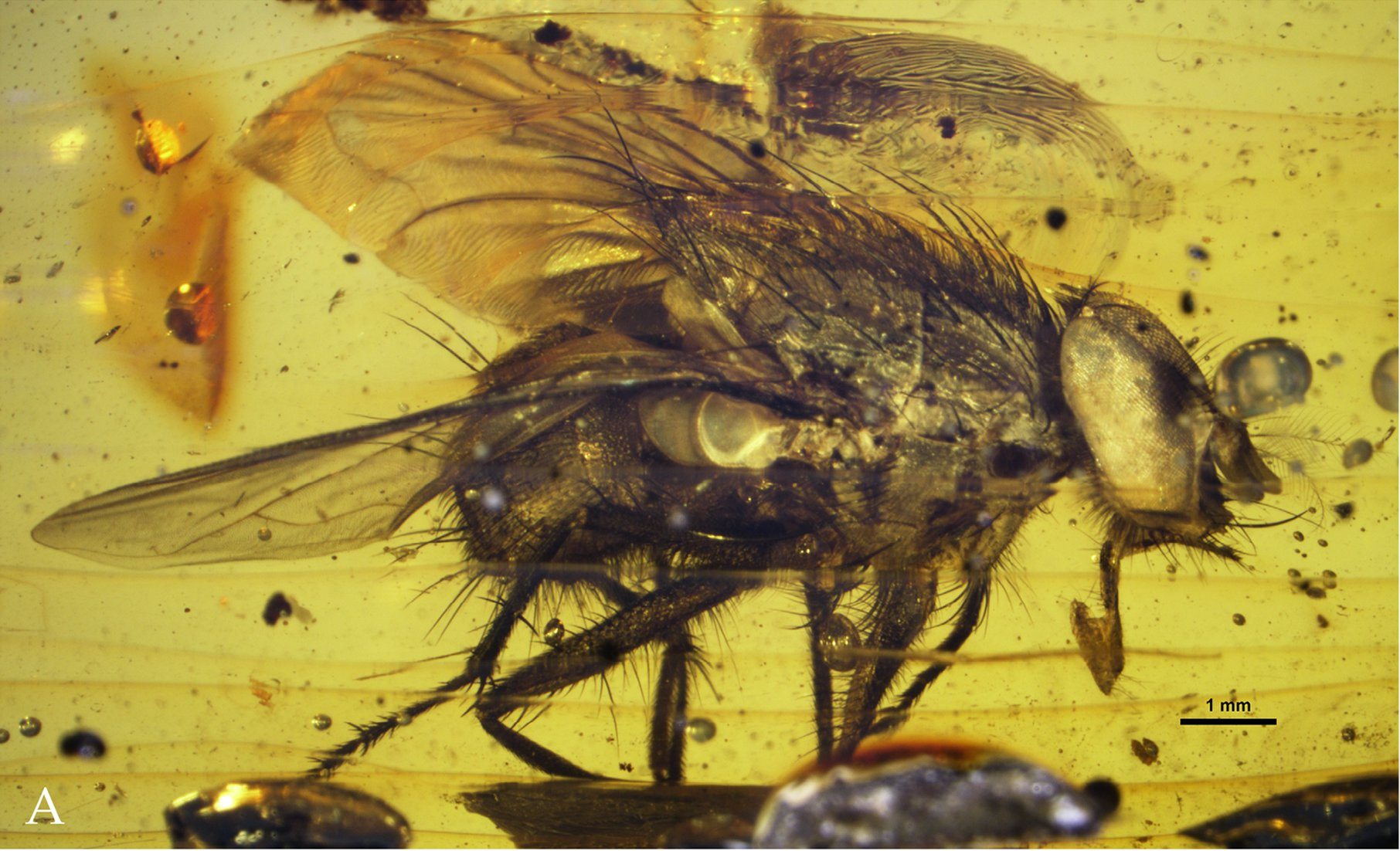
- Holotype male

Scientific classification
- Kingdom: Animalia
- Phylum: Arthropoda
- Clade: Pancrustacea
- Class: Insecta
- Order: Diptera
- Family: Mesembrinellidae
- Subfamily: Mesembrinellinae
- Genus: Mesembrinella
- Species: †M. caenozoica

Binomial name
- †Mesembrinella caenozoica Cerretti et al, 2017

= Mesembrinella caenozoica =

Mesembrinella caenozoica Temporal range: Burdigalian

Extinct species of fly

Mesembrinella caenozoica is an extinct species of blow fly in the family Mesembrinellidae. The species is solely known from the Middle Miocene Dominican amber deposits on the island of Hispaniola.

== History and classification ==
Mesembrinella caenozoica was described based on a single fossilised specimen which is preserved as an inclusion in a transparent chunk of Dominican amber. The amber was produced by the extinct Hymenaea protera, which formerly grew on the island of Hispaniola, across northern South America and up to southern Mexico. The amber dates from the Burdigalian stage (20.43 ± 0.05 to 15.97 ± 0.05 million years ago) of the Miocene, and is recovered from sections of the La Toca Formation in the Cordillera Septentrional and the Yanigua Formation in the Cordillera Oriental. The specimen was collected from an unidentified amber mine in the Dominican Republic.

At the time of description, the holotype specimen was preserved in the collections of the American Museum of Natural History in New York City. The fossil was first studied by an international team of researchers headed by entomologist Pierfilippo Cerretti of Sapienza University of Rome, Italy. The team's 2017 type description of the species was published in the natural sciences journal PLOS One. The specific epithet caenozoica was in reference to the Cenozoic Era, which is derived in turn from the Greek words kainos', which means "new", and zoe which means 'life'. The Cenozoic spans from approximately 66 million years ago to the present. Cerretti et al noted the species to be the first unambiguous fossil Oestroidea member described until that time.

== Paleoecology ==
Members of the family Mesembrinellidae are found exclusively in the Neotropical forests from the Yucatán south to the Buenos Aires region of South America. There are no records of living species on the Caribbean islands other than Trinidad and Tobago. The Dominican amber forest has been reconstructed as a tropical forest with streams, clearings and ponds reminiscent of the modern forests on Hispaniola. Based on what is known of modern mesembrinellid biology and the paleoenvironment of the Dominican amber forest, Cerretti et al suggested that M. caenozoica was a shade loving forest species with only a small habitat change tolerance, and with the movement of the paleo-Caribbean islands away from the mainland or with the climate changes through the Miocene the species went extinct.

== Phylogeny ==
Based on a phylogenetic analysis of Mesembrinellidae species along with other Oestroidea, Cerretti et al placed M. caenozoica as a sister species to the living species M. facialis in an expanded circumscription of the genus which includes all Mesembrinellidae species. The clade formed by M. caenozoica and M. facialis, is in turn sister to the clade formed by the species M. patriciae, M. nigripes; and M. perisi. The species in the two clades include all species that are sometimes treated in the genera Laneella and Souzalopesiella when Mesembrinella is split up. The two clades are basal and sister to all the other species of Mesembrinella.

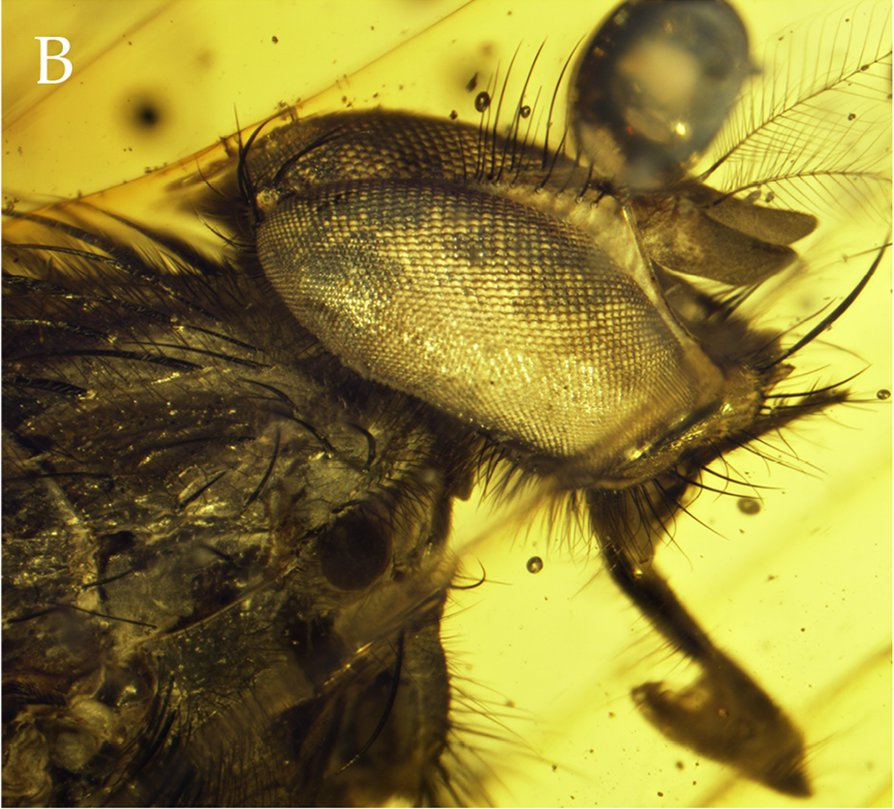
Head in profile

- Oestroidea
  - Other Oestroidea
  - - Ulurumyiidae
    - Mesembrinellidae
      - - M. species 2
        - - M. species 1
          - M. latifrons
      - - - M. caenozoica
          - M. facialis
        - - M. perisi
          - M. patriciae
          - M. nigripes

== Description ==
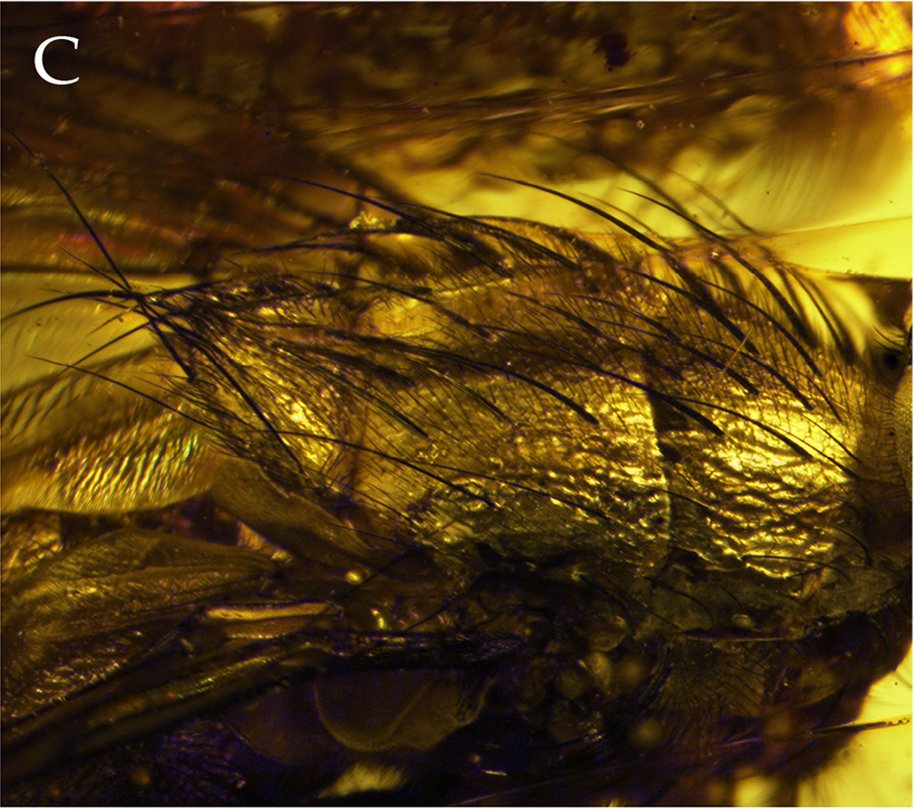
Thorax with hairs

The M. caenozoica male is 8.5 mm (0.33 in) long, with a black to dark brown abdomen with possible red coloration if viewed at certain angles. The legs are mostly dark brown to blackish brown, with the tibiae and femora also showing reddish or yellowish tones at certain angles of view and the pulvilli darkened. The thorax is also a uniform black to dark brown and the edges of both the metathoracic and prothoracic spiracles are dark brown. The area of the head between the eyes and frontal suture up to the antenna and below the eyes are a yellowish brown in tone. The scape and pedicel of the antennae are black, the postpedicel has a dark brown upper portion and a yellowish underside near the tip. The arista is mostly yellow in tone, though the base of the third aristomere is slightly darkened. The wing is hyaline in coloration with the well developed Alula being composed of an upper whitish calypter and lower infuscated calypter.
