= Mesembrinella cyaneicincta =

Scientific classification
- Kingdom: Animalia
- Phylum: Arthropoda
- Class: Insecta
- Order: Diptera
- Family: Mesembrinellidae
- Subfamily: Mesembrinellinae
- Genus: Mesembrinella
- Species: M. cyaneicincta

Binomial name
- Mesembrinella cyaneicincta (Surcouf, 1919)

Synonyms
- Ochromyia cyaneicincta Surcouf, 1919

Species of fly

Mesembrinella cyaneicincta is a species of fly in the family Mesembrinellidae.

== Distribution ==
Brazil.
