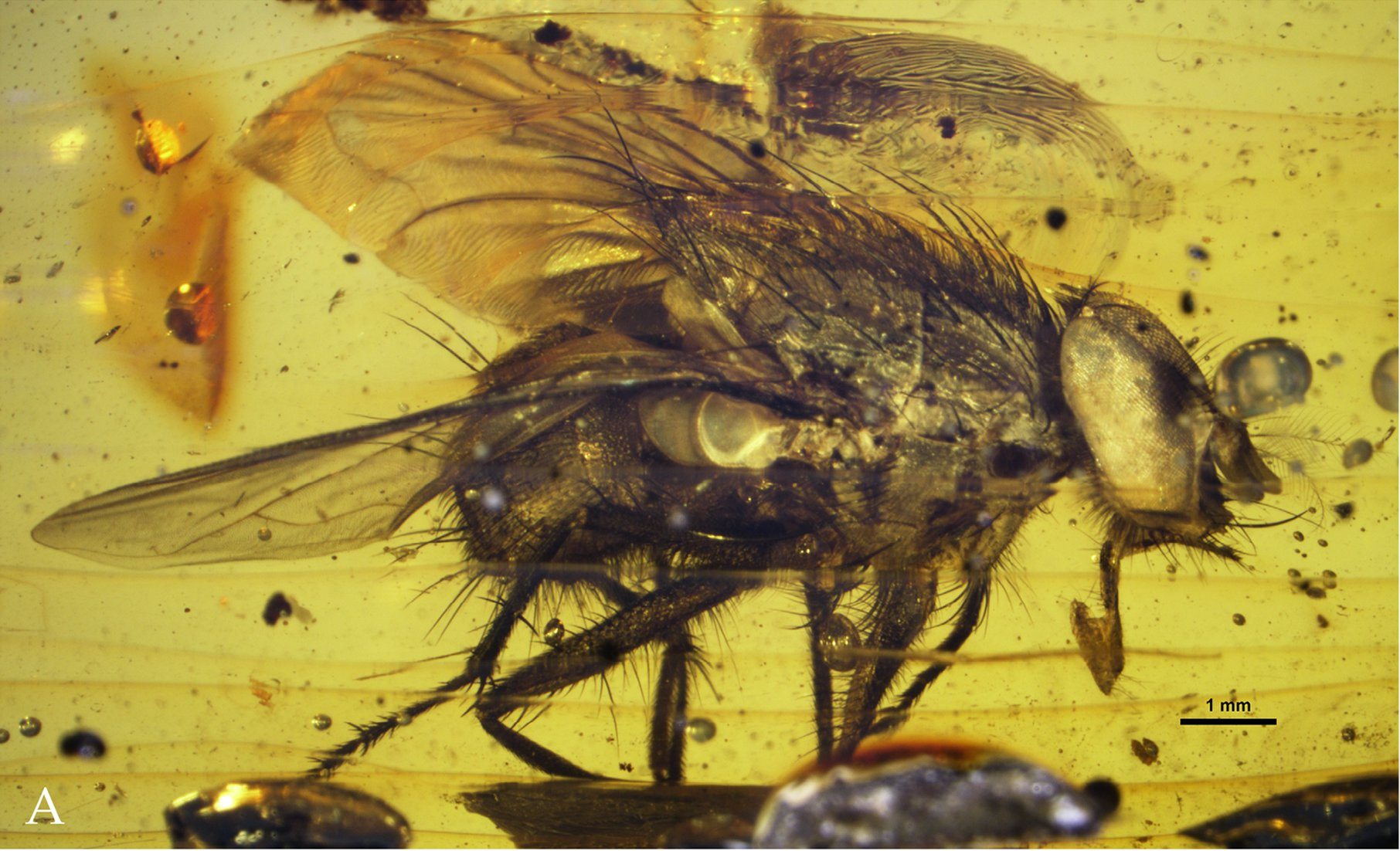
- Mesembrinella caenozoica in Dominican amber

Scientific classification
- Kingdom: Animalia
- Phylum: Arthropoda
- Clade: Pancrustacea
- Class: Insecta
- Order: Diptera
- Section: Schizophora
- Subsection: Calyptratae
- Superfamily: Oestroidea
- Family: Mesembrinellidae; Shannon, 1926

Subfamilies
- Laneellinae; Mesembrinellinae; Souzalopesiellinae

= Mesembrinellidae =

Family of flies

Mesembrinellidae is a family of Neotropical flies in the order Diptera, and formerly included in the Calliphoridae. There are 36 described species.

== Taxonomy ==
- Subfamily Laneellinae Guimarães, 1977

- Laneella Mello, 1967

- Laneella fusconitida Whitworth, 2019
- Laneella fuscosquamata Whitworth, 2019
- Laneella nigripes Guimarães, 1977
- Laneella patriciae (Wolff, 2013)
- Laneella perisi (Mariluis, 1987)
- Laneella purpurea Whitworth, 2019

- Subfamily Mesembrinellinae Giglio-Tos, 1893

- Mesembrinella Giglio-Tos, 1893

- Mesembrinella aeneiventris (Wiedemann, 1830)
- Mesembrinella andina (Wolff, Bonatto & Carvalho, 2014)
- Mesembrinella anomala (Guimarães, 1977)
- Mesembrinella apollinaris Séguy, 1925
- Mesembrinella batesi Aldrich, 1922
- Mesembrinella bellardiana Aldrich, 1922
- Mesembrinella bicolor (Fabricius, 1805)
- Mesembrinella bolivar (Bonatto, 2005)
- Mesembrinella brunnipes Surcouf, 1919
- Mesembrinella bullata Whitworth, 2019
- †Mesembrinella caenozoica Cerretti et al., 2017
- Mesembrinella carvalhoi (Wolff, Ramos-Pastrana & Pujol-Luz, 2013)
- Mesembrinella chantryi Whitworth, 2019
- Mesembrinella confusa Séguy, 1925
- Mesembrinella cordillera (Wolff & Ramos-Pastrana, 2017)
- Mesembrinella currani Guimarães, 1977
- Mesembrinella cyaneicincta (Surcouf, 1919)
- Mesembrinella decrepita Séguy, 1925
- Mesembrinella dorsimacula Aldrich, 1922
- Mesembrinella epandrioaurantia Whitworth, 2019
- Mesembrinella flavicrura Aldrich, 1925
- Mesembrinella flavipennis (Macquart, 1844)
- Mesembrinella formosa Aldrich, 1932
- Mesembrinella fuscicosta Séguy, 1925
- Mesembrinella grajauensis (Mello, 1967)
- Mesembrinella guaramacalensis Whitworth, 2019
- Mesembrinella incompleta Curran, 1934
- Mesembrinella lanei (Mello, 1967)
- Mesembrinella lara (Bonatto, 2005)
- Mesembrinella latifrons (Mello, 1967)
- Mesembrinella longicercus Whitworth, 2019
- Mesembrinella mexicana Whitworth, 2019
- Mesembrinella nigrifrons (Bigot, 1878)
- Mesembrinella nigrocoerulea Whitworth, 2019
- Mesembrinella obscura (Wolff, 2017)
- Mesembrinella pauciseta Aldrich, 1922
- Mesembrinella peregrina Aldrich, 1922
- Mesembrinella pictipennis Aldrich, 1922
- Mesembrinella purpurata Aldrich, 1922
- Mesembrinella randa (Walker, 1849)
- Mesembrinella semiflava Aldrich, 1925
- Mesembrinella semihyalina Mello, 1967
- Mesembrinella serrata Whitworth, 2019
- Mesembrinella socors (Walker, 1861)
- Mesembrinella spicata Aldrich, 1925
- Mesembrinella townsendi Guimarães, 1977
- Mesembrinella transposita Séguy, 1925
- Mesembrinella umbrosa Aldrich, 1922
- Mesembrinella uniseta Aldrich, 1925
- Mesembrinella velasquezae Whitworth, 2019
- Mesembrinella violacea Whitworth, 2019
- Mesembrinella vogelsangi (Mello, 1967)
- Mesembrinella woodorum Whitworth, 2019
- Mesembrinella xanthorrhina (Bigot, 1887)
- Mesembrinella zurquiensis Whitworth, 2019

- Subfamily Souzalopesiellinae Guimarães, 1977

- Souzalopesiella Guimarães, 1977

- Souzalopesiella facialis (Aldrich, 1922)
