= Celidosphenella =

Scientific classification
- Kingdom: Animalia
- Phylum: Arthropoda
- Class: Insecta
- Order: Diptera
- Family: Tephritidae
- Subfamily: Tephritinae
- Tribe: Tephritini
- Genus: Celidosphenella; Hendel, 1914

Type species
- Celidosphenella maculata Hendel, 1914

Synonyms
- Melanotrypana Hering, 1944

Genus of flies

Celidosphenella is a genus of tephritid or fruit flies in the family Tephritidae.

== Species ==
- Celidosphenella bella (Blanchard, 1854)
- Celidosphenella benoisti (Séguy, 1933)
- Celidosphenella diespasmena (Schiner, 1868)
- Celidosphenella maculata Hendel, 1914
- Celidosphenella poecila (Schiner, 1868)
- Celidosphenella simulata (Malloch, 1933)
- Celidosphenella stonei (Stuardo Ortiz, 1946)
- Celidosphenella vidua (Hering, 1942)
