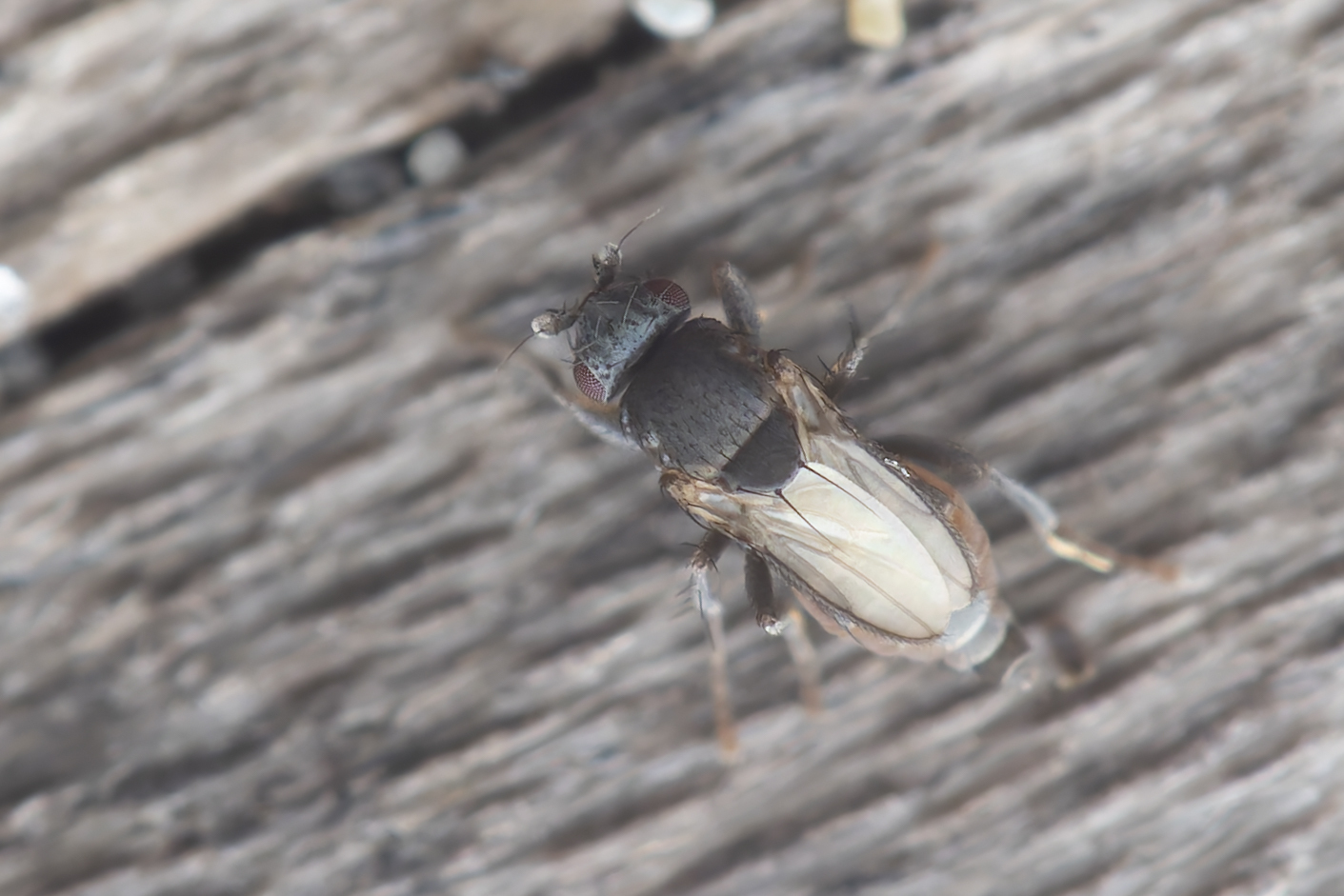
- Thoracochaeta harrisoni

Scientific classification
- Kingdom: Animalia
- Phylum: Arthropoda
- Class: Insecta
- Order: Diptera
- Family: Sphaeroceridae
- Subfamily: Limosininae
- Genus: Thoracochaeta; Duda, 1918

Type species
- Borborus zosterae Haliday, 1833

Synonyms
- Toracochaeta Kuznetzova, 1986

= Thoracochaeta =

Genus of flies

Thoracochaeta is a genus of flies belonging to the family Sphaeroceridae.

== Species ==
- T. accola Roháček & Marshall, 2000
- T. acinaces Roháček & Marshall, 2000
- T. alia Marshall & Roháček, 2000
- T. ancudensis (Richards, 1931)
- T. arnaudi (Richards, 1963)
- T. bajaminuta (Marshall, 1982)
- T. brachystoma (Stenhammar, 1855)
- T. calminuta (Marshall, 1982)
- T. cercalis Roháček & Marshall, 2000
- T. conglobata Marshall & Roháček, 2000
- T. cubita Marshall & Norrbom, 1985
- T. erectiseta Carles-Tolrá, 1994
- T. falx Marshall & Roháček, 2000
- T. flaminuta (Marshall, 1982)
- T. gemina Roháček & Marshall, 2000
- T. harrisoni Marshall & Roháček, 2000
- T. hirsutimera Marshall & Roháček, 2000
- T. imitatrix Marshall & Roháček, 2000
- T. johnsoni (Spuler, 1925)
- T. lanx Roháček & Marshall, 2000
- T. mediterranea Munari, 1989
- T. miranda Roháček & Marshall, 2000
- T. mucronata Marshall & Roháček, 2000
- T. neofucicola Marshall & Roháček, 2000
- T. pauliani (Séguy, 1954)
- T. peculiaris (Richards, 1973)
- T. pertica Marshall & Roháček, 2000
- T. pugillaris Marshall & Roháček, 2000
- T. securis Marshall & Roháček, 2000
- T. seticosta (Spuler, 1925)
- T. setifer Hayashi, 2005
- T. teskeyi (Marshall, 1982)
- T. valentinei Roháček & Marshall, 2000
- T. zealandica (Harrison, 1959)
- T. zosterae (Haliday, 1833)
