= Pseudonapomyza =

Scientific classification
- Kingdom: Animalia
- Phylum: Arthropoda
- Class: Insecta
- Order: Diptera
- Family: Agromyzidae
- Subfamily: Phytomyzinae
- Genus: Pseudonapomyza; Hendel, 1920

Type species
- Phytomyza atra Meigen, 1830

Genus of flies

Pseudonapomyza is a genus of flies in the family Agromyzidae.

== Species ==
- Pseudonapomyza acanthacearum (Spencer, 1959)
- Pseudonapomyza afrospicata Zlobin, 2002
- Pseudonapomyza alternantherae (Séguy, 1951)
- Pseudonapomyza andorrensis Cerný, 2007
- Pseudonapomyza asiatica Spencer, 1961
- Pseudonapomyza asystasiae Spencer, 1965
- Pseudonapomyza atra (Meigen, 1830)
- Pseudonapomyza atrata (Malloch, 1914)
- Pseudonapomyza atratula Zlobin, 2002
- Pseudonapomyza atronitens Zlobin, 2002
- Pseudonapomyza australiana Zlobin, 1993
- Pseudonapomyza azizi Singh & Ipe, 1973
- Pseudonapomyza balkanensis Spencer, 1973
- Pseudonapomyza benifassae Gil-Ortiz, 2013
- Pseudonapomyza bifida Zlobin, 2002
- Pseudonapomyza caspica Zlobin, 2002
- Pseudonapomyza cingulata Sasakawa, 1963
- Pseudonapomyza conchata Zlobin, 2002
- Pseudonapomyza confusa Zlobin, 1993
- Pseudonapomyza cornigera Zlobin, 2002
- Pseudonapomyza coutalamensis (Beri & Ipe, 1971)
- Pseudonapomyza deserta Zlobin, 2002
- Pseudonapomyza dilatata Sasakawa, 1963
- Pseudonapomyza diminua (Spencer, 1961)
- Pseudonapomyza domestica Singh & Ipe, 1973
- Pseudonapomyza embuensis Spencer, 1985
- Pseudonapomyza embui Spencer, 1985
- Pseudonapomyza errata Zlobin, 1993
- Pseudonapomyza eurasiatica Zlobin, 2002
- Pseudonapomyza europaea Spencer, 1973
- Pseudonapomyza fabulosa Spencer, 1966
- Pseudonapomyza flavolunulata (Sasakawa, 1963)
- Pseudonapomyza gambica Zlobin, 2002
- Pseudonapomyza gilletti Spencer, 1985
- Pseudonapomyza grandiosa (Spencer, 1961)
- Pseudonapomyza gujaratica Shah, 1982
- Pseudonapomyza hamata Zlobin, 2002
- Pseudonapomyza hispanica Spencer, 1973
- Pseudonapomyza hobokensis Scheirs, 1996
- Pseudonapomyza hohmanni Spencer, 1965
- Pseudonapomyza hungarica Spencer, 1973
- Pseudonapomyza hungarorum Cerný, 2017
- Pseudonapomyza hypoestis Hering, 1957
- Pseudonapomyza hypoestivora (Séguy, 1951)
- Pseudonapomyza insularis Zlobin, 1993
- Pseudonapomyza istrensis Zlobin, 2002
- Pseudonapomyza jacutica Zlobin, 2002
- Pseudonapomyza justiciae Spencer, 1990
- Pseudonapomyza kobdosana Zlobin, 2002
- Pseudonapomyza kyzylkumica Zlobin, 2002
- Pseudonapomyza lacteipennis (Malloch, 1913)
- Pseudonapomyza lucentis Spencer, 1959
- Pseudonapomyza malayensis Spencer, 1973
- Pseudonapomyza malheri Singh & Ipe, 1973
- Pseudonapomyza matopi Spencer, 1965
- Pseudonapomyza media (Spencer, 1961)
- Pseudonapomyza mediterranea Gil-Ortiz, 2010
- Pseudonapomyza memorata Spencer, 1977
- Pseudonapomyza mohelnica Cerný, 1992
- Pseudonapomyza mongoliensis Spencer, 1973
- Pseudonapomyza moraviae Cerný, 1992
- Pseudonapomyza multimoda Spencer, 1966
- Pseudonapomyza nepalensis Zlobin, 2002
- Pseudonapomyza nigralis Spencer, 1961
- Pseudonapomyza nikolayi Zlobin, 2002
- Pseudonapomyza odessae Cerný, 1998
- Pseudonapomyza ommata Sasakawa, 2004
- Pseudonapomyza ovalis Zlobin, 2002
- Pseudonapomyza palavae Cerný, 1998
- Pseudonapomyza pallidinervis Zlobin, 2002
- Pseudonapomyza palliditarsis Cerný, 1992
- Pseudonapomyza parilis Spencer, 1977
- Pseudonapomyza perspicua Spencer, 1963
- Pseudonapomyza philippinensis Spencer, 1961
- Pseudonapomyza pollicicornis Zlobin, 2002
- Pseudonapomyza probata Spencer, 1977
- Pseudonapomyza projecta Zlobin, 2002
- Pseudonapomyza pudica Spencer, 1977
- Pseudonapomyza pyriformis Sasakawa, 2008
- Pseudonapomyza quatei Sasakawa, 1963
- Pseudonapomyza rampae Spencer, 1986
- Pseudonapomyza rara Spencer, 1977
- Pseudonapomyza ruiruensis Spencer, 1985
- Pseudonapomyza rungiae (Singh & Ipe, 1968)
- Pseudonapomyza salubris Spencer, 1977
- Pseudonapomyza sandaliformis Zlobin, 2002
- Pseudonapomyza siciformis Zlobin, 2002
- Pseudonapomyza similis Spencer, 1985
- Pseudonapomyza spenceri Cerný, 1992
- Pseudonapomyza spicata (Malloch, 1914)
- Pseudonapomyza spinosa Spencer, 1973
- Pseudonapomyza strobliana Spencer, 1973
- Pseudonapomyza subspinosa Spencer, 1985
- Pseudonapomyza sueciae Zlobin, 2005
- Pseudonapomyza trilobata Sasakawa, 1963
- Pseudonapomyza urundensis (Spencer, 1959)
- Pseudonapomyza ustyurtica Zlobin, 2002
- Pseudonapomyza vernoniae (Séguy, 1951)
- Pseudonapomyza vota Spencer, 1973
- Pseudonapomyza zambiana Cerný, 2008
- Pseudonapomyza zeae Spencer, 1973
