= Laneellinae =

Scientific classification
- Kingdom: Animalia
- Phylum: Arthropoda
- Class: Insecta
- Order: Diptera
- Subsection: Calyptratae
- Superfamily: Oestroidea
- Family: Mesembrinellidae
- Subfamily: Laneellinae; Guimarães, 1977

Subfamily of flies

Laneellinae is a subfamily of Neotropical flies in the family Mesembrinellidae, and formerly placed in the Calliphoridae.

== Genera & Species ==
- Laneella Mello, 1967

- Laneella fusconitida Whitworth, 2019
- Laneella fuscosquamata Whitworth, 2019
- Laneella nigripes Guimarães, 1977
- Laneella patriciae (Wolff, 2013)
- Laneella perisi (Mariluis, 1987)
- Laneella purpurea Whitworth, 2019
