= Laneella =

Scientific classification
- Kingdom: Animalia
- Phylum: Arthropoda
- Class: Insecta
- Order: Diptera
- Family: Mesembrinellidae
- Subfamily: Laneellinae
- Genus: Laneella; Mello, 1967

Type species
- Mesembrinella brunnipes Surcouf, 1919

Genus of flies

Laneella is a genus of flies in the family Mesembrinellidae.

== Species ==
- Laneella fusconitida Whitworth, 2019
- Laneella fuscosquamata Whitworth, 2019
- Laneella nigripes Guimarães, 1977
- Laneella patriciae (Wolff, 2013)
- Laneella perisi (Mariluis, 1987)
- Laneella purpurea Whitworth, 2019
