= Celidosphenella benoisti =

Scientific classification
- Kingdom: Animalia
- Phylum: Arthropoda
- Class: Insecta
- Order: Diptera
- Family: Tephritidae
- Subfamily: Tephritinae
- Tribe: Tephritini
- Genus: Celidosphenella
- Species: C. benoisti

Binomial name
- Celidosphenella benoisti (Séguy, 1933)

Synonyms
- Acanthiophilus benoisti Séguy, 1933

Species of fly

Celidosphenella benoisti is a species of tephritid or fruit flies in the genus Celidosphenella of the family Tephritidae.

== Distribution ==
Ecuador.
