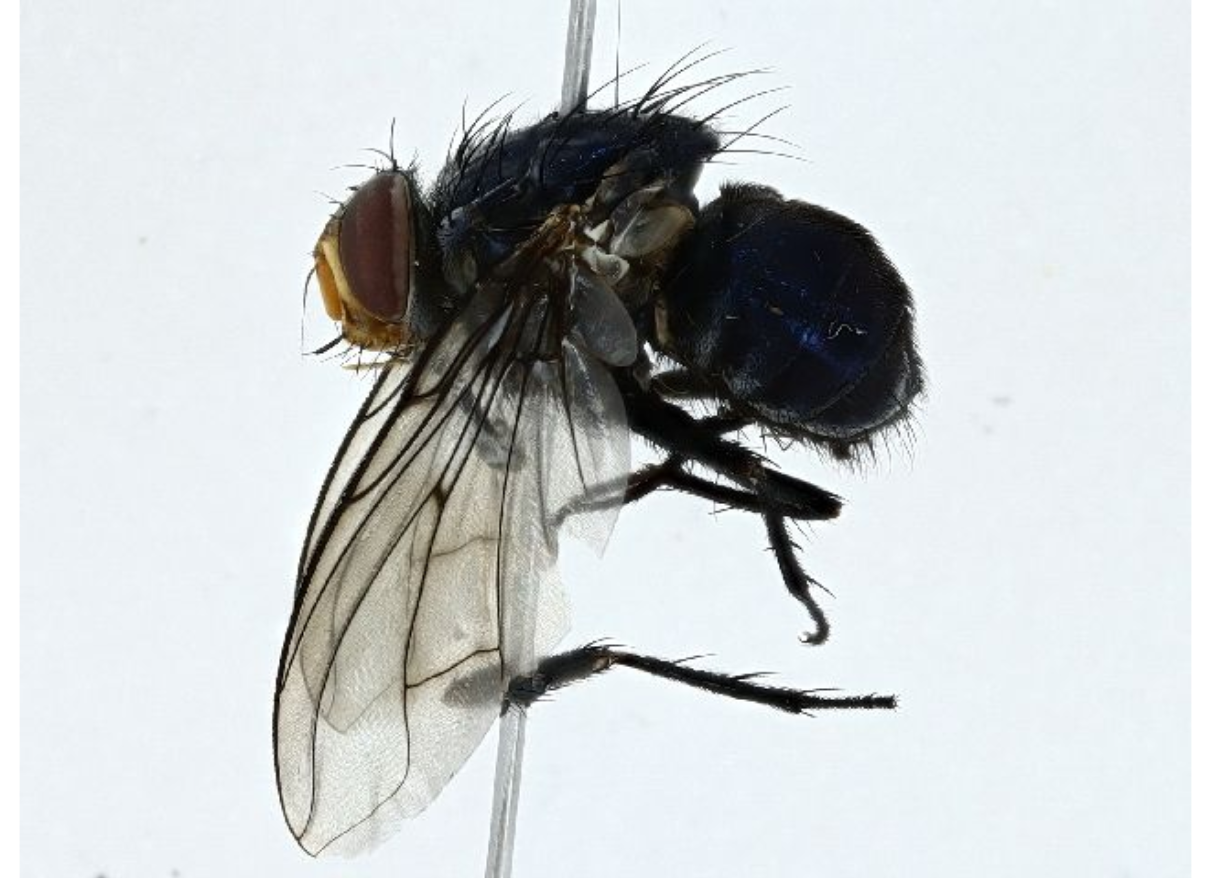

Scientific classification
- Kingdom: Animalia
- Phylum: Arthropoda
- Class: Insecta
- Order: Diptera
- Family: Mesembrinellidae
- Genus: Mesembrinella
- Species: M. xanthorrhina

Binomial name
- Mesembrinella xanthorrhina (Bigot, 1887)

Synonyms
- Calliphora xanthorrhina Bigot, 1887; Mesembrinella bequaerti Séguy, 1925; Mesembrinella chrysorhoea Brauer, 1895

= Mesembrinella xanthorrhina =

Species of fly

Mesembrinella xanthorrhina is a species of fly in the family Mesembrinellidae. Its range extends from southern Mexico to Peru and Venezuela.
