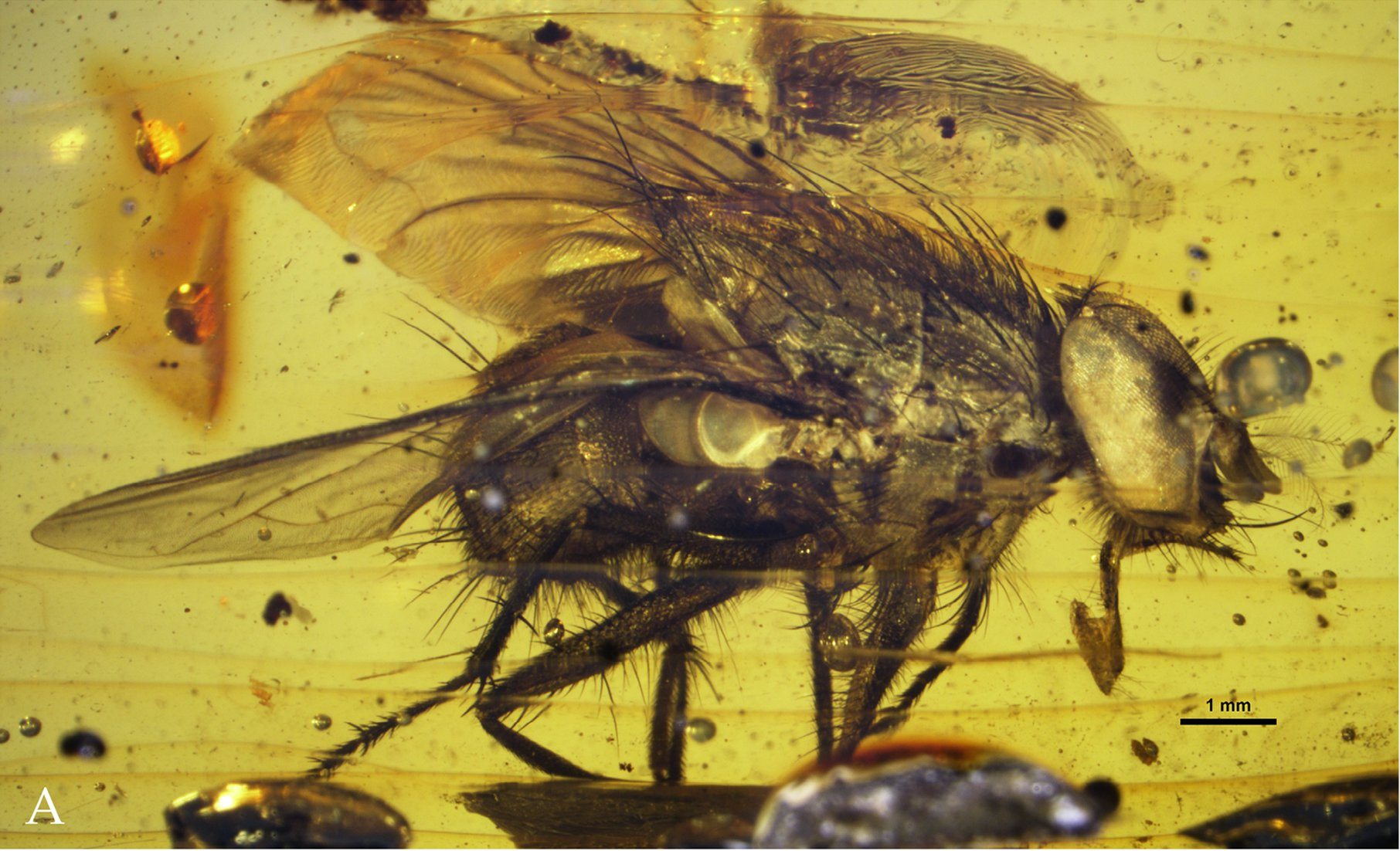
- Mesembrinella caenozoica in Dominican amber

Scientific classification
- Kingdom: Animalia
- Phylum: Arthropoda
- Clade: Pancrustacea
- Class: Insecta
- Order: Diptera
- Subsection: Calyptratae
- Superfamily: Oestroidea
- Family: Mesembrinellidae
- Subfamily: Mesembrinellinae; Giglio-Tos, 1893

= Mesembrinellinae =

Subfamily of flies

Mesembrinellinae is a subfamily of Neotropical flies in the order Diptera, and formerly included in the Calliphoridae. There are 33 described living species.

== Taxonomy ==
- Albuquerquea Mello, 1967

- A. latifrons Mello, 1967

- Eumesembrinella Townsend, 1931

- E. benoisti (Séguy, 1925)
- E. cyaneicincta (Surcouf, 1919)
- E. quadrilineata (Fabricius, 1805)
- E. randa (Walker, 1849)

- Giovanella Bonatto and Marinoni, 2005

- G. bolivar Bonatto and Marinoni, 2005
- G. carvalhoi Wolff et al., 2013

- Henriquella Bonatto and Marinon, 2005

- H. spicata (Aldrich, 1925)

- Huascaromusca Townsend, 1931

- H. aeneiventris (Wiedemann, 1830)
- H. bequaerti (Séguy, 1925)
- H. decrepita (Séguy, 1925)
- H. lara Bonatto and Marinoni, 2005
- H. purpurata (Aldrich, 1922)
- H. semiflava (Aldrich, 1925)
- H. uniseta (Aldrich, 1925)
- H. vogelsangi Mello, 1967

- Mesembrinella Giglio-Tos, 1893

- M. abaca (Hall, 1948)
- M. apollinaris Séguy, 1925
- M. batesi Aldrich, 1922
- M. bellardiana Aldrich, 1922
- M. bicolor (Fabricius, 1805)
- M. brunnipes Surcouf, 1919
- †M. caenozoica Cerretti et al, 2017
- M. currani Guimarães, 1977
- M. flavicrura Aldrich, 1925
- M. patriciae Wolff, 2013
- M. peregrina Aldrich, 1922
- M. pictipennis Aldrich, 1922
- M. semihyalina Mello, 1967
- M. townsendi Guimarães, 1977
- M. umbrosa Aldrich, 1922
- M. xanthorrina (Bigot, 1887)

- Thompsoniella Guimarães, 1977

- T. andina Wolff et al., 2014
- T. anomala Guimarães, 1977
