= Giovanella (disambiguation) =

Giovanella may refer to:

== Zoology ==
- Giovanella, a genus of flies from South America

== Person ==
- Everton Giovanella, Brazilian footballer
- Mattia Giovanella (born 1997), Italian curler
