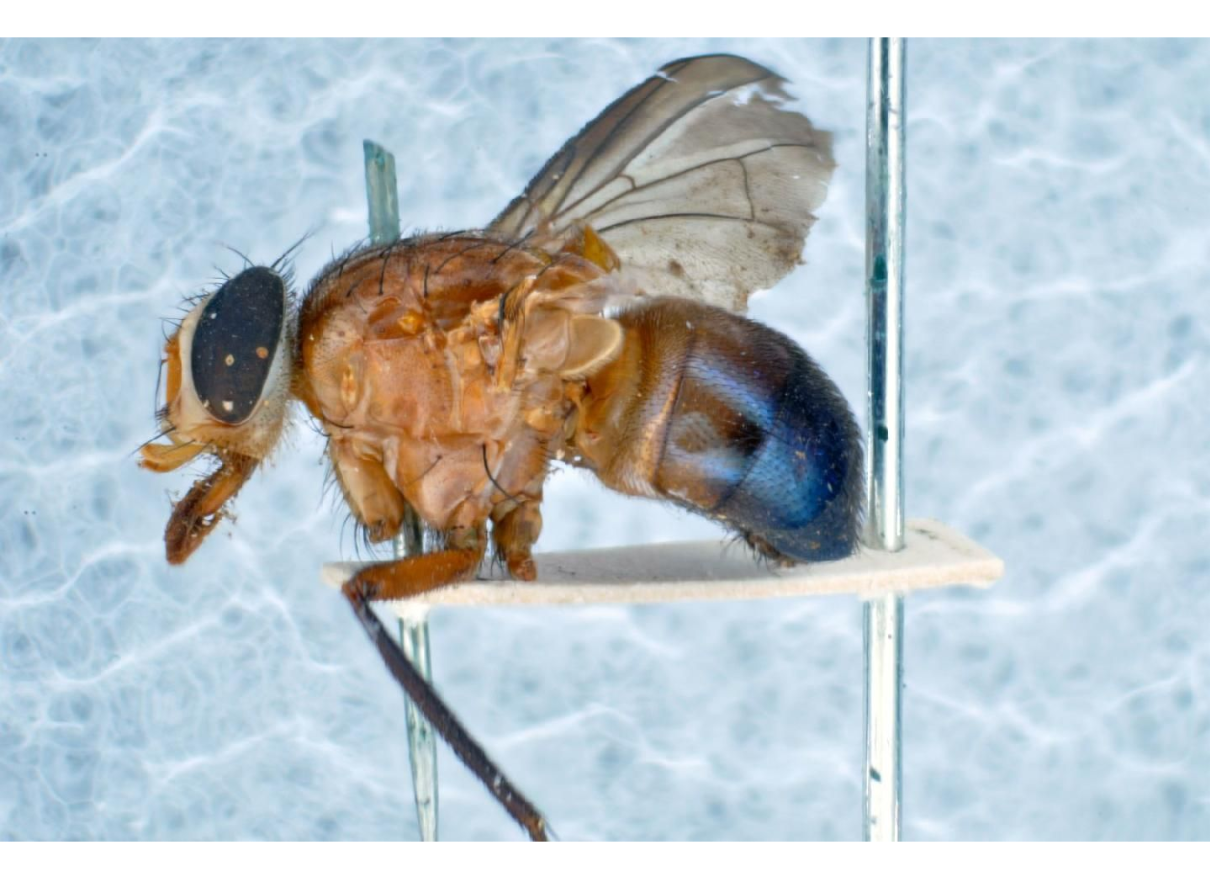
- Museum specimen

Scientific classification
- Kingdom: Animalia
- Phylum: Arthropoda
- Class: Insecta
- Order: Diptera
- Family: Mesembrinellidae
- Subfamily: Mesembrinellinae
- Genus: Mesembrinella
- Species: M. randa

Binomial name
- Mesembrinella randa (Walker, 1849)

Synonyms
- Dexia randa Walker, 1849

= Mesembrinella randa =

Species of fly

Mesembrinella randa is a species of fly in the family Mesembrinellidae. It is found in Guyana, French Guiana, Surinam, and Brazil.
