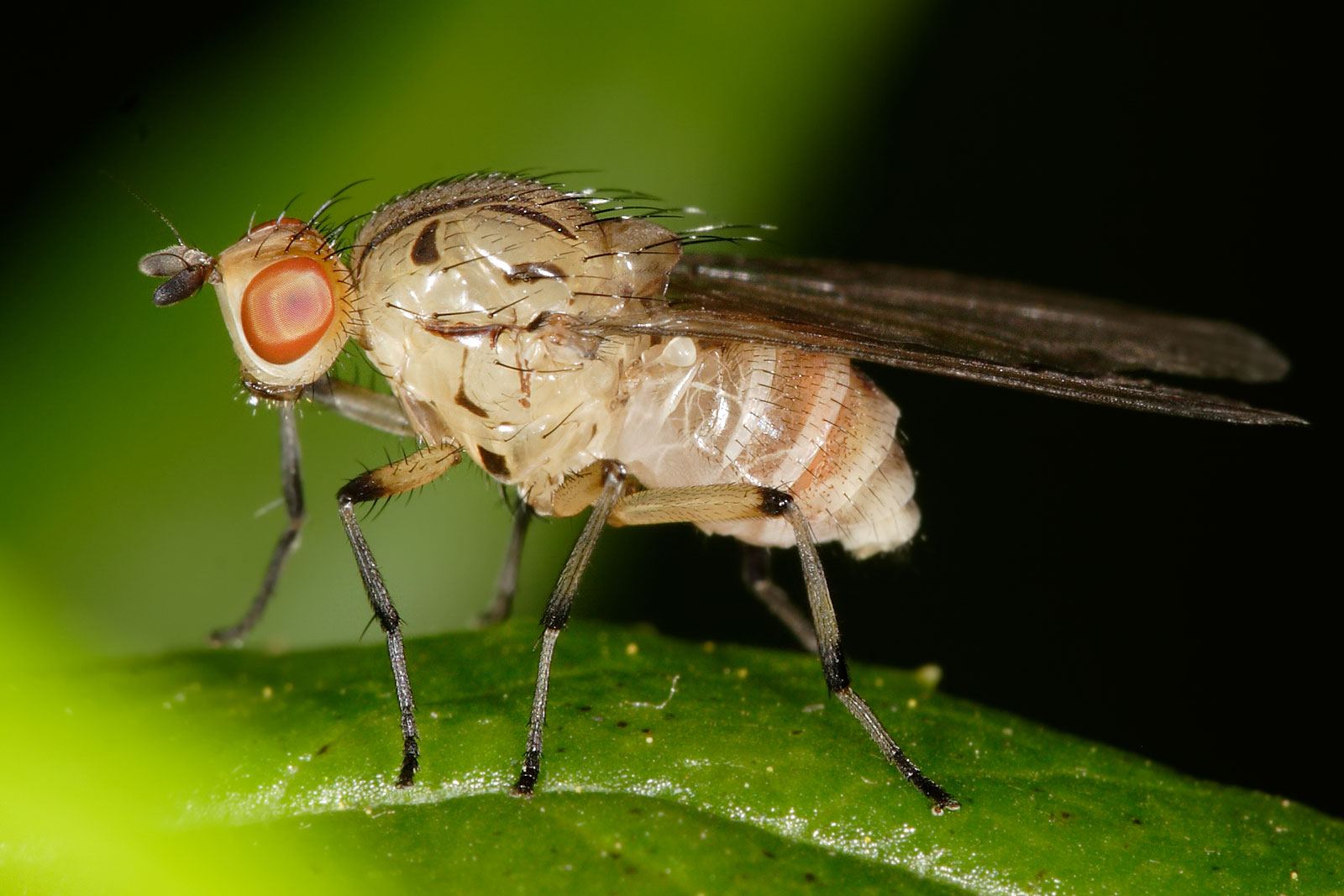
- An Australian species
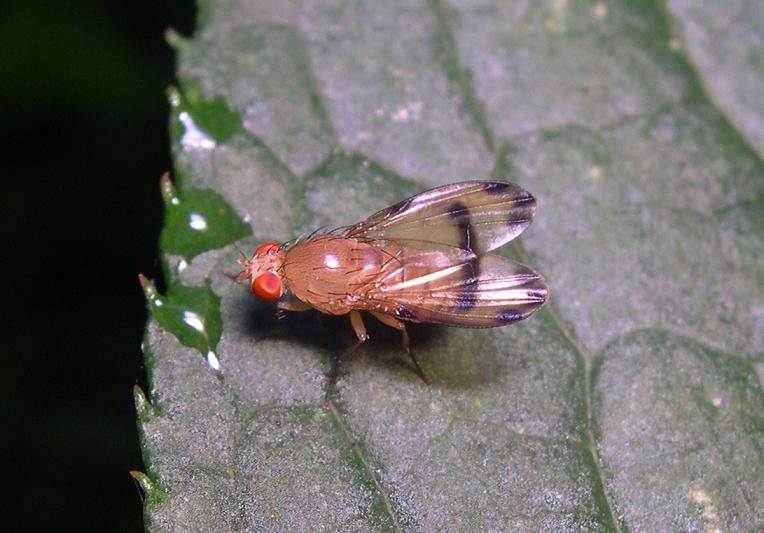
- Homoneura hirayamae

Scientific classification
- Kingdom: Animalia
- Phylum: Arthropoda
- Clade: Pancrustacea
- Class: Insecta
- Order: Diptera
- Family: Lauxaniidae
- Subfamily: Homoneurinae
- Genus: Homoneura; Wulp, 1891

Type species
- Homoneura picea Wulp, 1891

= Homoneura =

Genus of flies

Homoneura is a genus of fly that belongs to the family Lauxaniidae.

== Species ==
This genus contains many species. A list of them can be found below:

- H. abnormis Gao & Yang, 2004
- H. aequalis (Malloch, 1914)
- H. aldrichi Miller, 1977
- H. americana (Wiedemann, 1830)
- H. apicomata Shi & Yang, 2009
- H. arizonensis Miller, 1977
- H. bakeri Miller, 1977
- H. bergenstammi Czerny, 1932
- H. biconcava Shi, Wang & Yang, 2011
- H. birdi Miller, 1977
- H. bispina (Loew, 1861)
- H. bistriata (Kertész, 1915)
- H. biumbrata (Loew, 1873)
- H. brevis Gao & Yang, 2004
- H. californica Miller, 1977
- H. canariensis (Becker, 1908)
- H. chelis Carles-Tolra, 1996
- H. christophi (Becker, 1895)
- H. cilifera (Malloch, 1914)
- H. clavata Miller, 1977
- H. columnaria Shi & Yang, 2009
- H. conjuncta (Johnson, 1914)
- H. consobrina (Zetterstedt, 1847)
- H. convergens Shi & Yang, 2009
- H. cornuta Sasakawa, 2001
- H. crickettae Miller, 1977
- H. curva Miller, 1977
- H. denticuligera Shi, Wang & Yang, 2011
- H. dilecta (Rondani, 1868)
- H. disciformis Shi, Wang & Yang, 2011
- H. disjuncta (Johnson, 1914)
- H. elliptica Shi, Wang & Yang, 2011
- H. ericpoli Carles-Tolra, 1993
- H. flabella Miller, 1977
- H. flavida Shi & Yang, 2009
- H. fratercula (Malloch, 1920)
- H. fraterna Loew, 1861)
- H. fuscibasis (Malloch, 1920)
- H. guangdongica Shi, Wang & Yang, 2011
- H. harti (Malloch, 1914)
- H. hospes Allen, 1989
- H. houghii (Coquillett, 1898)
- H. imitatrix (Malloch, 1920)
- H. immaculata (de Meijere, 1910)
- H. inaequalis (Malloch, 1914)
- H. incerta (Malloch, 1914)
- H. interstincta (Fallén, 1820)
- H. jiangi Gao & Yang, 2004
- H. johnsoni Miller, 1977
- H. knowltoni Miller, 1977
- H. kortzasi Tsacas, 1959
- H. lamellata (Becker, 1895)
- H. lamellata Becker, 1895)
- H. latissima Shi & Yang, 2009
- H. licina Séguy, 1941
- H. limnea (Becker, 1895)
- H. littoralis (Malloch, 1915)
- H. longicomata Shi, Wang & Yang, 2011
- H. longispina Gao & Yang, 2004
- H. mallochi Miller, 1977
- H. media Miller, 1977
- H. mediospinosa Merz, 2003
- H. melanderi (Johnson, 1914)
- H. minor (Becker, 1895)
- H. modesta (Loew, 1857)
- H. nebulosa Sasakawa, 2011
- H. nigrimarginata Shi, Wang & Yang, 2011
- H. nigritarsis Shi & Yang, 2009
- H. notata (Fallén, 1820)
- H. nubila (Melander, 1913)
- H. nubilifera (Malloch, 1920)
- H. occidentalis (Malloch, 1920)
- H. octostriata Czerny, 1932
- H. ocula Miller, 1977
- H. ornatipes (Johnson, 1914)
- H. patelliformis (Becker, 1895)
- H. pernotata (Malloch, 1920)
- H. philadelphica (Macquart, 1843)
- H. picea Wulp, 1891
- H. picta (de Meijere, 1904)
- H. psammophila Miller, 1977
- H. pufujii Shi, Wang & Yang, 2011
- H. quadrifera Shi, Wang & Yang, 2011
- H. remmi Papp, 1978
- H. semicircularis Shi & Yang, 2009
- H. serrata Gao & Yang, 2002,
- H. setitibia Shewell, 1940
- H. setula Miller, 1977
- H. severini Shewell, 1939
- H. sheldoni (Coquillett, 1898)
- H. shewelli Miller, 1977
- H. singularis Yang, Hu & Zhu, 2002
- H. tenera (Loew, 1846)
- H. tenuispina Loew, 1861)
- H. tesquae (Becker, 1895)
- H. thalhammeri Papp, 1978
- H. tianeensis Gao & Yang, 2004
- H. tianlinensis Gao & Yang, 2004
- H. tortifurcata Shi & Yang, 2009
- H. transversa (Wiedemann, 1830)
- H. trochantera Miller, 1977
- H. truncata Miller, 1977
- H. unguiculata (Kertész, 1913)
- H. utahensis Miller, 1977
- H. wheeleri Miller, 1977
- H. yinggelingica Shi & Yang, 2009
- H. zhangae Shi & Yang, 2009
