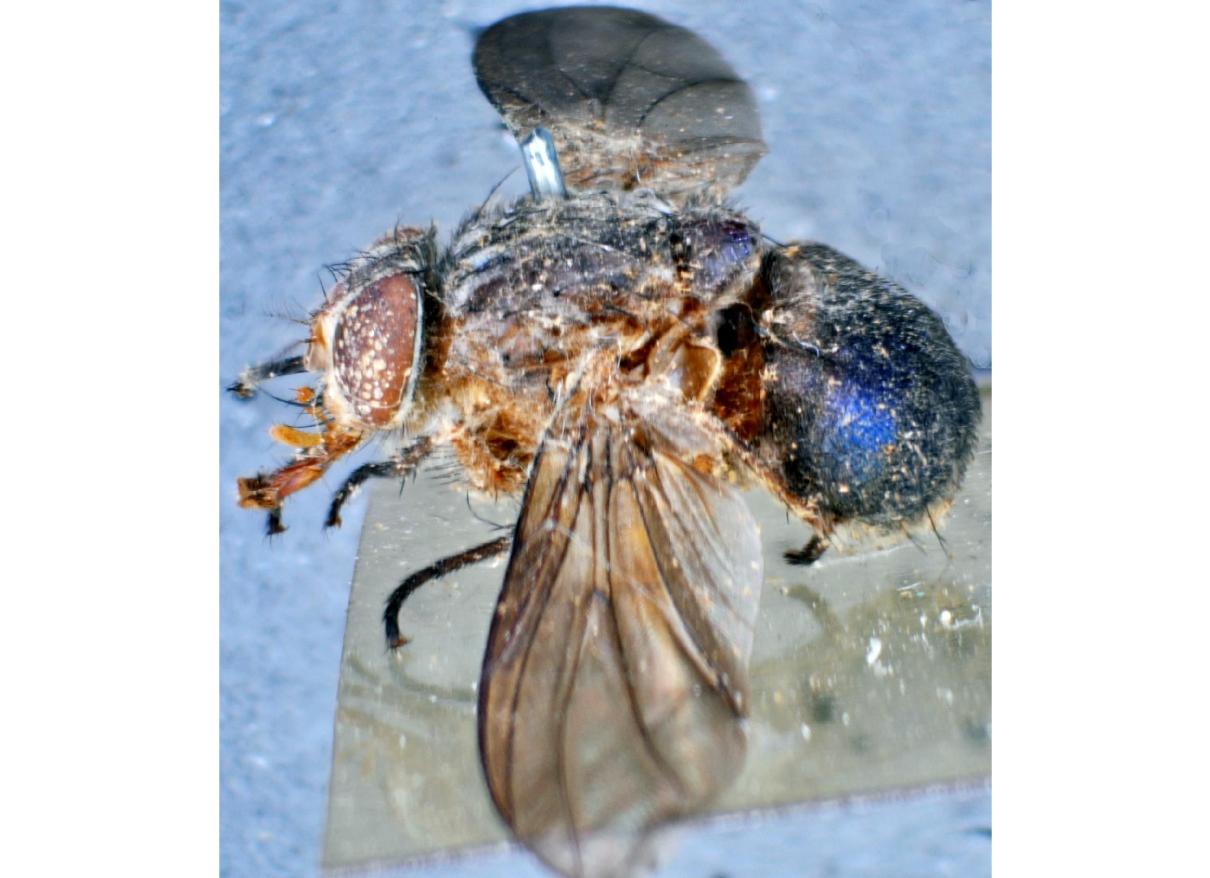
- Holotype specimen

Scientific classification
- Kingdom: Animalia
- Phylum: Arthropoda
- Class: Insecta
- Order: Diptera
- Family: Mesembrinellidae
- Subfamily: Mesembrinellinae
- Genus: Mesembrinella
- Species: M. socors

Binomial name
- Mesembrinella socors (Walker, 1861)

Synonyms
- Calliphora socors Walker, 1861; Huascaromusca abaca Hall, 1948; Mesembrinella bicolor Giglio-Tos, 1893

= Mesembrinella socors =

Species of fly

Mesembrinella socors is a species of fly in the family Mesembrinellidae. It is found in Mexico.
