= Celidosphenella diespasmena =

Scientific classification
- Kingdom: Animalia
- Phylum: Arthropoda
- Class: Insecta
- Order: Diptera
- Family: Tephritidae
- Subfamily: Tephritinae
- Tribe: Tephritini
- Genus: Celidosphenella
- Species: C. diespasmena

Binomial name
- Celidosphenella diespasmena (Schiner, 1868)

Synonyms
- Tephritis diespasmena Schiner, 1868; Trypanea birabeni Havrylenko & Winterhalter, 1949; Tripanea diespasmenea Aczél, 1950; Trupanea diespasmanea Aczél, 1950

Species of fly

Celidosphenella diespasmena is a species of tephritid or fruit flies in the genus Celidosphenella of the family Tephritidae.

== Distribution ==
Chile, Argentina.
