= Celidosphenella stonei =

Scientific classification
- Kingdom: Animalia
- Phylum: Arthropoda
- Class: Insecta
- Order: Diptera
- Family: Tephritidae
- Subfamily: Tephritinae
- Tribe: Tephritini
- Genus: Celidosphenella
- Species: C. stonei

Binomial name
- Celidosphenella stonei Stuardo Ortiz, 1946

Synonyms
- Trupanea stonei Stuardo Ortiz, 1946; Trypanea diversa Malloch, 1933

Species of fly

Celidosphenella stonei is a species of tephritid or fruit flies in the genus Celidosphenella of the family Tephritidae.

== Distribution ==
Argentina, Chile.
