= Homoneura incerta =

Scientific classification
- Domain: Eukaryota
- Kingdom: Animalia
- Phylum: Arthropoda
- Class: Insecta
- Order: Diptera
- Family: Lauxaniidae
- Genus: Homoneura
- Species: H. incerta

Binomial name
- Homoneura incerta (Malloch, 1914)

Synonyms
- Sapromyza incerta Malloch, 1914

Species of fly

Homoneura incerta is a species of fly in the family Lauxaniidae.
