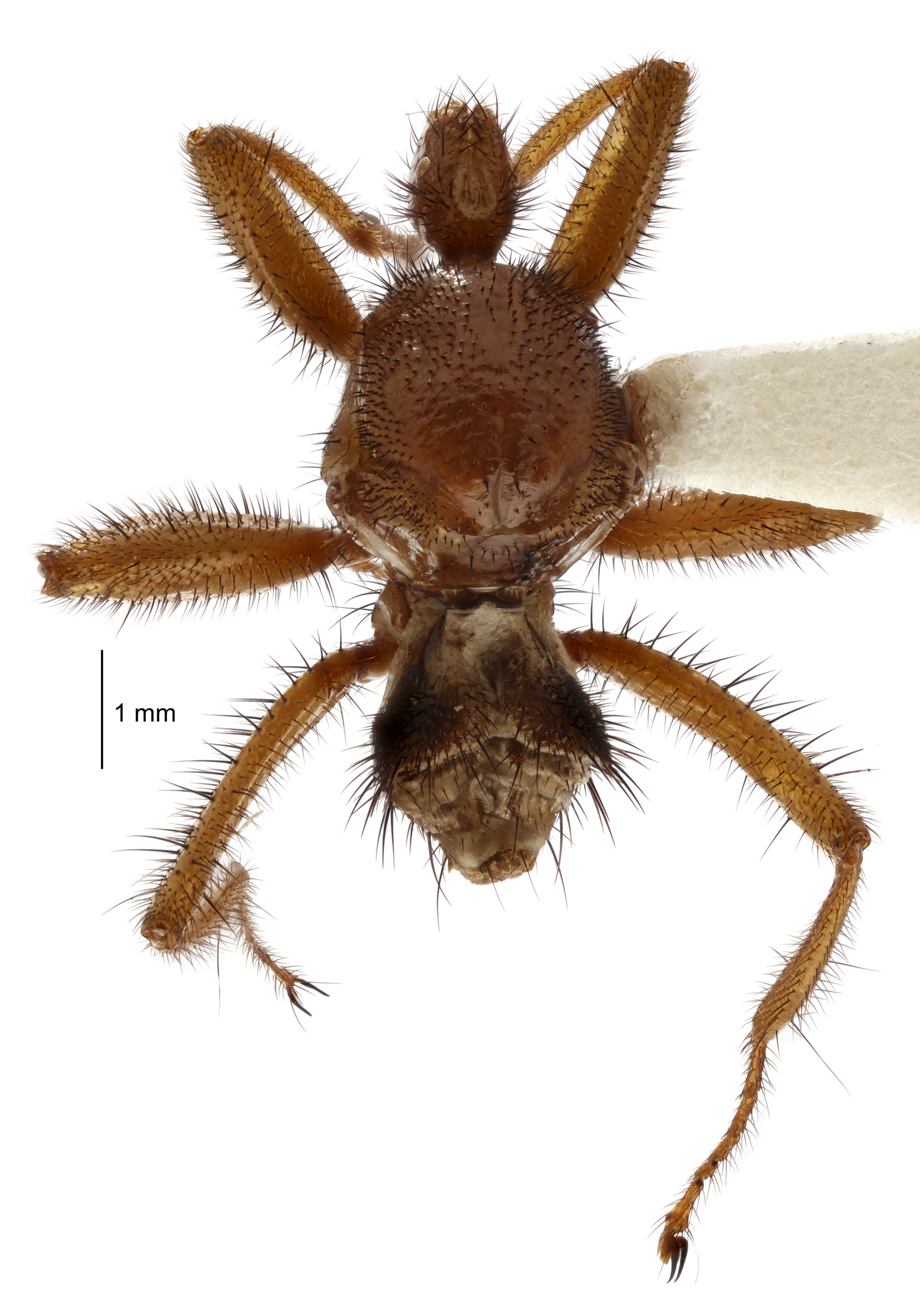
- Mystacinobia zelandica holotype NZAC04019196 (male), dorsal view
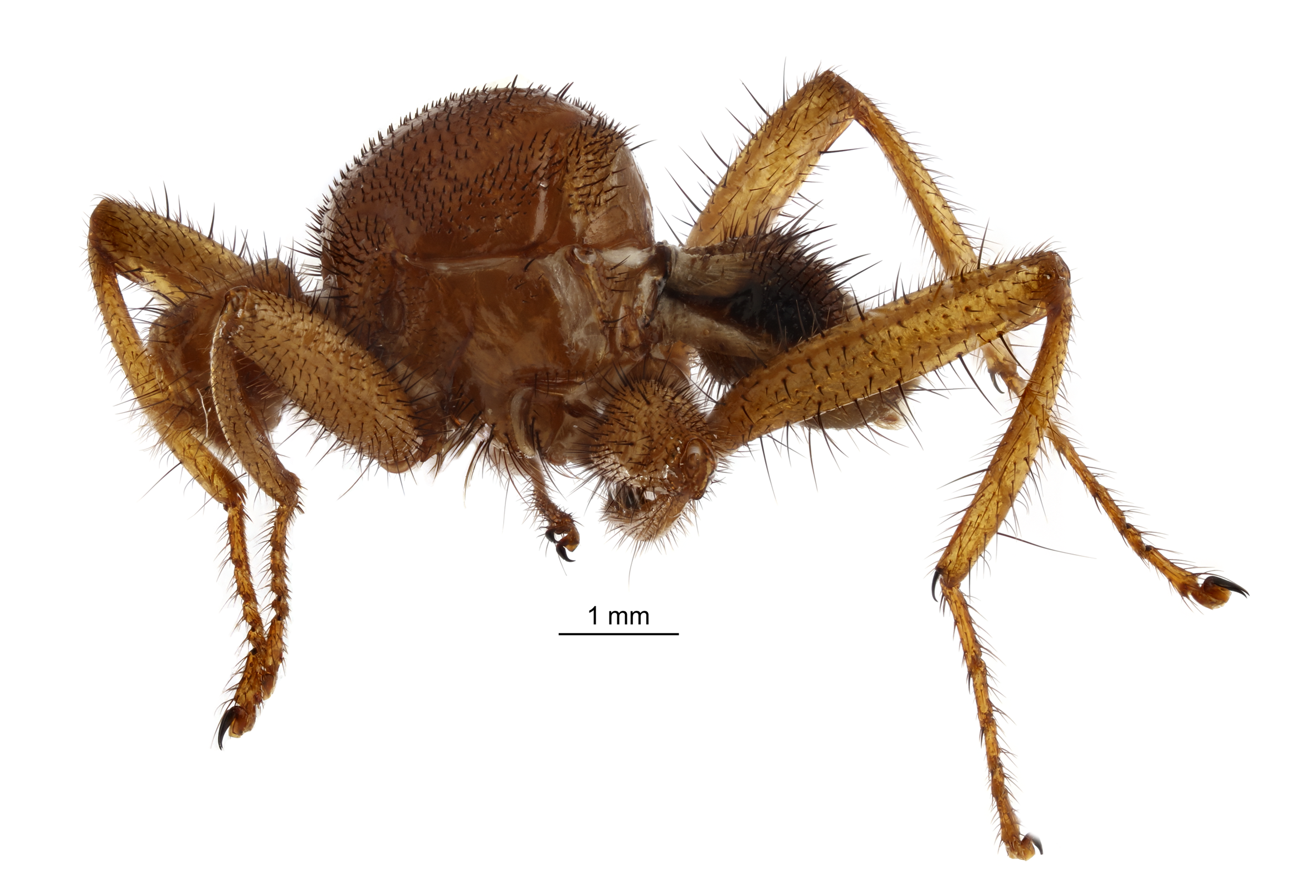
- Lateral view

Conservation status
- Declining (NZ TCS)

Scientific classification
- Kingdom: Animalia
- Phylum: Arthropoda
- Clade: Pancrustacea
- Class: Insecta
- Order: Diptera
- Subsection: Calyptratae
- Superfamily: Oestroidea
- Family: Mystacinobiidae
- Genus: Mystacinobia
- Species: M. zelandica

Binomial name
- Mystacinobia zelandica Holloway, 1976

= New Zealand bat fly =

Species of fly

The New Zealand bat fly (Mystacinobia zelandica) is a small, wingless insect which lives in a commensal relationship with the New Zealand lesser short-tailed bat. It is a true fly, in the order Diptera, placed in its own genus, Mystacinobia, and its own family, Mystacinobiidae. Although many other species of bat fly exist throughout the world, the New Zealand bat fly is endemic to the islands of New Zealand. Unlike other similar looking bat flies, this species is not a parasite and is only phoretic, feeding on bat guano. It appears to be the only insect, parasitic or otherwise, which lives with these bats (fleas, for example, which are common on many other species of bat, are unknown on the short-tailed bat).

== Description ==
New Zealand bat flies are approximately 4–9 mm long, wingless in both sexes, blind, and have long, bristly, spider-like legs which end in specially adapted claws which are thought to help them "swim" through bat fur. Males are larger than females and look quite different; one Japanese expert when sent some of the first specimens collected for scientific study suggested that they were different species.

=== Discovery ===
Mystacinobia was first discovered in 1958, and the first specimen was catalogued for analysis by zoologist P. D. Dwyer in 1962 after it dropped out of the fur of a short-tailed bat he was looking after. In 1973 a 56 metre high kauri tree in the Omahuta Kauri Sanctuary in Northland containing a large colony of short tailed bats collapsed. When inspected the following day a dead bat with three bat flies on it was found by a New Zealand Forest Service officer, who sent the insects to Auckland to be studied. The opportunity to study live bat flies and learn about their behaviour and ecology was lost when the bats deserted their felled roost before a team of scientists from the DSIR was assembled to investigate. Two years later, on 14 March 1975, the kauri tree the bats had moved into was blown over, as Cyclone Allison swept through Northland. This time entomologists were able to collect a large number of bat flies for anatomical studies and to keep in captivity so that their behaviour could be studied and scientifically described and named.

=== Ecology ===
Unlike other bat fly such as those in the Hippoboscidae, the New Zealand bat fly is not dependent on the blood of the bats with which it lives, instead feeding on guano. It lives in colonies and the females lay their eggs in large shared nurseries of eggs and larvae, which require temperatures of over 30 °C to develop. The adult females will groom the larvae in the nurseries as well as each other and their other colony mates.

There also seems to be the beginning of a caste system, as some of the males live past their normal reproductive age and act as a "soldier caste" of colony guards. These elderly males produce a high frequency buzz that seems to keep the bats from flying too close to the fly colony. As this species of bat is also an insect-eater, the flies would appear to be under constant threat of being eaten by their "hosts". The vibrations of these elderly males appears to be the mechanism by which the fly prevents itself from becoming prey.

To travel to other colonies, bat flies need to ride on their hosts; up to 10 flies can be found on the fur of a single bat when it leaves its roost.

== Taxonomy and naming ==
Entomologist Beverly Holloway named and described the bat fly as the sole member of its family (Mystacinobiidae) and genus (Mystacinobia), making both of these monotypic. Subsequent DNA analysis suggests that New Zealand bat flies represent a distinct and ancient lineage in the superfamily Oestroidea, which includes flesh flies and blow flies. The ancestors of their host species (Icarops, a Miocene bat which lived 20 million years ago) also lived in Australia, but it is not known whether the New Zealand bat fly evolved there or in New Zealand – it could have been transported across the Tasman Sea with its host, or arrived via a forested Antarctica. The holotype specimen is held by the New Zealand Arthropod Collection, in Auckland, New Zealand.

The species is considered to be a sister of the Ulurumyia macalpinei that breeds in dung and is known as "McAlpine's fly" which is placed in another monotypic family.

Images of the New Zealand bat fly
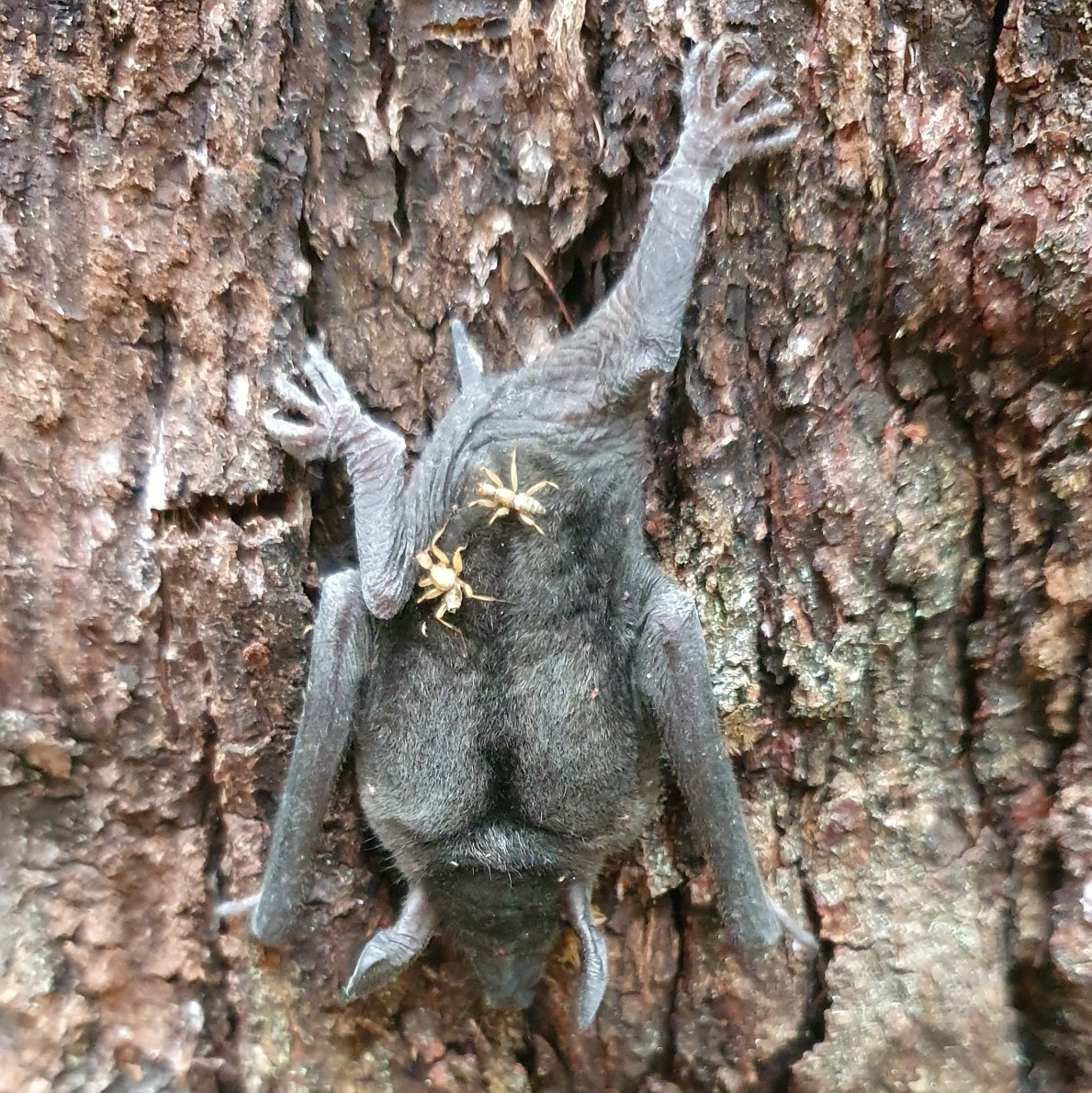
New Zealand bat flies (Mystacinobia zelandica) on a juvenile short-tailed bat (Mystacina tuberculata) in Fiordland

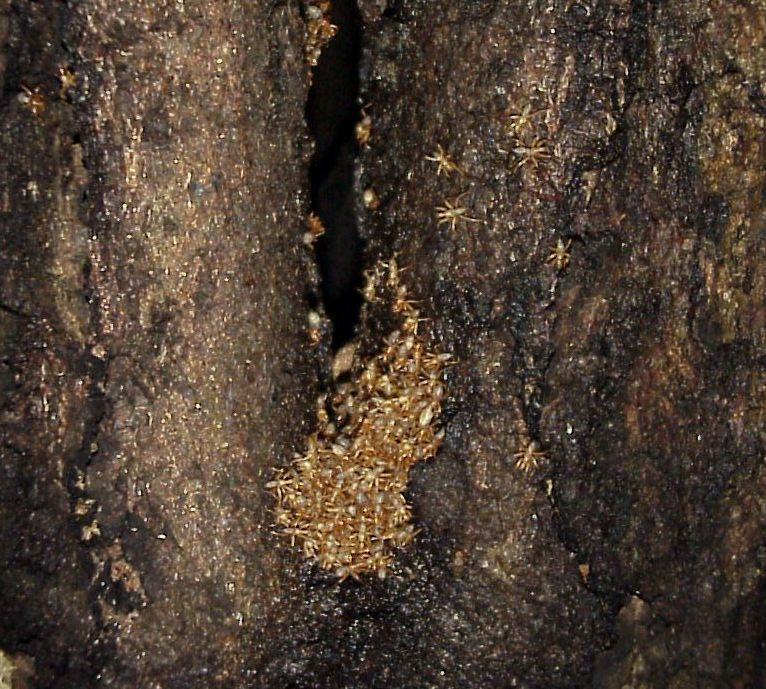
New Zealand bat flies at the entrance of a short-tailed bat roost in Fiordland

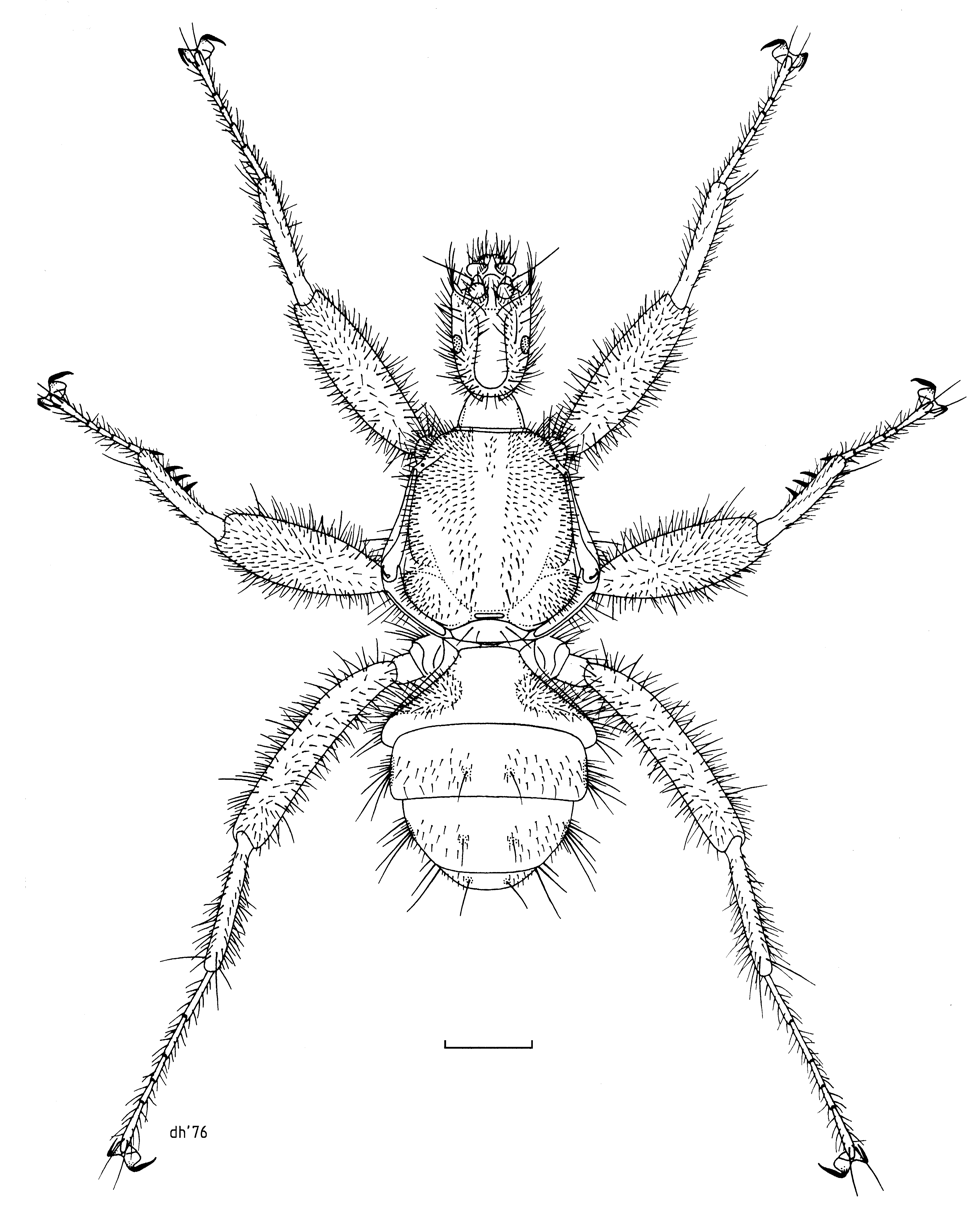
Mystacinobia zelandica illustration by Des Helmore

== Conservation status ==
Under the New Zealand Threat Classification System, this species is listed as "Declining" with the qualifiers of "Conservation Dependent" and "Range Restricted".
