= Celidosphenella poecila =

Scientific classification
- Kingdom: Animalia
- Phylum: Arthropoda
- Class: Insecta
- Order: Diptera
- Family: Tephritidae
- Subfamily: Tephritinae
- Tribe: Tephritini
- Genus: Celidosphenella
- Species: C. poecila

Binomial name
- Celidosphenella poecila (Schiner, 1868)

Synonyms
- Sphenella poecila Schiner, 1868; Celidosphenella poecilla Stuardo Ortiz, 1946

Species of fly

Celidosphenella poecila is a species of tephritid or fruit flies in the genus Celidosphenella of the family Tephritidae.

== Distribution ==
Chile.
