= Celidosphenella vidua =

Scientific classification
- Kingdom: Animalia
- Phylum: Arthropoda
- Class: Insecta
- Order: Diptera
- Family: Tephritidae
- Subfamily: Tephritinae
- Tribe: Tephritini
- Genus: Celidosphenella
- Species: C. vidua

Binomial name
- Celidosphenella vidua (Hering, 1942)

Synonyms
- Trypanea vidua Hering, 1942

Species of fly

Celidosphenella vidua is a species of tephritid or fruit flies in the genus Celidosphenella of the family Tephritidae.

== Distribution ==
Chile.
