= Homoneura occidentalis =

Scientific classification
- Domain: Eukaryota
- Kingdom: Animalia
- Phylum: Arthropoda
- Class: Insecta
- Order: Diptera
- Family: Lauxaniidae
- Genus: Homoneura
- Species: H. occidentalis

Binomial name
- Homoneura occidentalis (Malloch, 1920)

Synonyms
- Sapromyza occidentalis Malloch, 1920; Sapromyzosoma nudifemur Malloch and Mcatee, 1924

Species of fly

Homoneura occidentalis is a species of fly in the family Lauxaniidae.
