= Laneella nigripes =

Scientific classification
- Kingdom: Animalia
- Phylum: Arthropoda
- Class: Insecta
- Order: Diptera
- Family: Mesembrinellidae
- Subfamily: Laneellinae
- Genus: Laneella
- Species: L. nigripes

Binomial name
- Laneella nigripes Guimarães, 1977

Species of fly

Laneella nigripes is a species of fly in the family Mesembrinellidae. It is found in Brazil.
