= Homoneura houghii =

Scientific classification
- Domain: Eukaryota
- Kingdom: Animalia
- Phylum: Arthropoda
- Class: Insecta
- Order: Diptera
- Family: Lauxaniidae
- Genus: Homoneura
- Species: H. houghii

Binomial name
- Homoneura houghii (Coquillett, 1898)

Synonyms
- Sapromyza houghii Coquillett, 1898

Species of fly

Homoneura houghii is a species of fly in the family Lauxaniidae.
