= Pseudonapomyza atra =

Scientific classification
- Kingdom: Animalia
- Phylum: Arthropoda
- Class: Insecta
- Order: Diptera
- Family: Agromyzidae
- Subfamily: Phytomyzinae
- Genus: Pseudonapomyza
- Species: P. atra

Binomial name
- Pseudonapomyza atra (Meigen, 1830)

Synonyms
- Napomyza atrata Malloch, 1914; Napomyza hindustanica Garg, 1971; Phytagromyza keralaensis Tandon, 1966; Phytagromyza sabarii Singh & Ipe, 1973; Phytagromyza tibialis Sasakawa, 1963; Phytomyza acuticornis Loew, 1858; Phytomyza atra Meigen, 1830; Phytomyza morio Zetterstedt, 1848; Phytomyza nitidula Malloch, 1913; Pseudonapomyza stanionyteae Pakalniškis, 1992

Species of fly

Pseudonapomyza atra is a species of fly in the family Agromyzidae.

== Distribution ==
Canada, United States.
