= Pseudonapomyza atrata =

Scientific classification
- Kingdom: Animalia
- Phylum: Arthropoda
- Class: Insecta
- Order: Diptera
- Family: Agromyzidae
- Subfamily: Phytomyzinae
- Genus: Pseudonapomyza
- Species: P. atrata

Binomial name
- Pseudonapomyza atrata (Malloch, 1914)

Synonyms
- Napomyza atrata Malloch, 1914; Phytagromyza keralaensis Tandon, 1966; Phytagromyza sabarii Singh & Ipe, 1973; Phytagromyza tibialis Sasakawa, 1963

Species of fly

Pseudonapomyza atrata is a species of fly in the family Agromyzidae.

== Distribution ==
Taiwan, India, Sumbawa, Vietnam.
