= Homoneura americana =

Scientific classification
- Domain: Eukaryota
- Kingdom: Animalia
- Phylum: Arthropoda
- Class: Insecta
- Order: Diptera
- Family: Lauxaniidae
- Genus: Homoneura
- Species: H. americana

Binomial name
- Homoneura americana (Wiedemann, 1830)

Synonyms
- Sapromyza americana Wiedemann, 1830; Sapromyza compedita Loew, 1861

Species of fly

Homoneura americana is a species of fly in the family Lauxaniidae.
