= Celidosphenella bella =

Scientific classification
- Kingdom: Animalia
- Phylum: Arthropoda
- Class: Insecta
- Order: Diptera
- Family: Tephritidae
- Subfamily: Tephritinae
- Tribe: Tephritini
- Genus: Celidosphenella
- Species: C. bella

Binomial name
- Celidosphenella bella (Blanchard, 1854)

Synonyms
- Acinia bella Blanchard, 1854

Species of fly

Celidosphenella bella is a species of tephritid or fruit flies in the genus Celidosphenella of the family Tephritidae.

== Distribution ==
Chile.
