= Souzalopesiella =

Scientific classification
- Kingdom: Animalia
- Phylum: Arthropoda
- Class: Insecta
- Order: Diptera
- Family: Mesembrinellidae
- Genus: Souzalopesiella; Guimarães, 1977
- Species: S. facialis

Binomial name
- Souzalopesiella facialis Aldrich, 1922

Genus of flies

Souzalopesiella is a genus of flies in the family Mesembrinellidae. It is found in Belize, Guatemala, and Panama. Its only member species is Souzalopesiella facialis.
