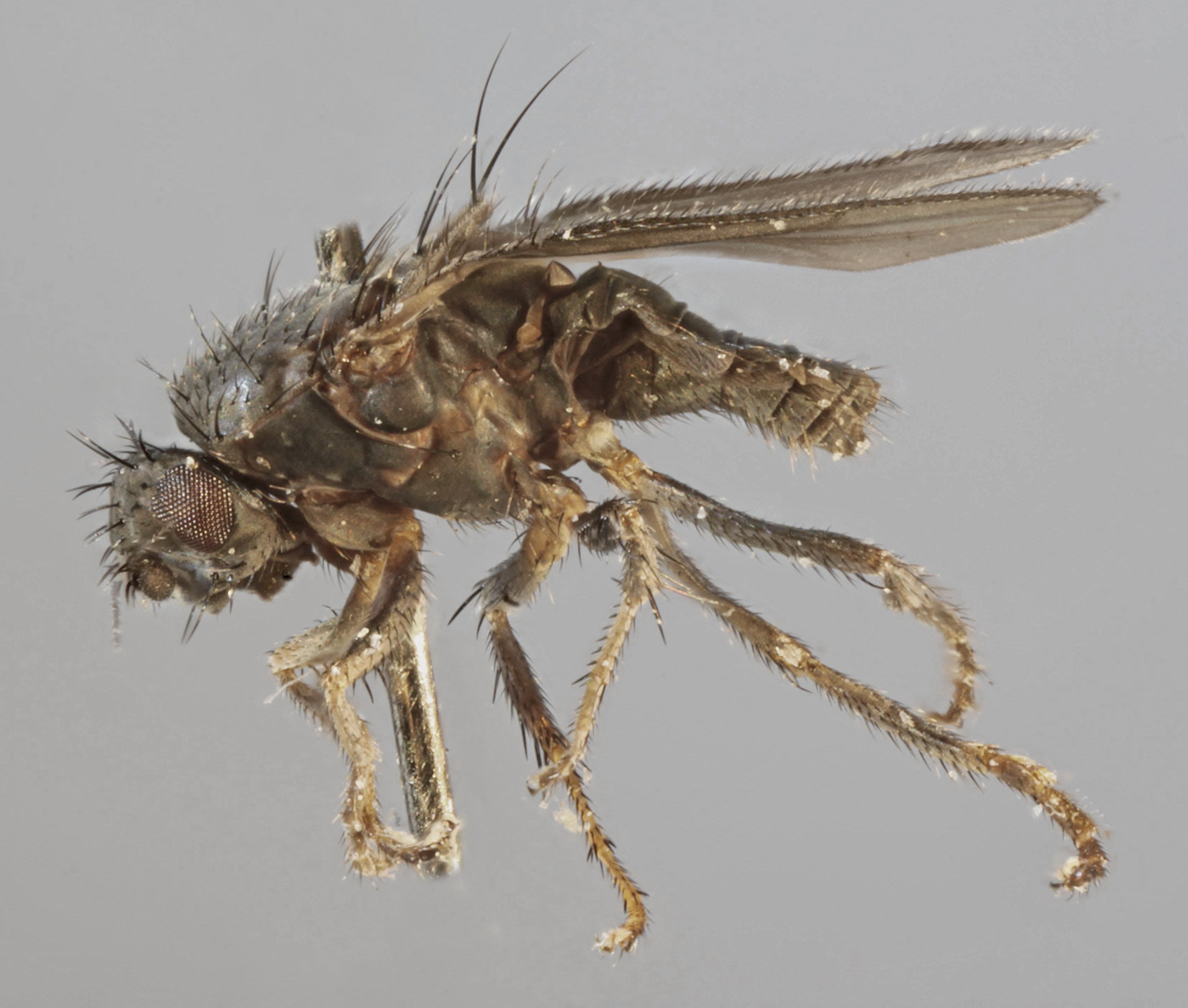
- Thoracochaeta zosterae North Wales

Scientific classification
- Kingdom: Animalia
- Phylum: Arthropoda
- Class: Insecta
- Order: Diptera
- Family: Sphaeroceridae
- Genus: Thoracochaeta
- Species: T. zosterae

Binomial name
- Thoracochaeta zosterae Haliday, 1833

= Thoracochaeta zosterae =

Species of fly

Thoracochaeta zosterae is a species of fly in the family Sphaeroceridae, the lesser dung flies. It is found in the Palearctic. Thoracochaeta zosterae is a typical inhabitant of sea coasts. The larvae live in seaweed.
