= Mesembrinella aeneiventris =

Scientific classification
- Kingdom: Animalia
- Phylum: Arthropoda
- Class: Insecta
- Order: Diptera
- Family: Mesembrinellidae
- Genus: Mesembrinella
- Species: M. aeneiventris

Binomial name
- Mesembrinella aeneiventris (Wiedemann, 1830)

Synonyms
- Dexia aeneiventris Wiedemann, 1830; Huascaromusca cruciata Townsend, 1918; Mesembrinella tibialis Aldrich, 1922

Species of fly

Mesembrinella aeneiventris is a species of fly in the family Mesembrinellidae. It is found in Panama, Colombia, Peru, and Brazil.
