= Laneella fusconitida =

Scientific classification
- Kingdom: Animalia
- Phylum: Arthropoda
- Class: Insecta
- Order: Diptera
- Family: Mesembrinellidae
- Subfamily: Laneellinae
- Genus: Laneella
- Species: L. fusconitida

Binomial name
- Laneella fusconitida Whitworth, 2019

Species of fly

Laneella fusconitida is a species of fly in the family Mesembrinellidae.

== Distribution ==
The species can be found in Costa Rica.
