= Homoneura fuscibasis =

Scientific classification
- Domain: Eukaryota
- Kingdom: Animalia
- Phylum: Arthropoda
- Class: Insecta
- Order: Diptera
- Family: Lauxaniidae
- Genus: Homoneura
- Species: H. fuscibasis

Binomial name
- Homoneura fuscibasis (Malloch, 1920)

Synonyms
- Sapromyza fuscibasis Malloch, 1920

Species of fly

Homoneura fuscibasis is a species of fly in the family Lauxaniidae.
