= Mesembrinella spicata =

Scientific classification
- Kingdom: Animalia
- Phylum: Arthropoda
- Class: Insecta
- Order: Diptera
- Family: Mesembrinellidae
- Subfamily: Mesembrinellinae
- Genus: Mesembrinella
- Species: M. spicata

Binomial name
- Mesembrinella spicata Aldrich, 1925

Species of fly

Mesembrinella spicata is a species of fly in the family Mesembrinellidae.

== Distribution ==
Costa Rica.
