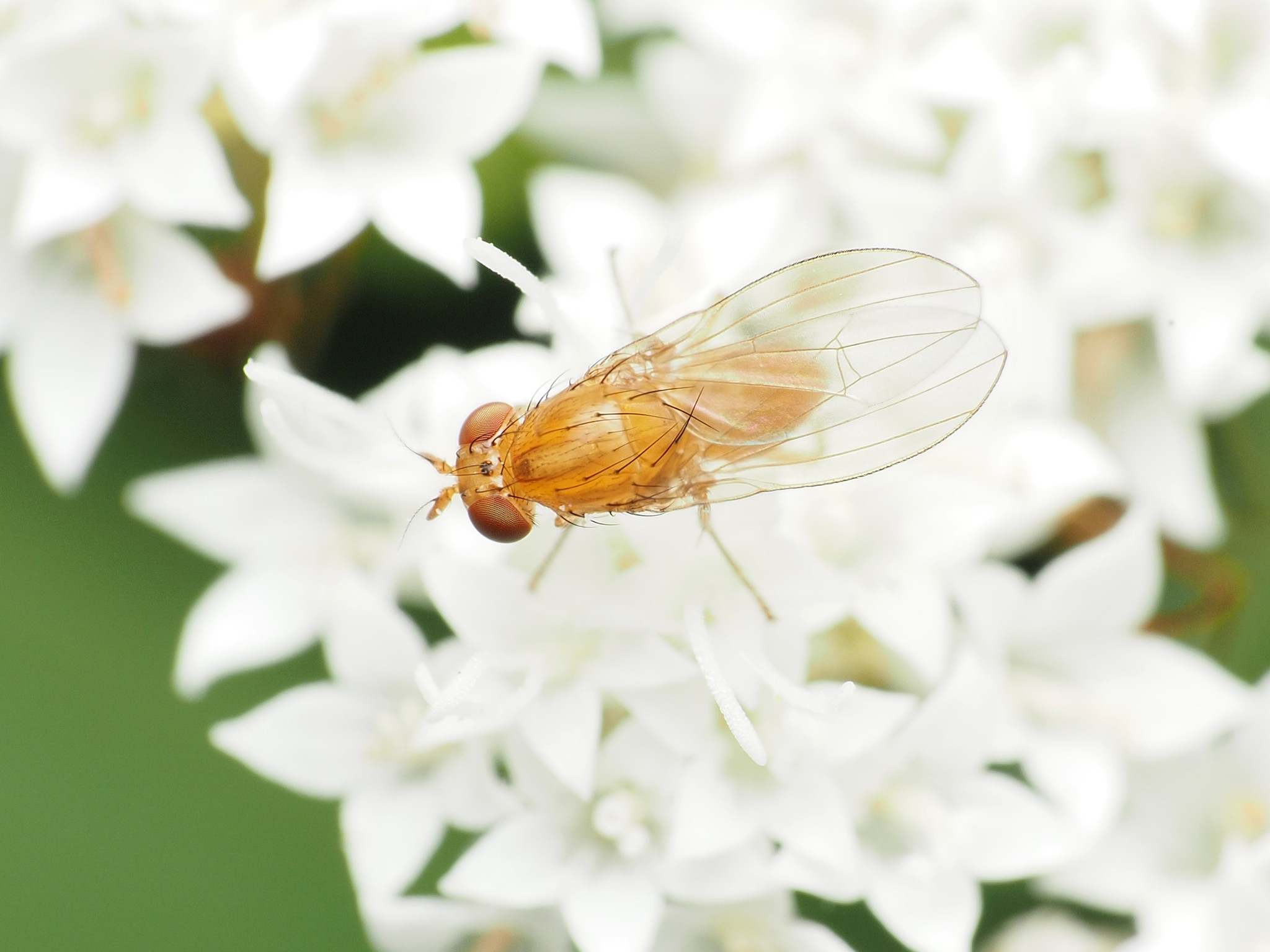

Scientific classification
- Domain: Eukaryota
- Kingdom: Animalia
- Phylum: Arthropoda
- Class: Insecta
- Order: Diptera
- Family: Lauxaniidae
- Genus: Homoneura
- Species: H. unguiculata

Binomial name
- Homoneura unguiculata (Kertész, 1913)

Synonyms
- Lauxania unguiculata Kertész, 1913

= Homoneura unguiculata =

Species of fly

Homoneura unguiculata is a species of fly in the family Lauxaniidae.
