= Laneella perisi =

Scientific classification
- Kingdom: Animalia
- Phylum: Arthropoda
- Class: Insecta
- Order: Diptera
- Family: Mesembrinellidae
- Subfamily: Laneellinae
- Genus: Laneella
- Species: L. perisi

Binomial name
- Laneella perisi (Mariluis, 1987)

Synonyms
- Mesembrinella perisi Mariluis, 1987

Species of fly

Laneella perisi is a species of fly in the family Mesembrinellidae. It is found in Ecuador.
