= Ulurumyia =

Scientific classification
- Kingdom: Animalia
- Phylum: Arthropoda
- Clade: Pancrustacea
- Class: Insecta
- Order: Diptera
- Superfamily: Oestroidea
- Family: Ulurumyiidae; Michelsen and Pape, 2017
- Genus: Ulurumyia; Michelsen and Pape, 2017
- Species: U. macalpinei

Binomial name
- Ulurumyia macalpinei Michelsen and Pape, 2017

Species of fly

Ulurumyia macalpinei is a species of fly in the superfamily Oestroidea endemic to Australia. It is the only species of genus Ulurumyia, which in turn is the only genus of family Ulurumyiidae, making the latter two taxa monotypic. It was first discovered in the 1970s, but was not described until 2017, and in the intervening decades was informally known to entomologists as McAlpine's fly. It breeds in dung and is said to be clearly distinct from other oestroid families but its exact position within the superfamily has not been determined with certainty. The genus name Ulurumyia is derived from the Australian monolith Uluru (also known as Ayers Rock) and from myia, the Greek word for fly; the species name macalpinei commemorates the Australian dipterist David K. McAlpine, the first person to collect specimens of this fly and realize their evolutionary distinctiveness.

It has been suggested that the species is sister of the New Zealand bat fly, which is placed in the family Mystacinobiidae.
