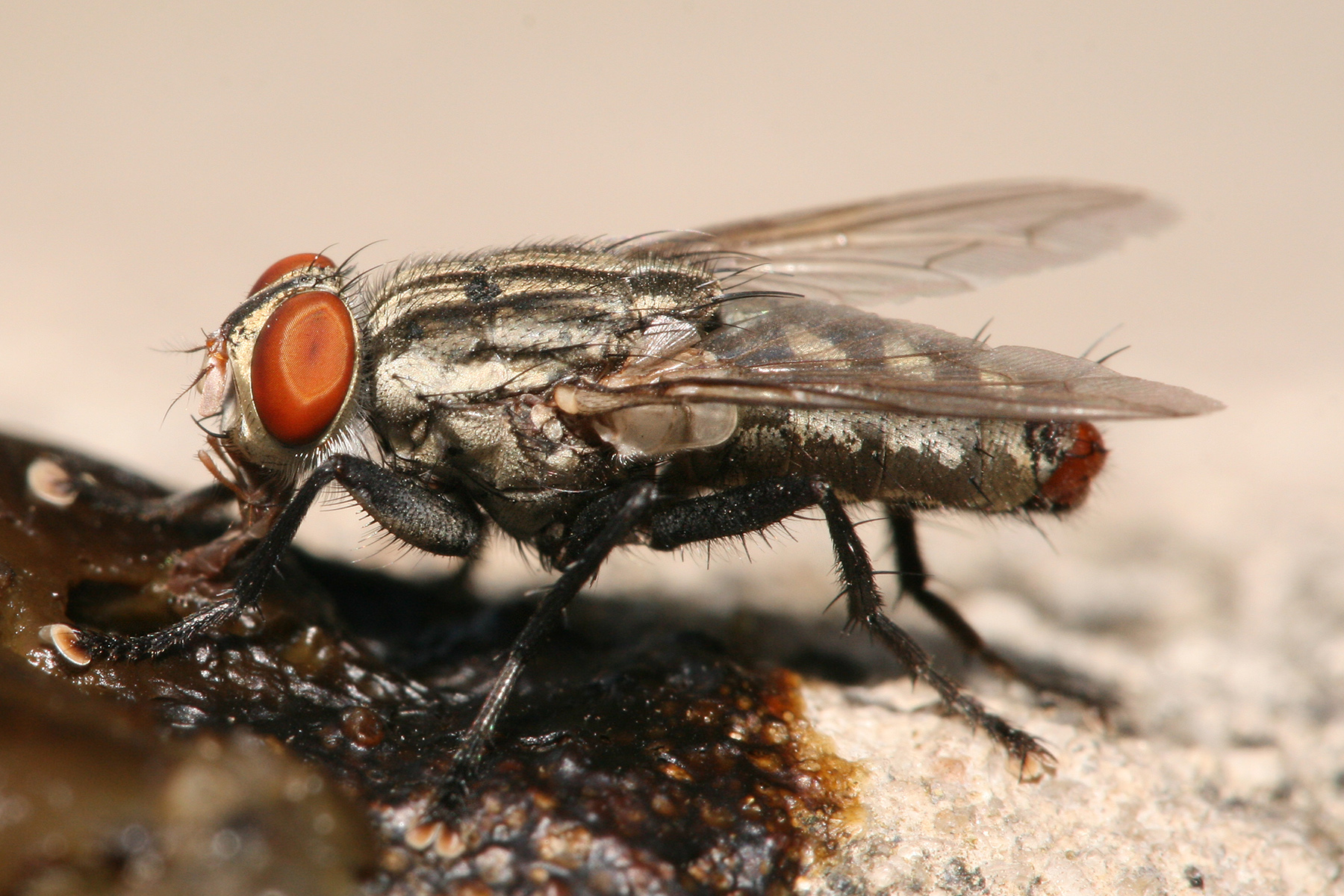
- Sarcophaga bercaea (Sarcophagidae)

Scientific classification
- Kingdom: Animalia
- Phylum: Arthropoda
- Clade: Pancrustacea
- Class: Insecta
- Order: Diptera
- Clade: Eremoneura
- Clade: Cyclorrhapha
- Section: Schizophora
- Subsection: Calyptratae
- Superfamily: Oestroidea

Families
- see text

= Oestroidea =

Superfamily of flies

Oestroidea is a superfamily of Calyptratae that includes the blow flies, bot flies, flesh flies, and their relatives. It occurs worldwide and has about 15,000 described species.

== Evolution and phylogeny ==
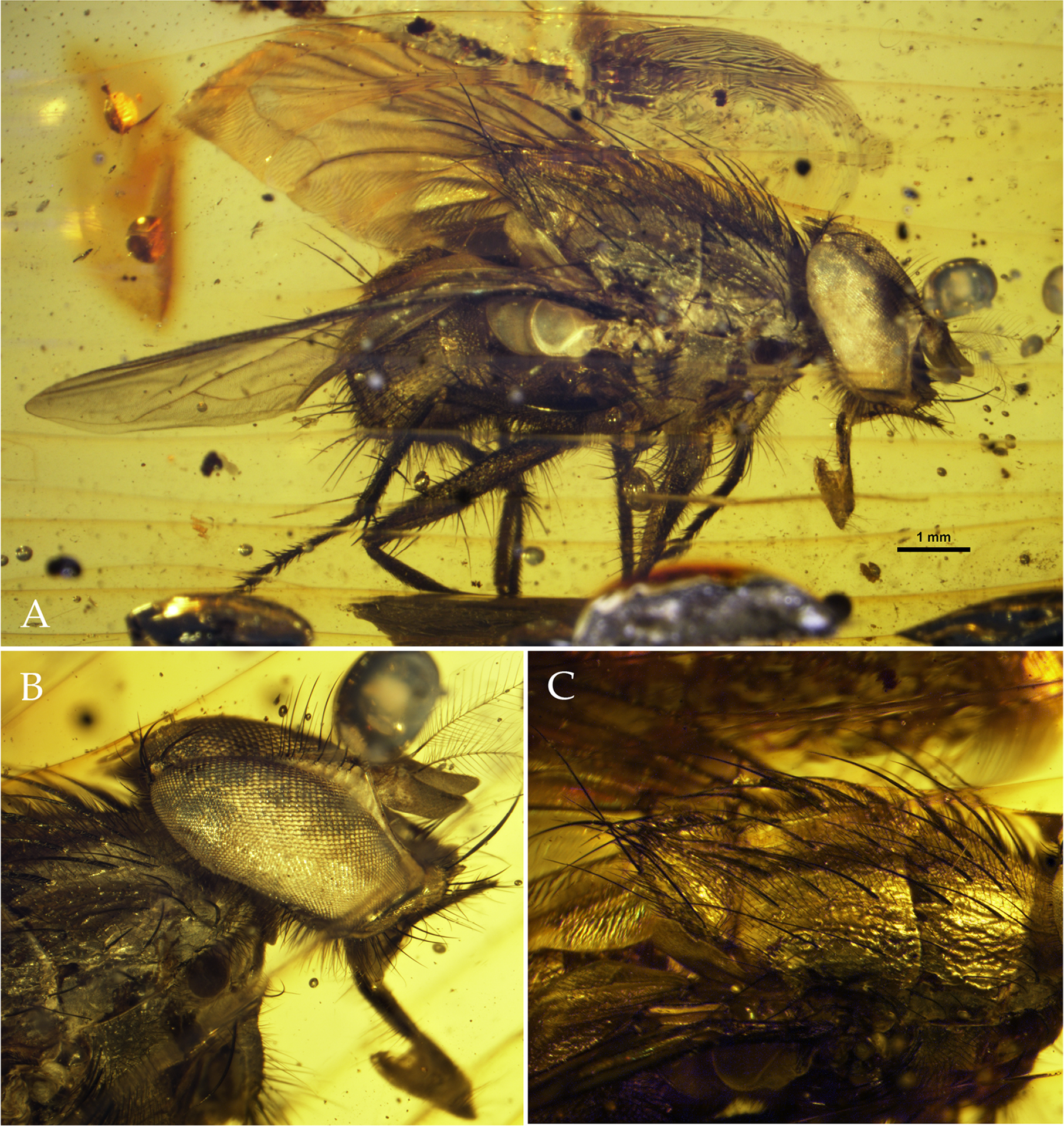
Mesembrinella caenozoica holotype male, fossil in Dominican amber

The earliest known fossil of Oestroidea is of a Mesembrinellidae found in Dominican amber from the Miocene. The Oestroidea in general are believed to have originated 48.2 million years ago.

The superfamily includes the families:

- Calliphoridae
- Mesembrinellidae (formerly included in Calliphoridae)
- Mystacinobiidae
- Oestridae
- Polleniidae (formerly included in Calliphoridae)
- Rhiniidae (formerly included in Calliphoridae)
- Sarcophagidae
- Tachinidae
- Ulurumyiidae

Historically, Oestroidea was considered the sister group to Muscoidea. A 2012 molecular analysis placed Oestroidea within a paraphyletic Muscoidea, and also confirmed the monophyly of Oestroidea and of most of its families (except Calliphoridae). Morphological and molecular analyses in 2017 yielded overall similar results. Relationships among the families and subfamilies within Oestroidea are complicated and not well resolved.

== Ecology ==
Oestroidea have a wide range of feeding habits and breeding environments: saprophagous (many Calliphoridae and Sarcophagidae), feeding on blood of birds or mammals (some Calliphoridae), parasites of gastropods or earthworms (some Calliphoridae), parasitoids of arthropods (Rhinophoridae, Tachinidae and some Sarcophagidae), living in association with termites or ants (some Calliphoridae and Rhiniidae), and commensals of bats (Mystacinobiidae). Various species of Calliphoridae, Oestridae and Sarcophagidae have larvae that parasitise vertebrates, causing myiasis.

== Forensic entomology ==
Many species of Oestroidea are of forensic importance due to feeding on decomposing animals, including humans.
