= Jacques Surcouf =

French entomologist

Jacques M R Surcouf (1873–1934) was a French entomologist. He held the title of baron and may have been of corsair descent (see Robert Surcouf).

From at least 1906–1911, he was head of zoology at the colonial laboratory of the Paris National Museum of Natural History.

He published a number of notable studies, largely on the subject of flies. In 1909 he published a description of four new species of horse-fly (Tabanidae) from India and Assam with Gertrude Ricardo, a scientist from the British Museum. In 1911 he published a noted study of South American Diptera (flies) with R. Gonzales-Rincones.

Surcouf was a difficult person to work with and clashed with his peers, particularly, for example, Eugene Seguy.

In 1920 he distinguished the genus Caiusa from Phumosia in the family Calliphoridae based on flies he discovered in southern India and in Australia.

He was a member of the Société entomologique de France starting in 1905, and the president of the Société entomologique de France in 1921.
