= Eugène Séguy =

French entomologist and artist

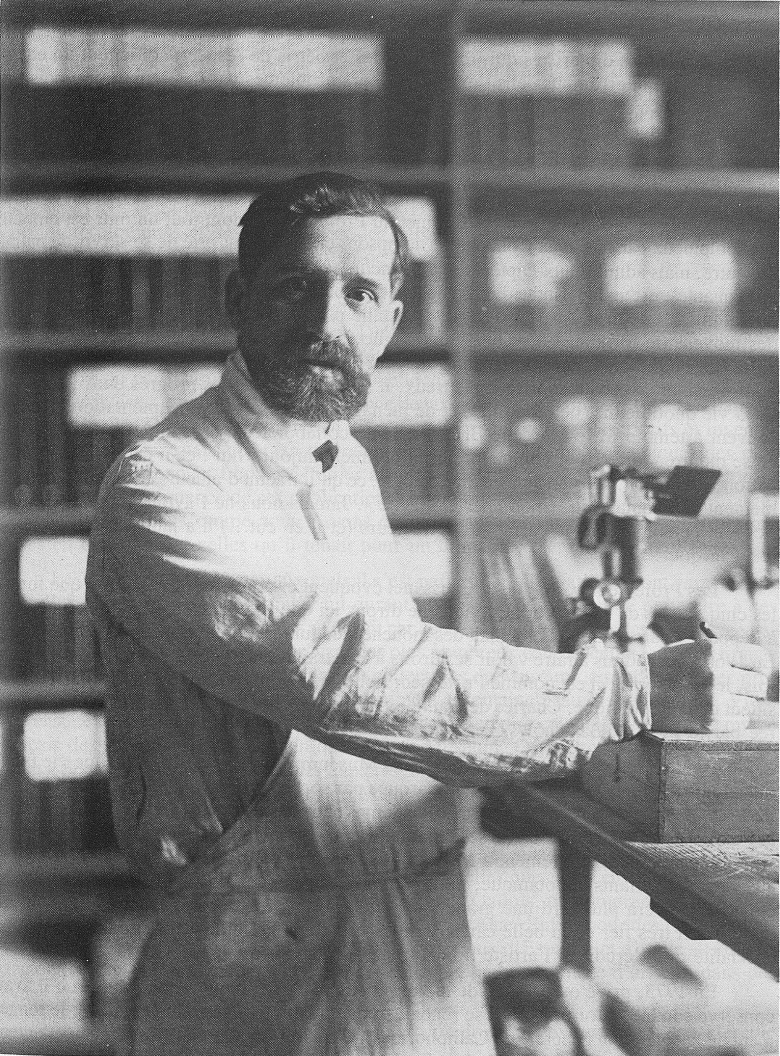
Eugène Séguy (1934)

Eugène Séguy (21 April 1890 – 1 June 1985) was a French entomologist who specialised in studying Diptera. He held a chair of entomology at the Muséum national d'histoire naturelle in Paris from 1956 to 1960. He is also known for establishing the Diptera section at that museum. This entomologist is often confused with a French artist with a similar name: Émile-Allain Séguyfr:Émile-Allain Séguy (1877–1951), who is known for his pochoir artworks representing plants.

== Biography ==
Eugène Séguy was born in Paris in 1890. Séguy joined the Muséum national d'histoire naturelle in 1919. Over the course of his career, he published over 600 scientific works, focusing primarily on the taxonomy and biology of flies. He was also a skilled scientific illustrator, known for his ability to combine aesthetic quality with anatomical precision in his plates.

== Work ==
- Diptera: recueil d'etudes biologiques et systematiques sur les Diptères du Globe (Collection of biological and systematic studies on Diptera of the World). 11 vols. Text figs. Part of Encyclopedie Entomologique, Serie B II: Diptera. (1924–1953).
- Faune de France. Diptères: Ptychopteridae à Phlebotominae 109 p.,179 figs (1925).
- Faune de France. Diptères Brachycères. Stratiomyidae to Omphralidae 308 p.,685 figs (1926).
- Faune de France. Diptères Brachycères. Asilidae 308 p.,685 figs 190 p.,384 figs (1927).
- Spedizione scientifica all'oasi di Cufra [Marzo-Luglio 1931]. Insectes diptères. Ann. Mus. civ. Stor. nat. Genova 55[1930–1931]: 490–511, figures 1–3 (1932).
- Contributions à l'étude de la faune du Mozambique. Voyage de M.M. Lesne [1928–1929] 13e note. Diptères [2e partie]. Mems. Estud. Mus. zool. Univ. Coimbra 67: 5–80 (1933).
- Étude sur quelques Muscides de l'Amérique Latine. Rev. Soc. ent. Argent. 6: 9–16, 3 figures (1934).
- Séguy, E. Diptera L. Nematocera et Brachycera. Mission Scientifique de l'Omo; Vol. 4. [Zoologie]; Ed.: Jeannel. Mus. Natn. Hist. nat. 8: 319–380 (1938).
- Séguy, E., 1938 La Vie des Mouches et des Moustiques; Delagrave.
- Faune de France. Insectes Ectoparasites 684 p.,957 fig (1944).
- La Biologie des Dipteres. pp. 609. 7 col + 3 b/w plates, 225 text figs. (1950).
- Dictionnaire des termes d’entomologie. Editions P. Lechevalier, Paris (FR)(1967).
