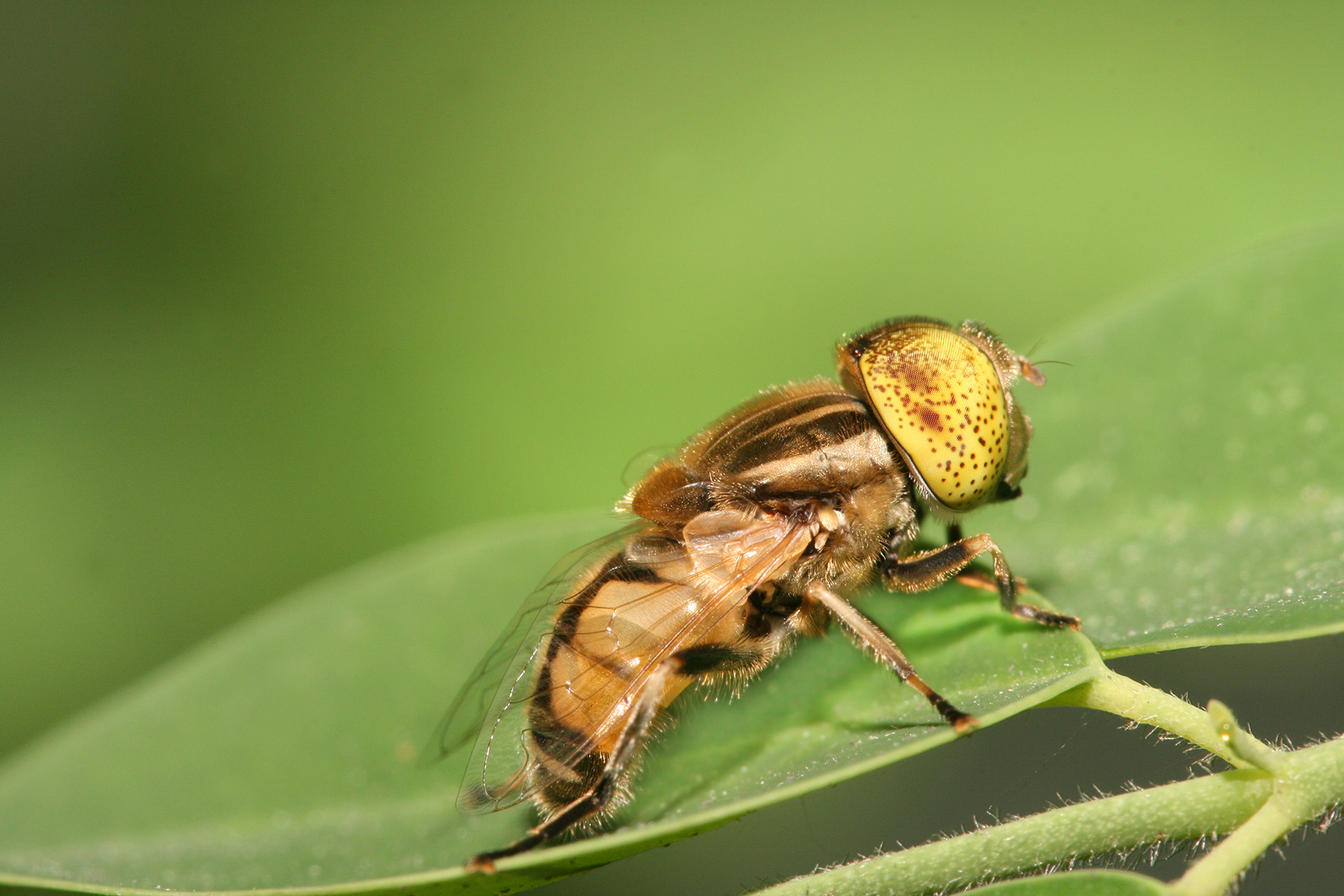

Scientific classification
- Kingdom: Animalia
- Phylum: Arthropoda
- Class: Insecta
- Order: Diptera
- Family: Syrphidae
- Genus: Eristalinus
- Species: E. megacephalus

Binomial name
- Eristalinus megacephalus Rossi, 1794

Synonyms
- Eristalis fasciatus Germar, 1844; Eristalis laetus Wiedemann, 1830; Eristalis obscuritarsis Meijere, 1908; Eristalis pallinevris Macquart, 1842; Eristalis quinquefasciatus Schiner, 1849; Eristalis quinquevittatus Macquart, 1849; Eristalis ridens Walker, 1849; Lathyrophthalmus ishigakiensis Shiraki, 1968

= Eristalinus megacephalus =

Species of fly

Eristalinus megacephalus is a species of hoverfly.

== Description ==
Eristalinus megacephalus has a black abdomen and golden horizontal stripes larger in males. It has a black thorax, legs with black tips, transparent, flexible wings, a large head and golden compound eyes with pale purple spots. Being about 8–11 mm long, it is a good pollinator, and uses Batesian mimicry to look like hymenopteran bees and scare away predators. Its appearance is also similar to bee flies (family Bombyliidae). The species is listed in 2: 63 of Rossi's publication Mantissa insectorum. There are no subspecies. It is the rarest species of the genus Eristalinus, and is common but not abundant.

The species's flight period is from May to October, and is most plentiful from June to July.

== Distribution ==
E. megacephalus can be found in most countries, including South Africa, Egypt, Sri Lanka, China, Taiwan, India, Java, Guam, Southern Spain, Turkey, North Africa, Iran, and coastal parts of Italy.

== Gallery ==
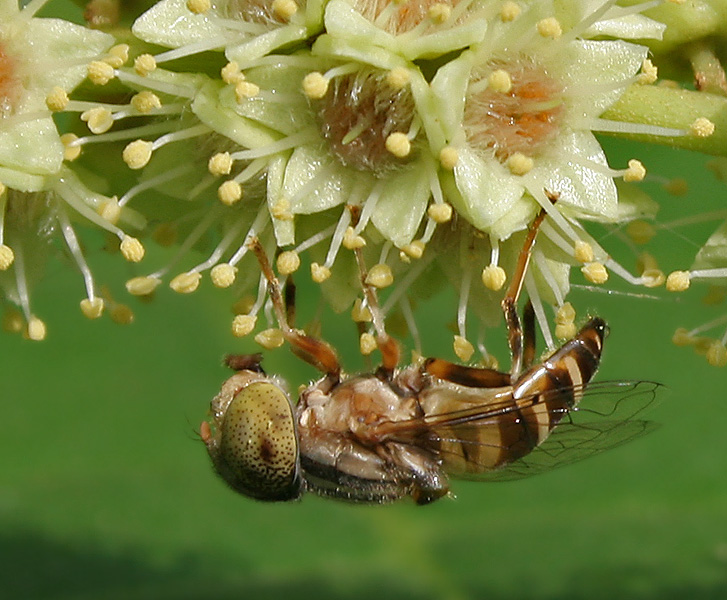
Hoverfly on an Almond flower

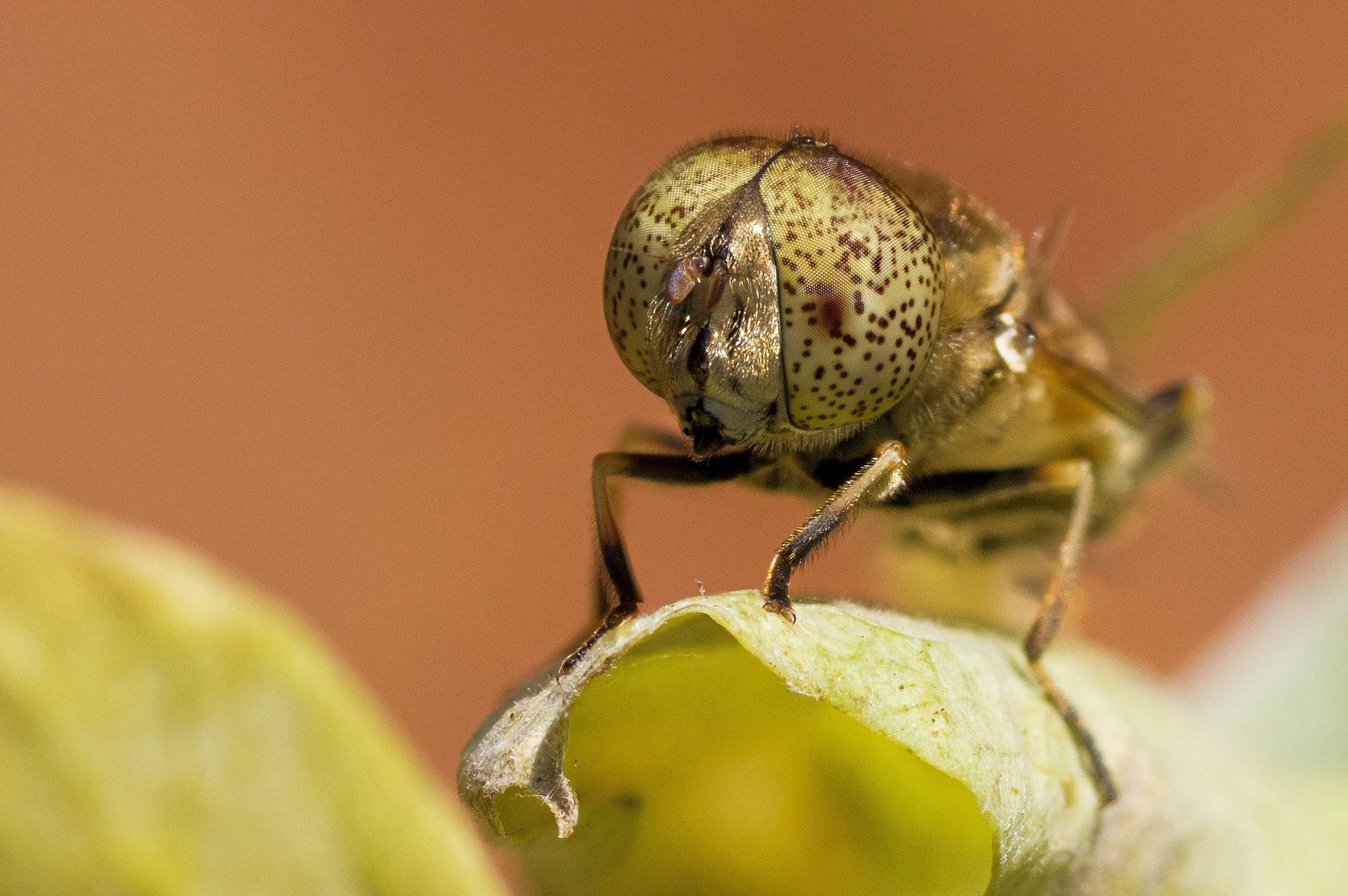
Fly (E. megacephalus)

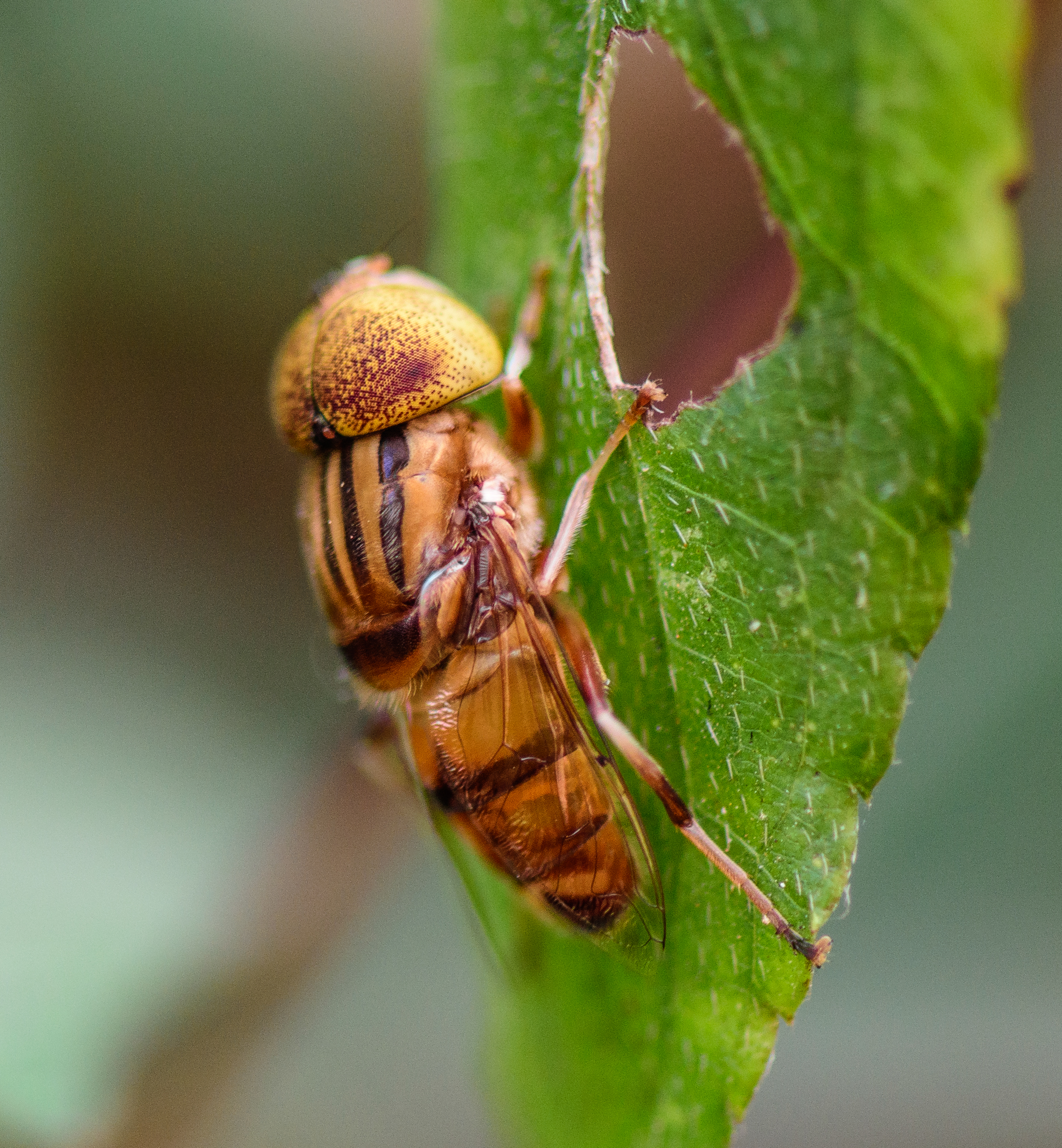
from Kerala, India

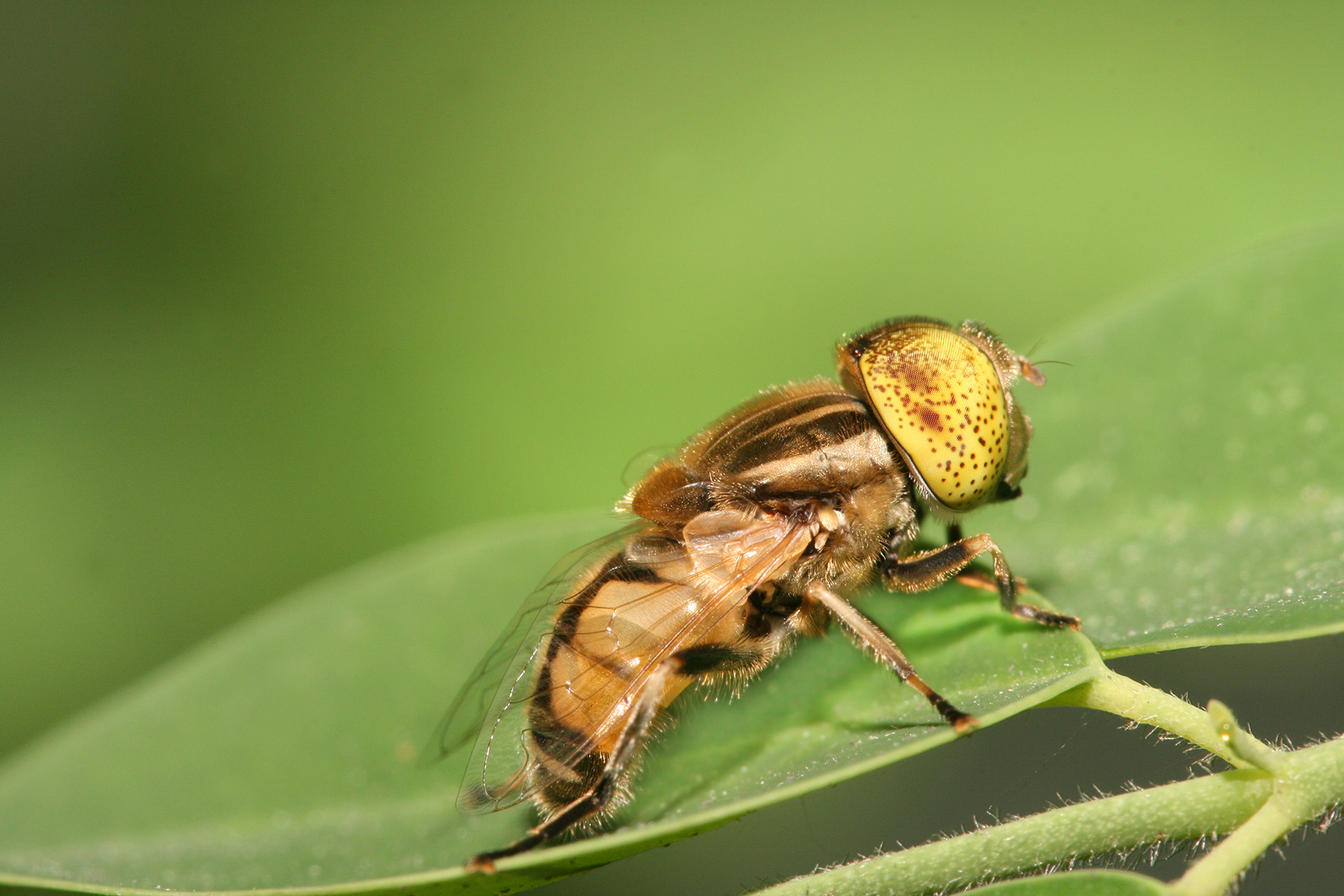

== See also ==
- Eristalinus quinquelineatus
- Eristalinus taeniops
- Eristalinus sepulchralis
- Eristalinus fuscicornis
- Eristalinus barclayi
- Eristalinus seychellarum
- Eristalinus aeneus
