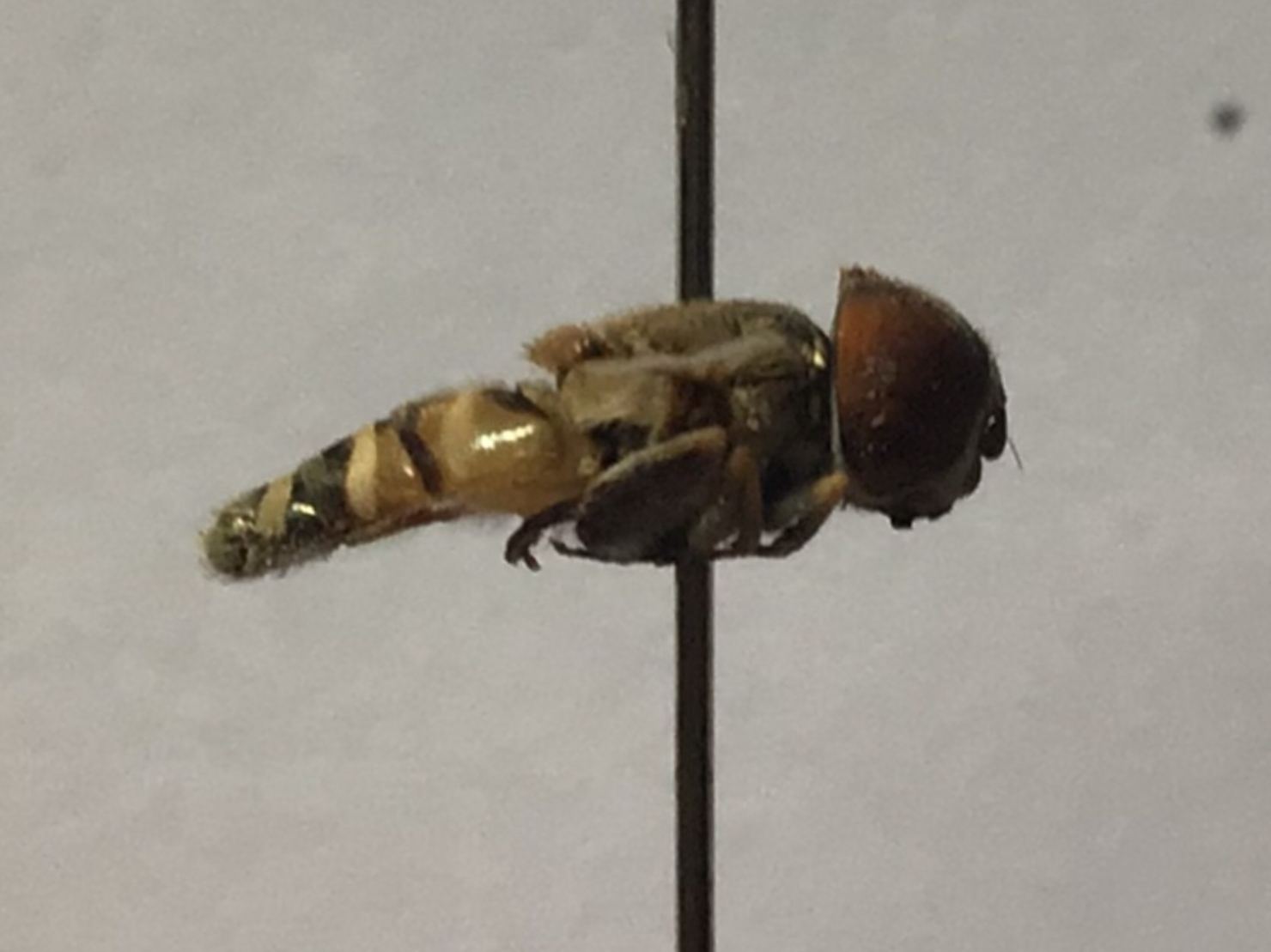
- Pinned male specimen

Scientific classification
- Kingdom: Animalia
- Phylum: Arthropoda
- Class: Insecta
- Order: Diptera
- Family: Syrphidae
- Genus: Eristalinus
- Species: E. tabanoides

Binomial name
- Eristalinus tabanoides (Jaennicke, 1867)

Synonyms
- Eristalis punctifer Walker, 1871

= Eristalinus tabanoides =

Species of fly

Eristalinus tabanoides is a species of hoverfly that inhabits the Old World.

== Description ==
=== Adult ===
E. tabanoides is a large and robust fly, with a hemispherical-shaped head and thick, stocky legs. The fly possesses a pair of small, lobed antennae with a filamentous structure protruding from each antenne, a thorax with four parallel black stripes longitudinally arranged, and an abdomen decorated with bright orange, white and black markings. The species has remarkable speckled eyes (which usually fade out in dry specimens), making them similar to Eristalinus megacephalus. However, the male of E. tabanoides depicts a “dust band” on their second tergite, which differentiates them

=== Larva ===
Like other members of its genus, the larva of E. tabanoides is a rat-tailed maggot or a “mousie”. The larva is aquatic, white and sausage-shaped with prolegs, bearing a unique posterior breathing apparatus resembling a tail which is what gives them their name. The larvae are saprovores, consuming dead organic matter in the stagnant water they inhabit using internal mouth hooks to tear it apart.

=== Puparium ===
The larva, like other hoverflies, hardens into its pupal phase as it forms a tough exoskeleton. The puparium resembles the larvae, even possessing the hardened breathing apparatus, however the anterior end is truncate and tapers posteriorly. The puparium is flat on the ventral surface, and is dark brown in colour.
