= Eristalinus barclayi =

Scientific classification
- Kingdom: Animalia
- Phylum: Arthropoda
- Clade: Pancrustacea
- Class: Insecta
- Order: Diptera
- Family: Syrphidae
- Genus: Eristalinus
- Species: E. barclayi

Binomial name
- Eristalinus barclayi Bezzi, 1915

Species of fly

Eristalinus barclayi is a species of African hoverfly found in Malawi. At 15 millimetres (0.59 in) long it is a fairly large hoverfly species. It resembles the widespread Eristalinus taeniops in its striped eyes but differs in having a strongly marked striped thorax.
