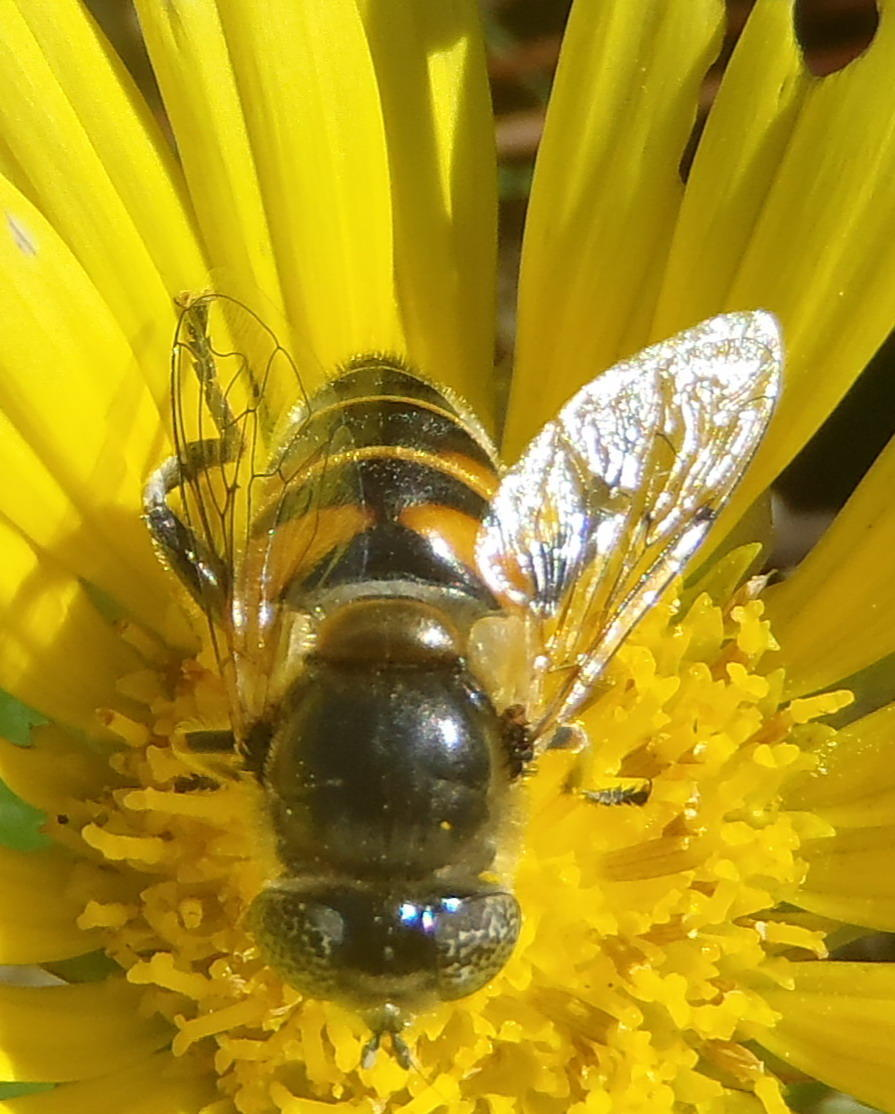
- Eristalinus modestus, South Africa

Scientific classification
- Kingdom: Animalia
- Phylum: Arthropoda
- Clade: Pancrustacea
- Class: Insecta
- Order: Diptera
- Family: Syrphidae
- Genus: Eristalinus
- Species: E. modestus

Binomial name
- Eristalinus modestus (Wiedemann, 1818)

Synonyms
- Eristalis analis Macquart, 1842; Helophilus modestus Wiedemann, 1818

= Eristalinus modestus =

Species of flies

Eristalinus modestus is a species of fly in the family Syrphidae. It is found in southern Africa.

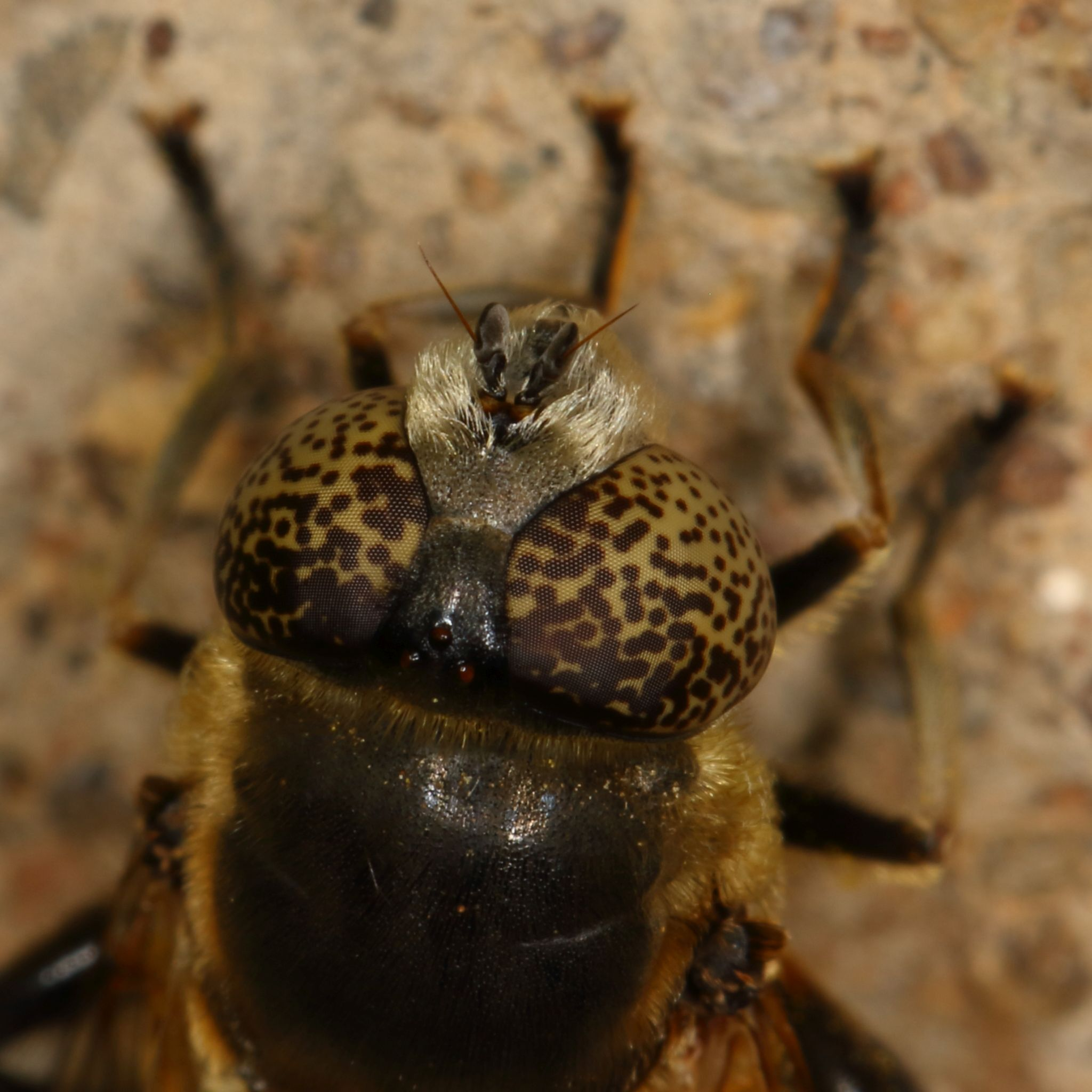
Eristalinus modestus, South Africa
