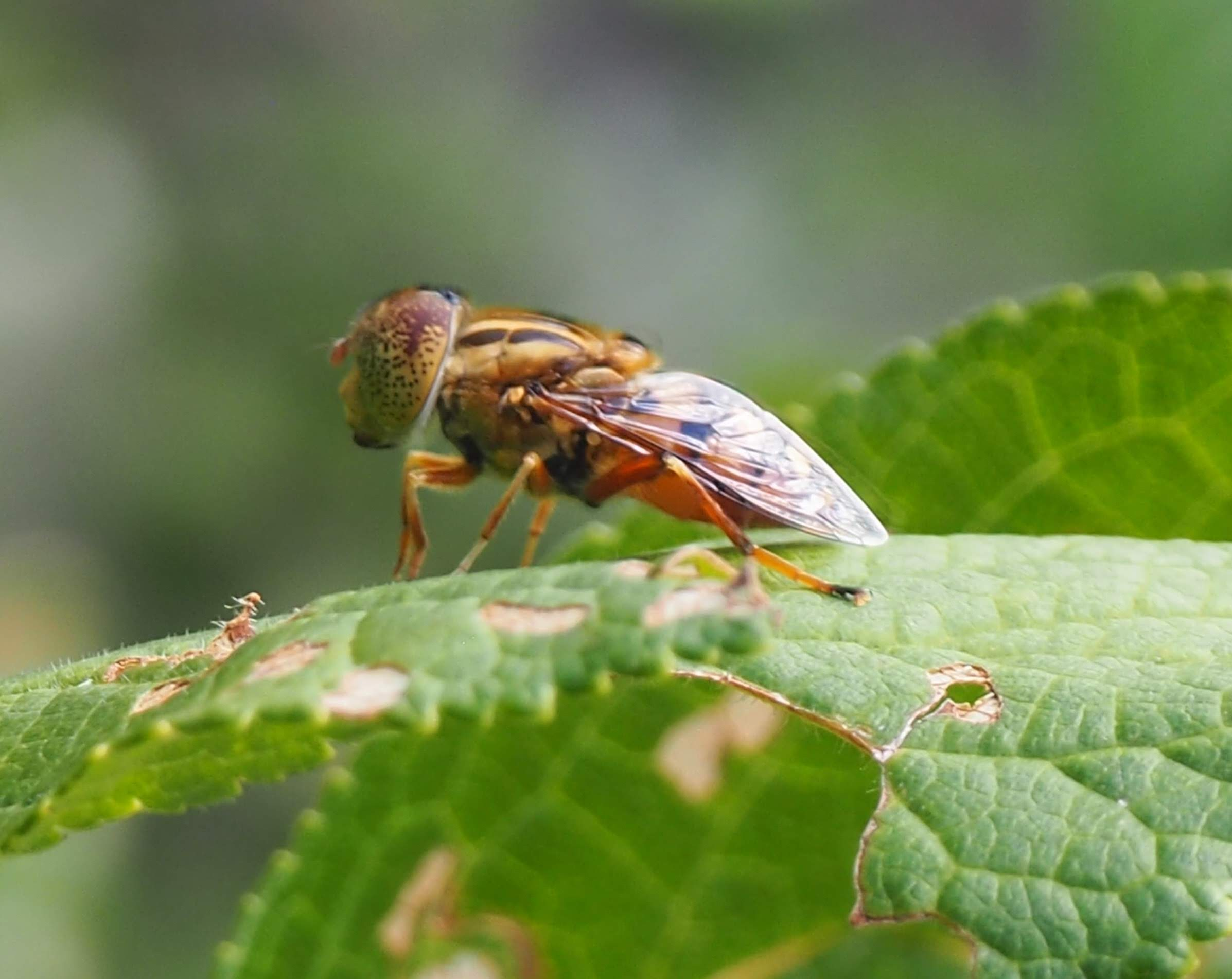

Scientific classification
- Kingdom: Animalia
- Phylum: Arthropoda
- Clade: Pancrustacea
- Class: Insecta
- Order: Diptera
- Family: Syrphidae
- Genus: Eristalinus
- Species: E. punctulatus

Binomial name
- Eristalinus punctulatus (Macquart, 1847)

Synonyms
- Eristalis agno Walker, 1849; Eristalis epitome Walker, 1852; Eristalis punctulatus Macquart, 1847

= Eristalinus punctulatus =

Species of fly

Eristalinus punctulatus is a species of hover fly within the genus Eristalinus, which is in the family Syrphidae.

== Description ==
The species has spotted eyes, with the males being holoptic and the females dichoptic. Adults are active during almost the whole year with a significant peak in summer between November and January.

== Range ==
The species is found across Australia, and has also been reported in New Caledonia and the Solomon Islands
