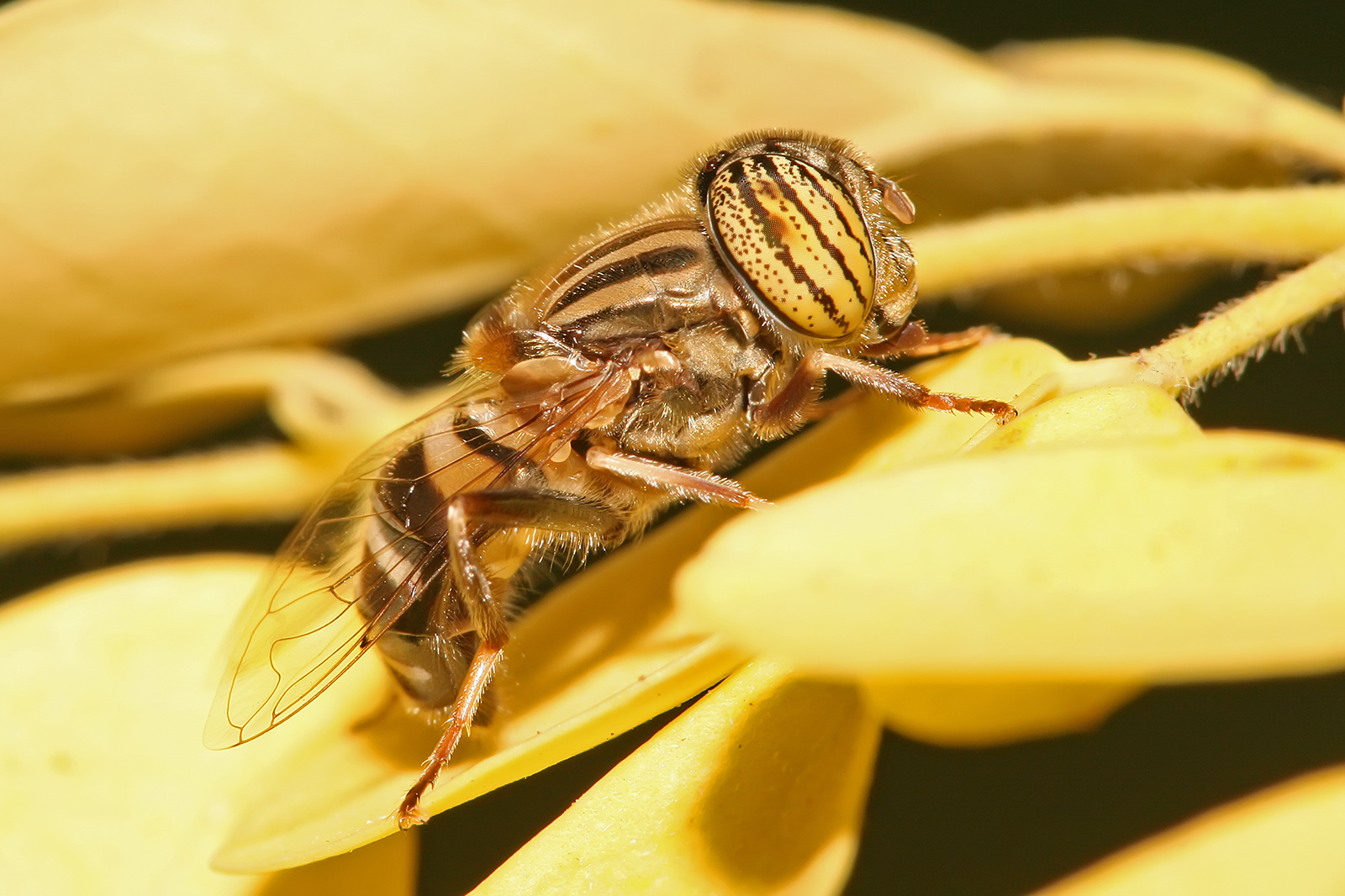
- Eristalinus fuscicornis

Scientific classification
- Kingdom: Animalia
- Phylum: Arthropoda
- Clade: Pancrustacea
- Class: Insecta
- Order: Diptera
- Family: Syrphidae
- Subfamily: Eristalinae
- Tribe: Eristalini
- Subtribe: Eristalina
- Genus: Eristalinus; Rondani, 1845

Type species
- Musca sepulchralis Linnaeus, 1758

Subgenus
- Eristalinus Rondani, 1845; Eristalodes Mik, 1897; Helophilina Becker, 1922; Lathyrophthalmus Mik, 1897; Merodonoides Curran, 1931

= Eristalinus =

Genus of flies

Eristalinus is a genus of hoverfly. Most species have very distinctive eye marking in the form of spots or banding, though these features may fade on some preserved specimens. Most are stout flies, and are nimble flyers, even compared to other hoverfly species.

== Systematics ==
At one time the members of this genus were divided into three clades (Eristalinus, Eristalodes and Lathyrophthalmus) based on morphological characters such as whether the eyes were spotted or striped. Recently Pérez-Bañon et al. studying the European species of Eristalinus using a combination of molecular data and male genitalia characters have determined that the genus in Europe at least, divides neatly into two clades - Eristalinus (+ Lathyrophthalmus) & Eristalodes. It was also discovered that the eye patterning was not taxonomically important as Eristalodes contained members with eyes either spotted or striped.

The following list is an attempt to organise some of the species under subgeneric headings:

== List of species by subgenus ==
Eristalinus

- Eristalinus riki Violovitsch, 1957
- Eristalinus sepulchralis (Linnaeus, 1758)

Lathyrophthalmus

(around 80 species; found worldwide)

- Eristalinus aeneus (Scopoli, 1763)
- Eristalinus aequalis (Adams, 1905)
- Eristalinus arvorum (Fabricius, 1787)
- Eristalinus astrops Hull, 1941
- Eristalinus basalis (Shiraki, 1968)
- Eristalinus cerealis Fabricius, 1805
- Eristalinus dissimilis (Adams, 1905)
- Eristalinus dubiosus (Curran, 1939)
- Eristalinus dulcis Karsch, 1887
- Eristalinus euzonus Loew, 1858
- Eristalinus flaveolus Bigot, 1880
- Eristalinus gymnops Bezzi, 1915
- Eristalinus haileyburyi (Nayar, 1968)
- Eristalinus hervebazini Kløcker, 1926
- Eristalinus invirgulatus (Keiser, 1958)
- Eristalinus ishigakiensis (Shiraki, 1968)
- Eristalinus japonica van der Goot, 1964
- Eristalinus kyokoae Kimura, 1986
- Eristalinus longicornis (Adams, 1905)
- Eristalinus melanops Karsch, 1887
- Eristalinus myiatropinus (Speiser, 1910)
- Eristalinus obliquus Wiedemann, 1824
- Eristalinus quinquelineatus (Fabricius, 1781)
- Eristalinus quinquestriatus (Fabricius, 1794)
- Eristalinus tabanoides (Jaennicke, 1867)
- Eristalinus tarsalis (Macquart, 1855)
- Eristalinus trizonatus (Bigot, 1858)
- Eristalinus velox (Violovitsh, 1966)
- Eristalinus vicarians Bezzi, 1915
- Eristalinus xanthopus Bezzi, 1915

Eristalodes

(13 species; Palearctic, Afrotropical, Oriental)

- Eristalinus barclayi Bezzi, 1915
- Eristalinus fuscicornis (Karsch, 1887)
- Eristalinus megacephalus (Rossi, 1794)
- Eristalinus paria (Bigot, 1880)
- Eristalinus plurivittatus Macquart, 1855
- Eristalinus seychellarum Bezzi, 1915
- Eristalinus taeniops (Wiedemann, 1818)

Helophilina (1 species; Afrotropical)

- Eristalinus taeniaticeps Becker, 1922

Merodonoides Curran, 1931 (8 species; Afrotropical, Oriental)

- Eristalinus abdominalis (Hervé-Bazin, 1914)
- Eristalinus caudatus (Doesburg, 1955)
- Eristalinus descendens (Becker, 1909)
- Eristalinus fasciatus (Macquart, 1834)
- Eristalinus gymnops (Bezzi, 1915)
- Eristalinus megametapodus Thompson, 2019
- Eristalinus modestus (Wiedemann, 1818)
- Eristalinus myiatropinus (Speiser, 1910)

== Gallery ==
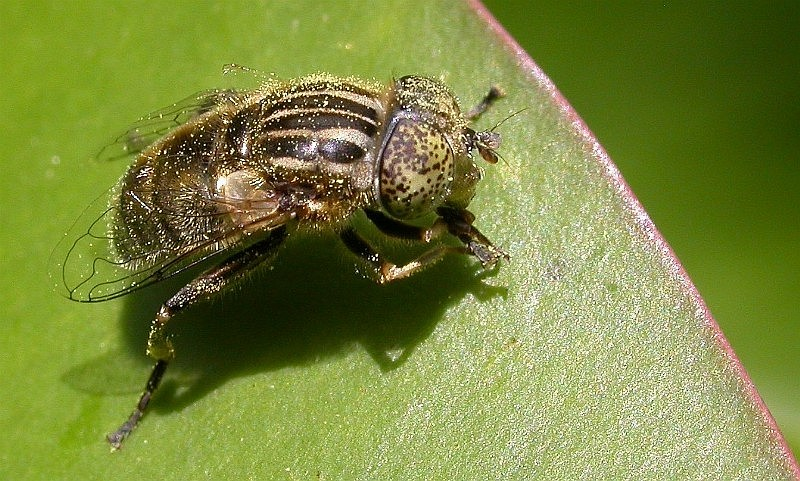
Eristalinus sepulchralis

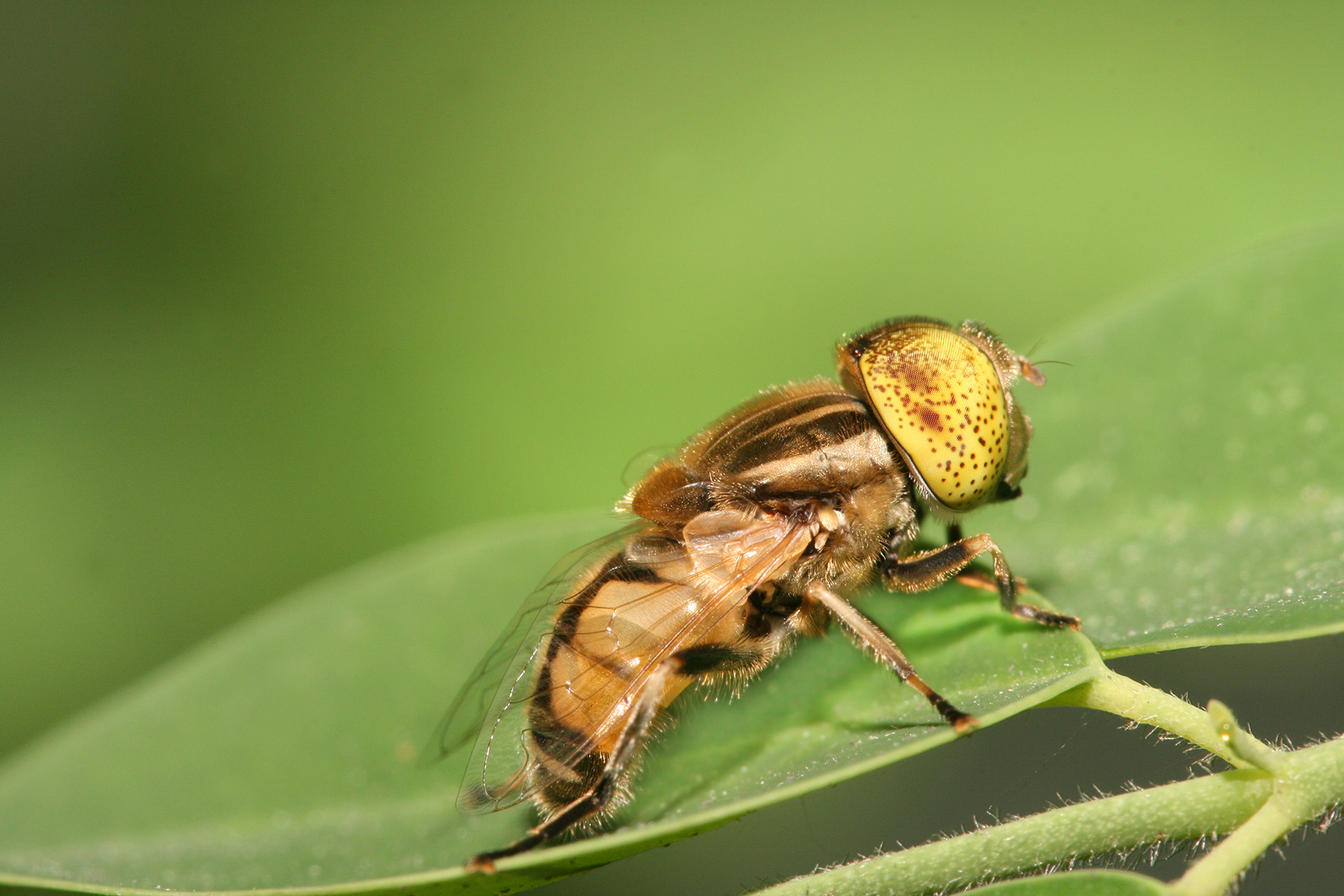
Eristalinus megacephalus

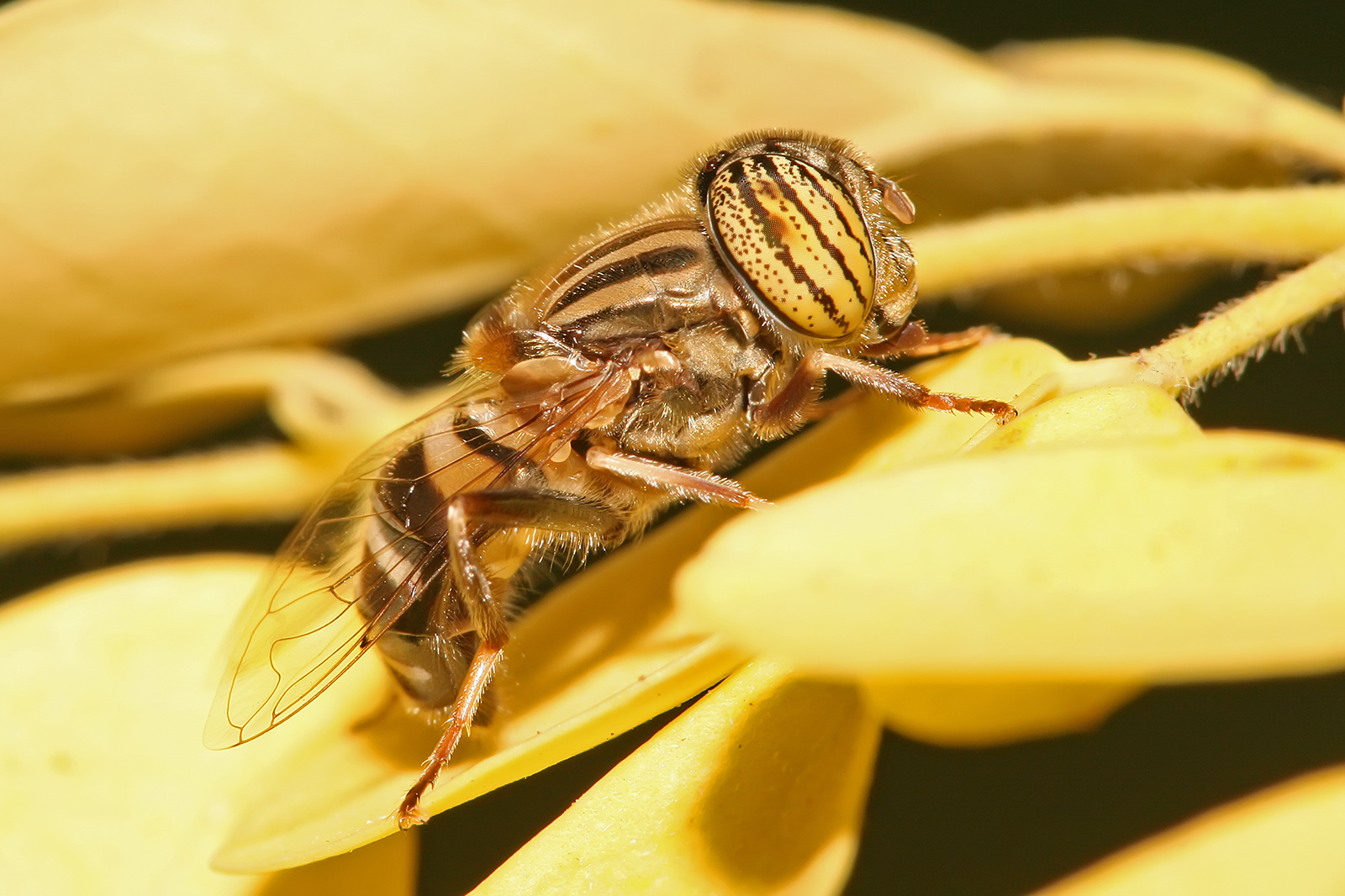
Eristalinus fuscicornis

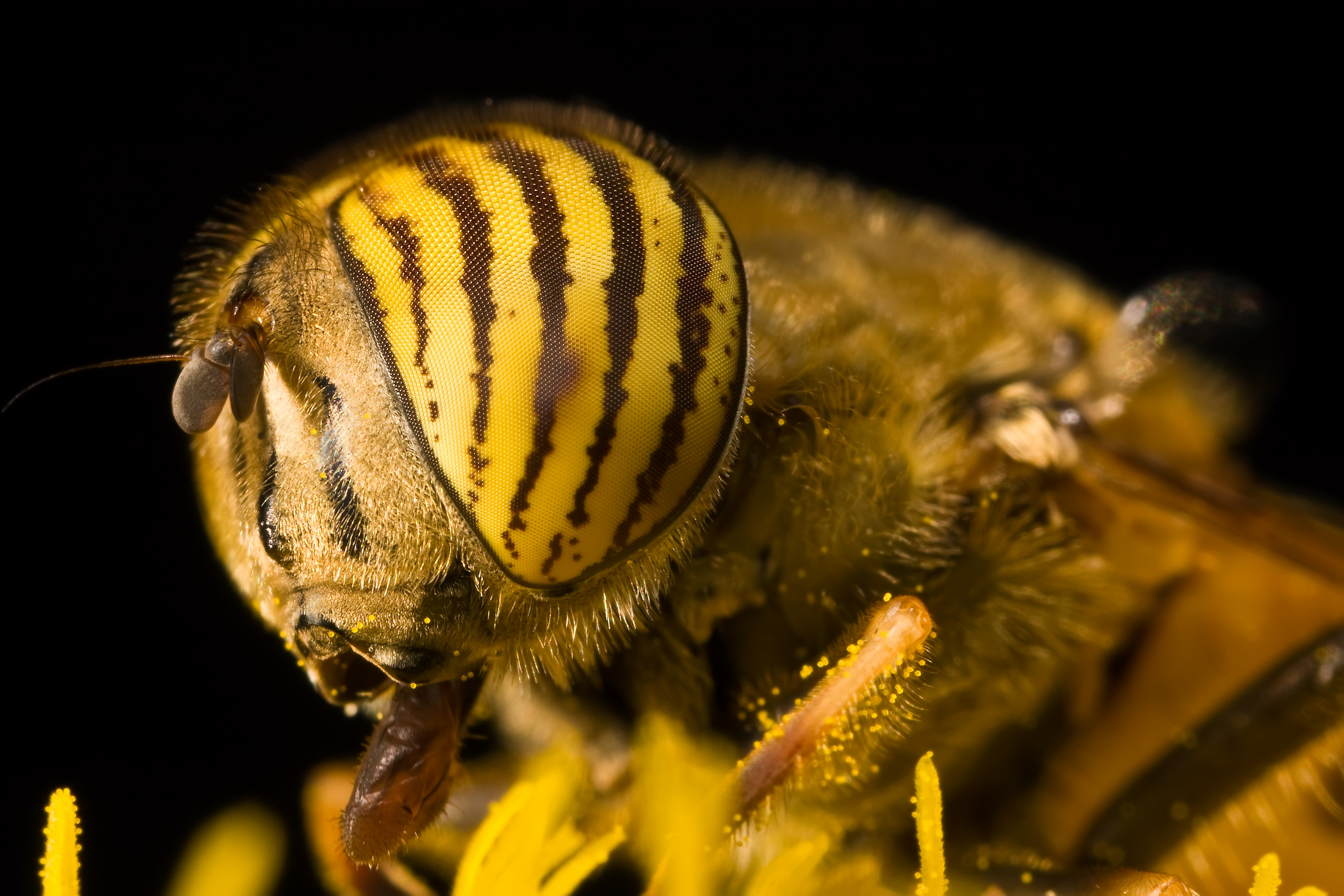
Eristalinus taeniops

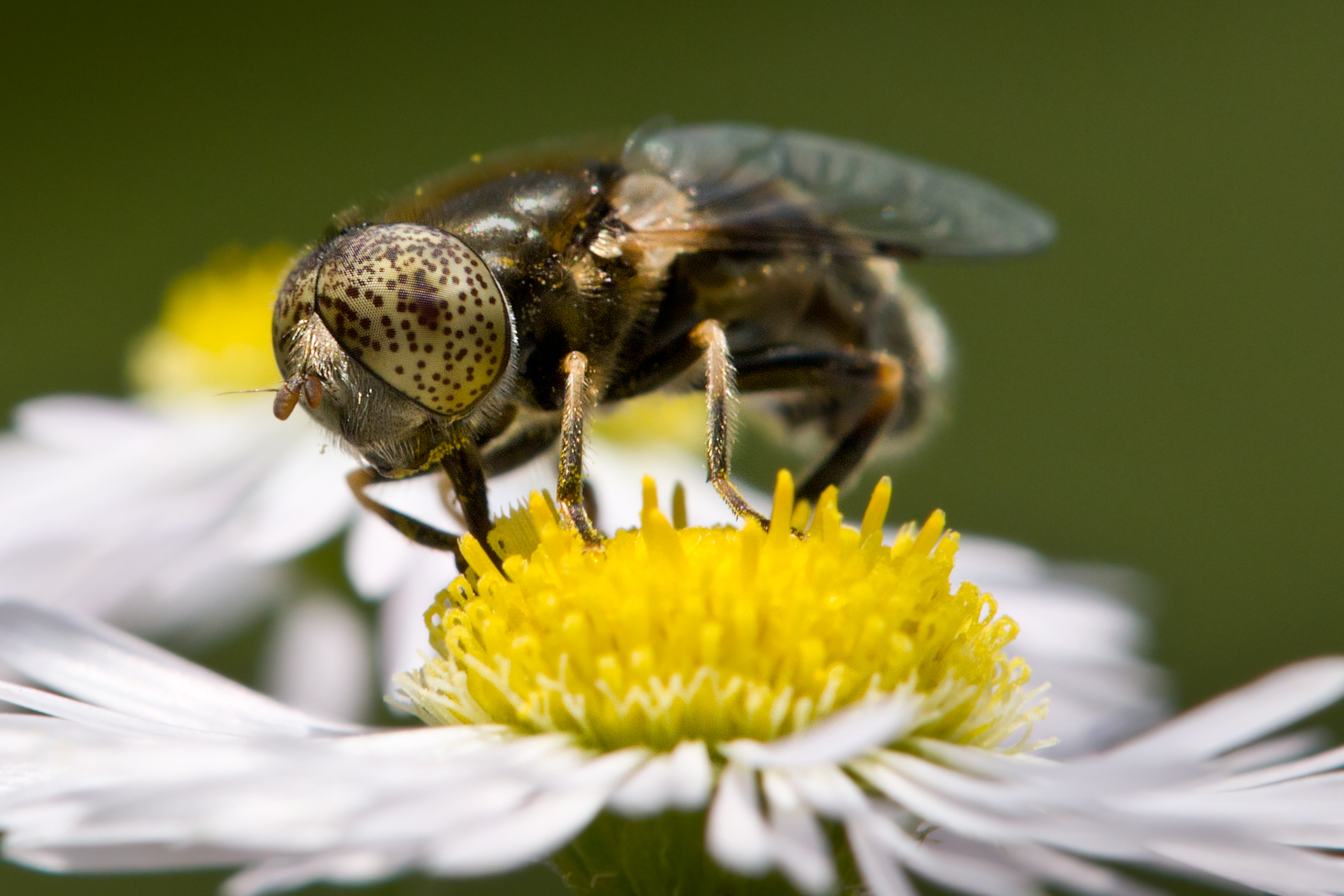
Eristalinus aeneus

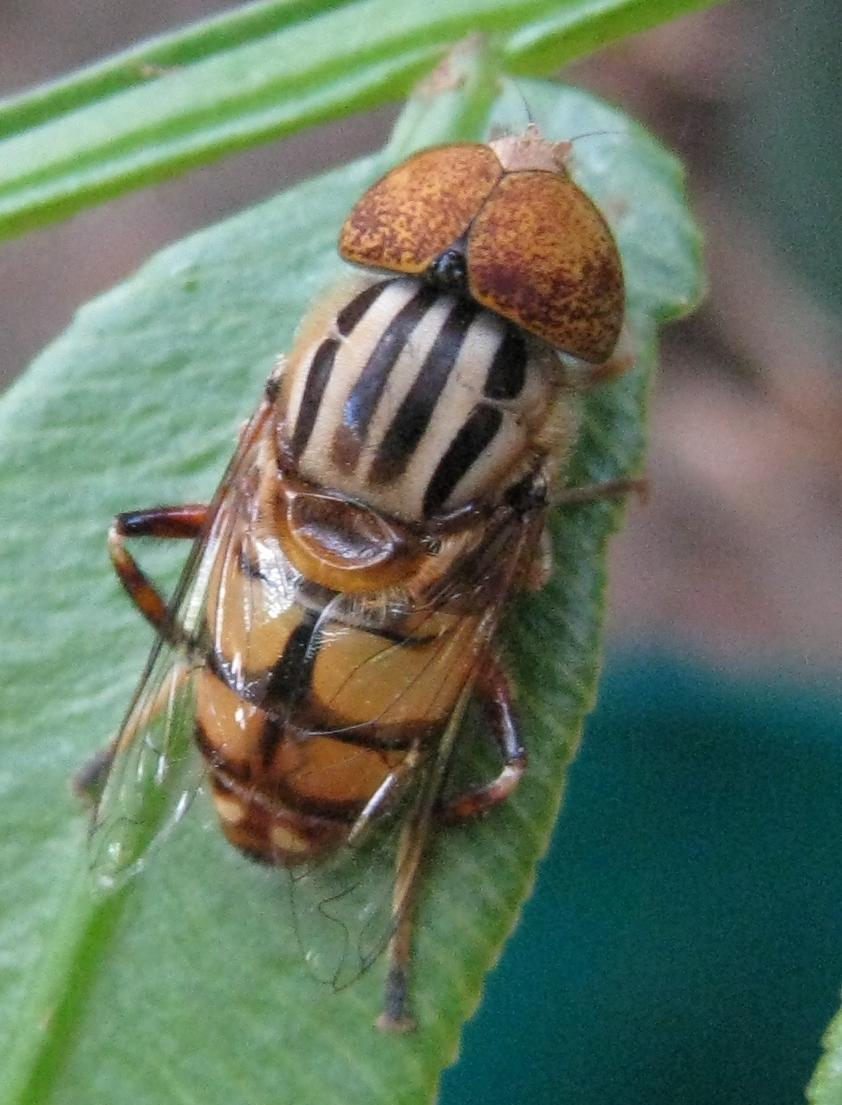
Eristalinus punctulatus

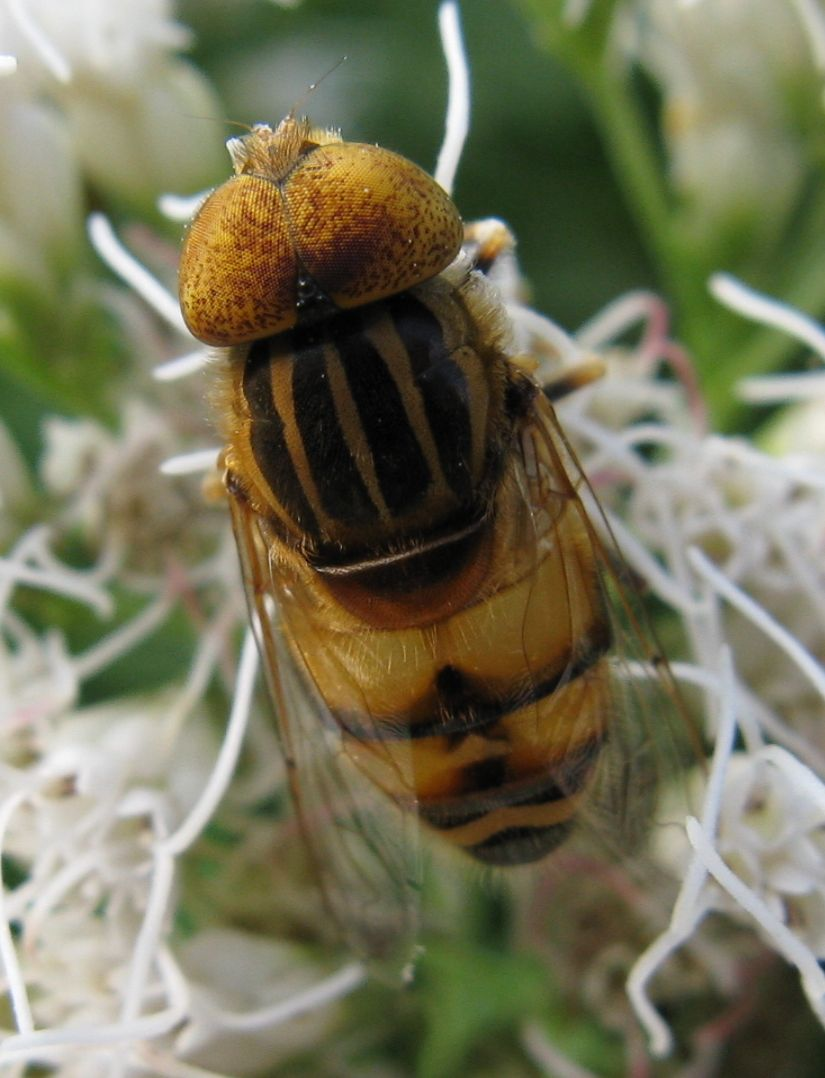
Eristalinus quinquestriatus

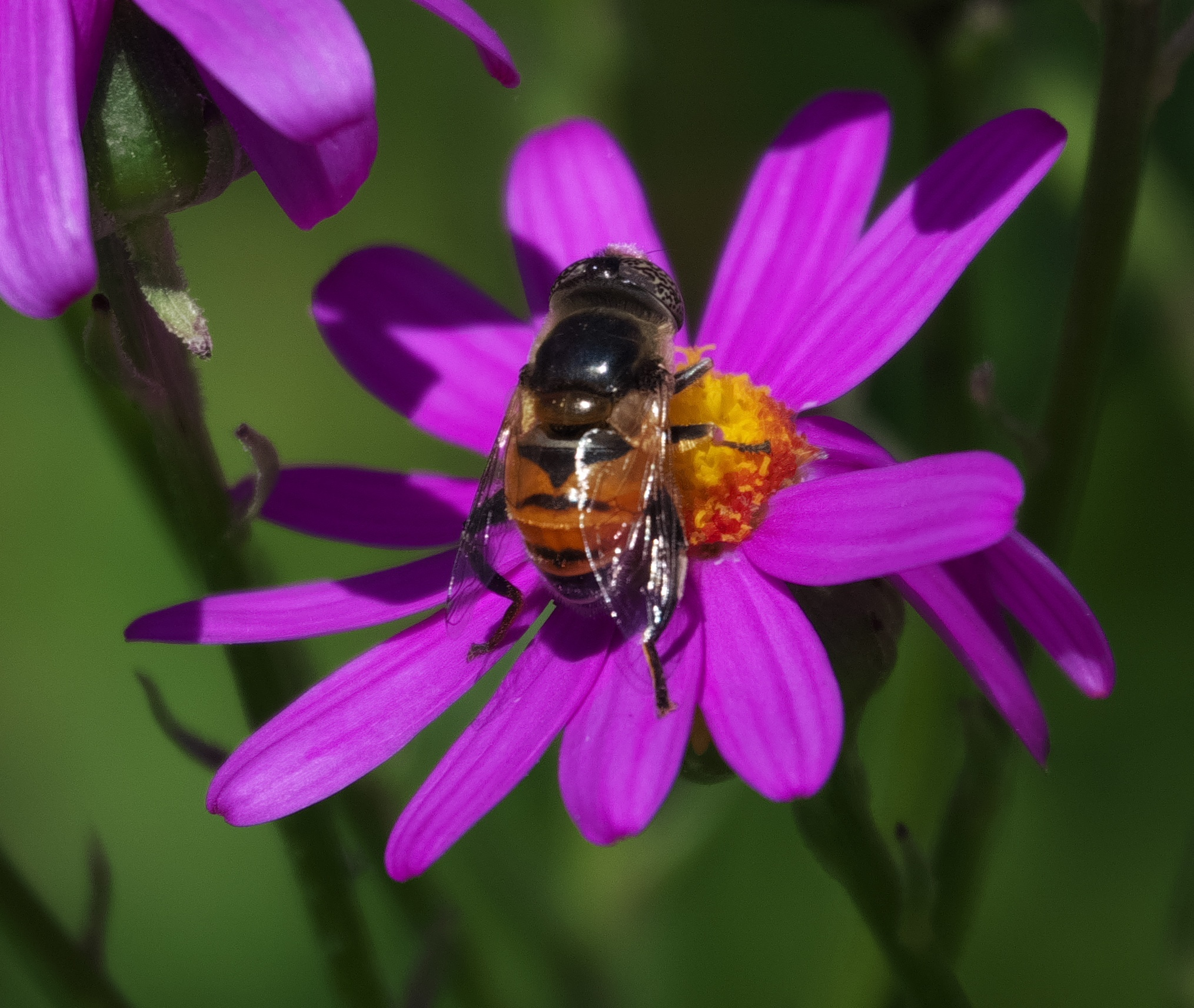
Eristalinus modestus
