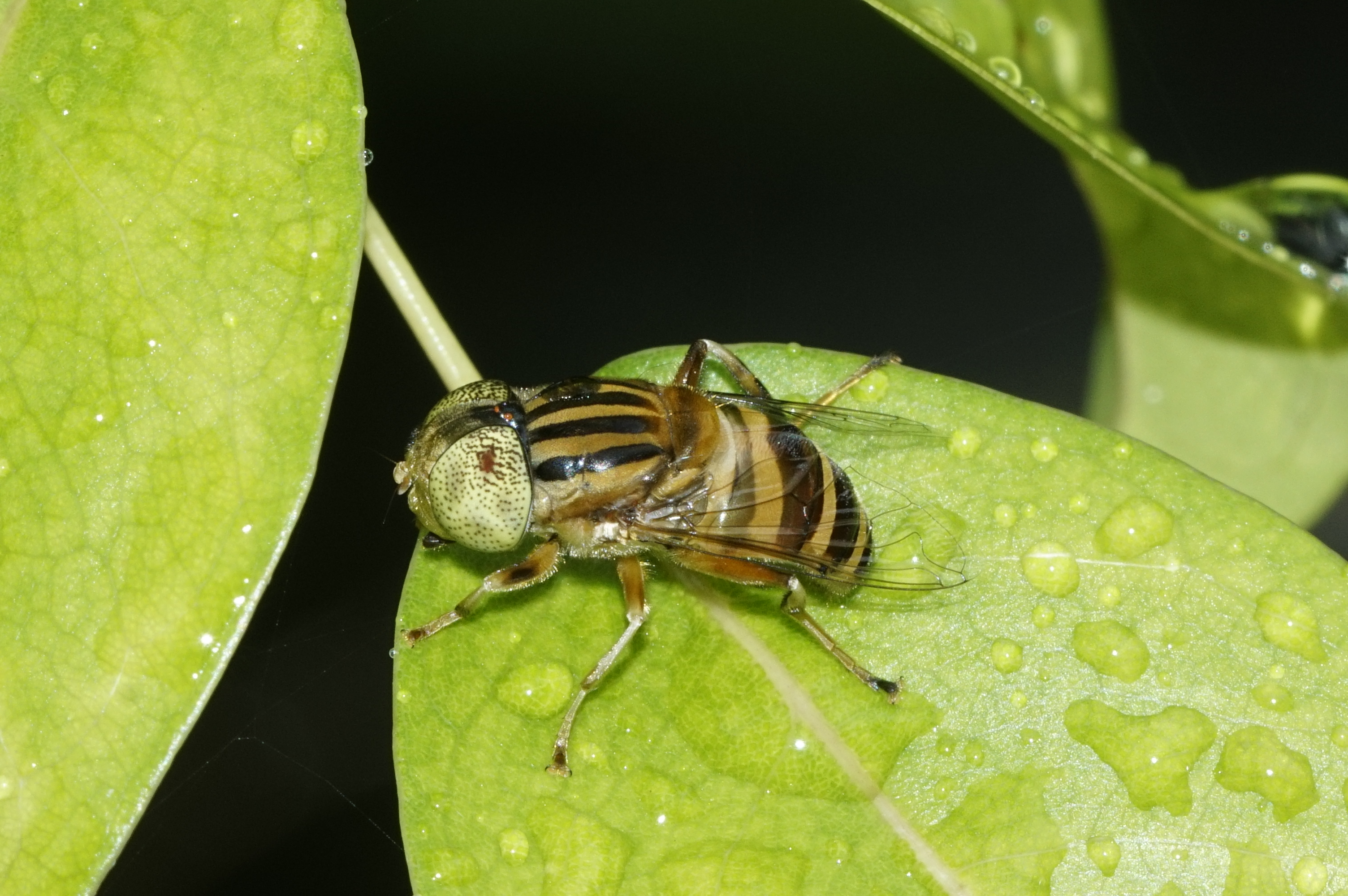
- Eristalinus quinquestriatus male

Scientific classification
- Kingdom: Animalia
- Phylum: Arthropoda
- Clade: Pancrustacea
- Class: Insecta
- Order: Diptera
- Family: Syrphidae
- Genus: Eristalinus
- Species: E. quinquelineatus

Binomial name
- Eristalinus quinquelineatus (Fabricius, 1781)

= Eristalinus quinquelineatus =

Species of fly

Eristalinus quinquelineatus is species of hoverfly found in Africa, Asia and Europe.
