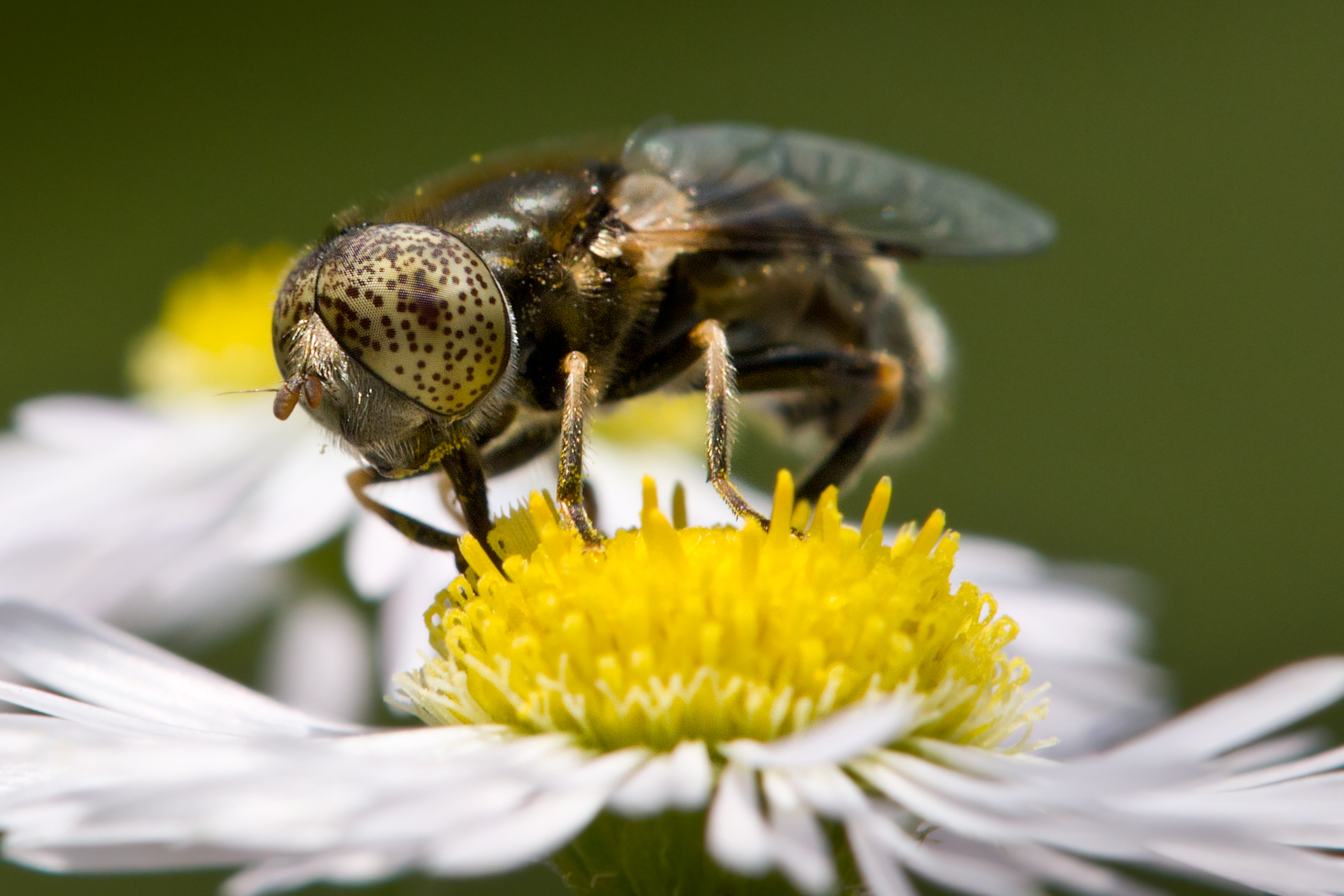
- male
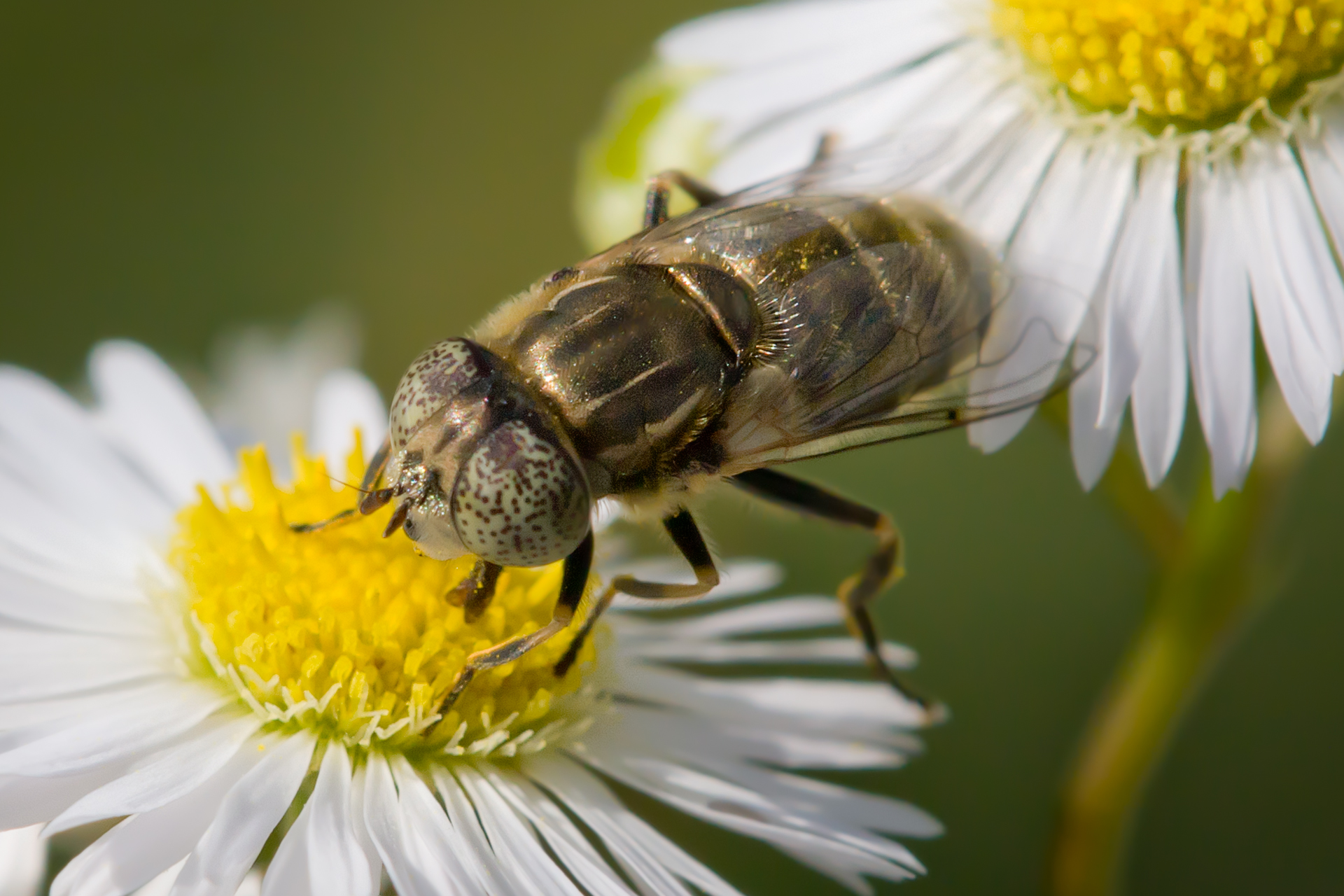
- female

Conservation status
- Least Concern (IUCN 3.1)

Scientific classification
- Kingdom: Animalia
- Phylum: Arthropoda
- Class: Insecta
- Order: Diptera
- Family: Syrphidae
- Genus: Eristalinus
- Species: E. aeneus

Binomial name
- Eristalinus aeneus (Scopoli, 1763)

Synonyms
- Conops aeneus Scopoli, 1763; Eristalis stygius Newman, 1835

= Eristalinus aeneus =

Species of fly

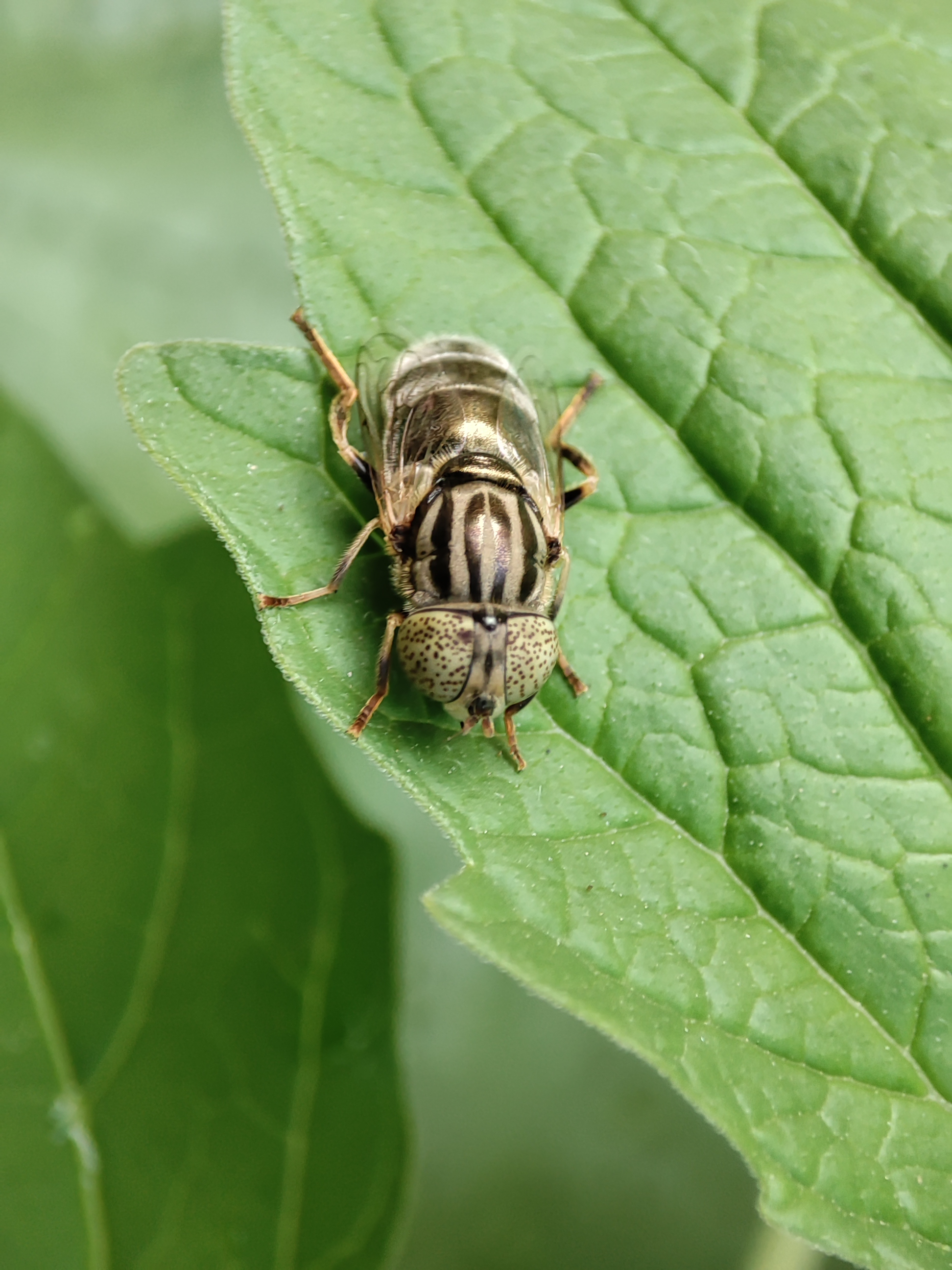
Eristalinus Aeneus in Behbahan, Iran

Eristalinus aeneus (Scopoli, 1763), the common lagoon fly, is a fairly common species of syrphid fly observed throughout the United States and Europe. Hoverflies can remain nearly motionless in flight. The adults are also known as flower flies for they are commonly found on flowers, from which they get both energy-giving nectar and protein-rich pollen. The larvae occurs along shorelines in rock pools containing large amounts of decaying seaweed.

== Description ==
For terms see Morphology of Diptera

The wing length is 6.5–9.25 mm. The eyes are patterned with obvious black spots. Tergites 2 and 3 are completely shiny. The thoracic dorsum has faint greyish stripes (in Southern Europe it has five strong grey stripes). In males the eyes meet on the frons. In females the eyes are bare on the lower half. The hind tibiae have a black ring after middle, and all tarsi with segments 2–4 darkened. The male genitalia are figured by Pérez-Bañón et al (2003). The larva is figured by Hartley (1961).

== Distribution ==
The distribution of this species is cosmopolitan. inaturalist map

== Biology ==
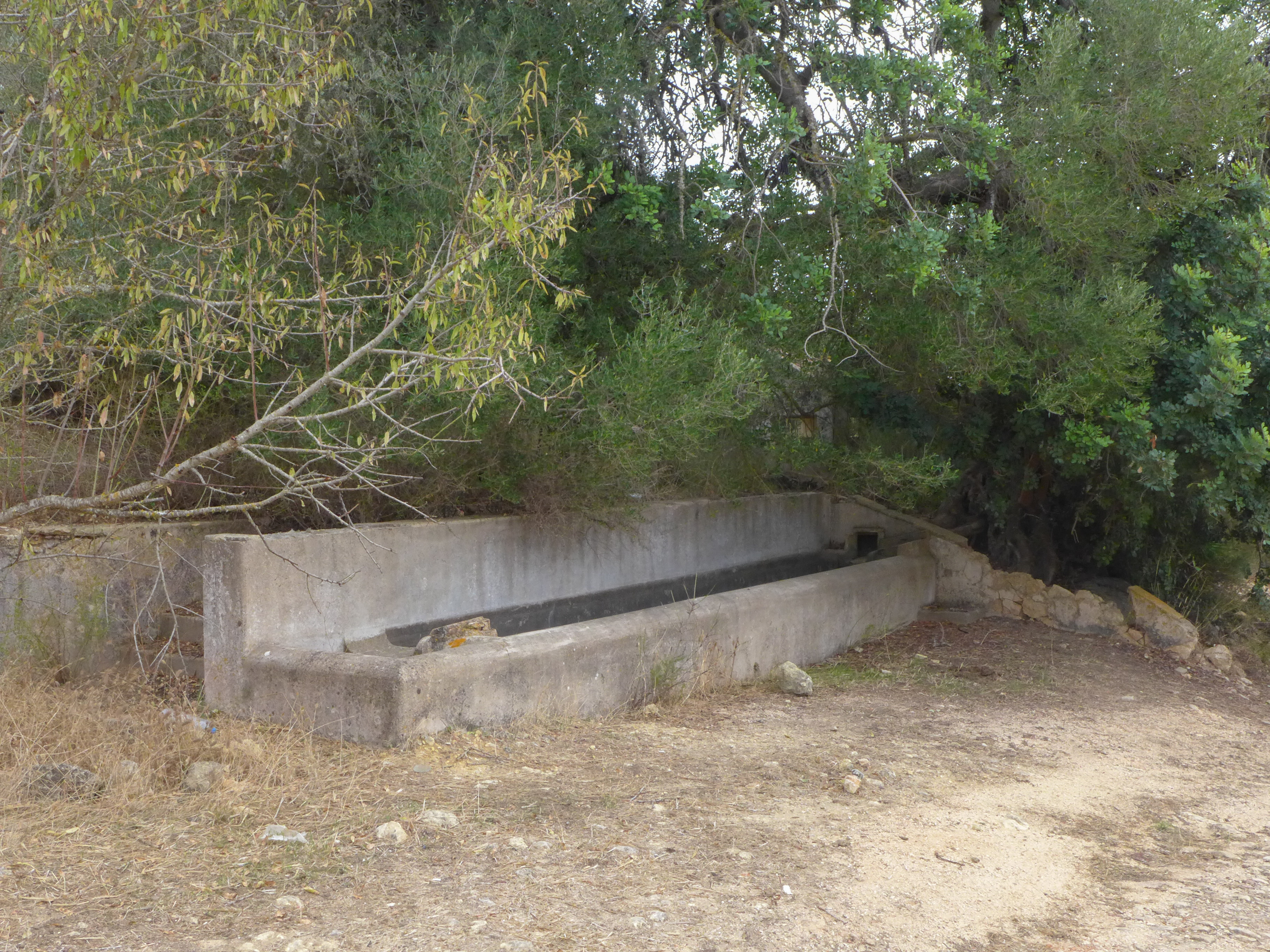
Disused water trough habitat in Portugal

The habitat for this species is freshwater: coastal lagoons, ponds, slow-moving rivers, streams and irrigation ditches. The species is anthropophilic in southern Europe; towards the northern edge of its range there it is confined to coastal sites. The species flies very fast and low over ground vegetation, and feeds on yellow composites and white umbellifers: Aster, Berteroa incana, Cistus, Origanum, Salix repens, Taraxacum. The flight period is April to October, and it overwinters as an adult.

In the north, the larvae of E. aeneus occur in freshwater seapages and brackish rock pools on the sea coast, but elsewhere they occur in a variety of freshwater habitats, including in association with animal dung and in sewage farms.
