= Eristalinus seychellarum =

Scientific classification
- Kingdom: Animalia
- Phylum: Arthropoda
- Clade: Pancrustacea
- Class: Insecta
- Order: Diptera
- Family: Syrphidae
- Genus: Eristalinus
- Species: E. seychellarum

Binomial name
- Eristalinus seychellarum (Bezzi, 1915)

Synonyms
- Eristalodes seychellarum Bezzi, 1915

Species of fly

Eristalinus seychellarum is a species of hoverfly found in the Seychelles. It is black with blue reflections and red and orange striped eyes.
