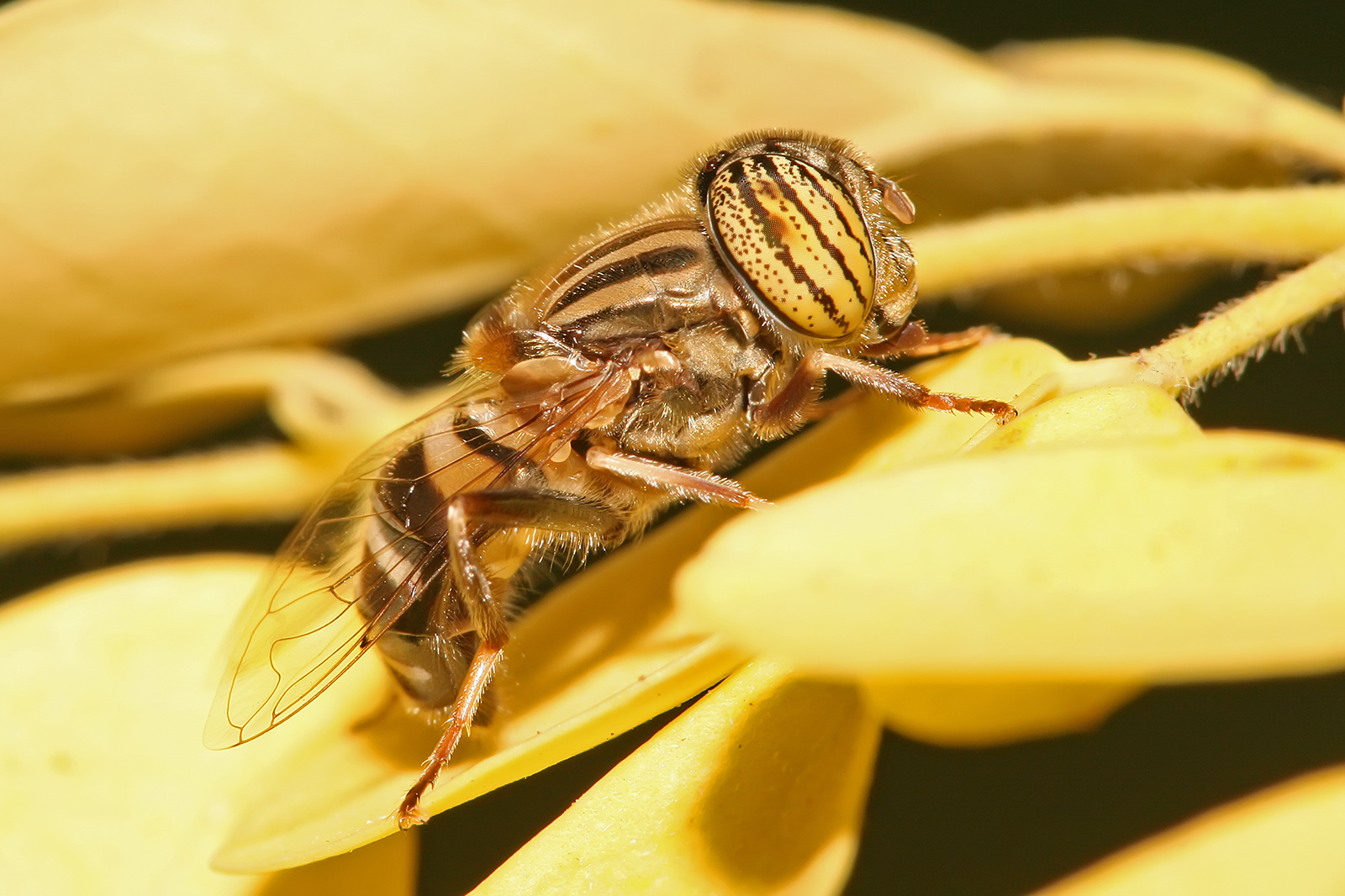

Scientific classification
- Kingdom: Animalia
- Phylum: Arthropoda
- Class: Insecta
- Order: Diptera
- Family: Syrphidae
- Genus: Eristalinus
- Species: E. fuscicornis

Binomial name
- Eristalinus fuscicornis Karsch, 1887

Synonyms
- Eristalodes marshalli Curran, 1929

= Eristalinus fuscicornis =

Species of fly

Eristalinus fuscicornis is a species of hoverfly. It is native to sub-saharan Africa, with specimens being identified from Angola, Benin, DR Congo, Kenya, Mozambique, Nigeria, South Africa, Sudan/South Sudan, Togo, and Zimbabwe.
