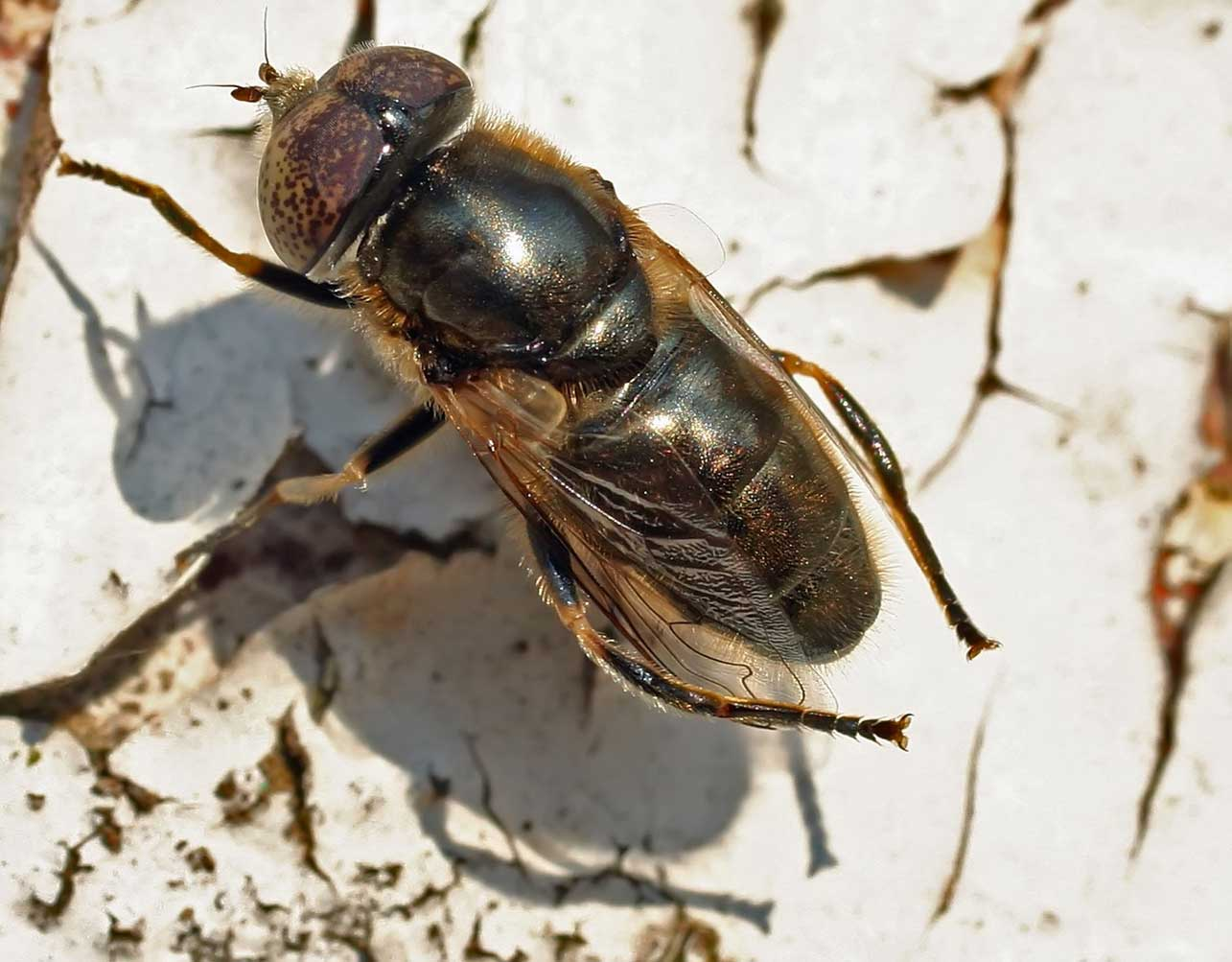
- male
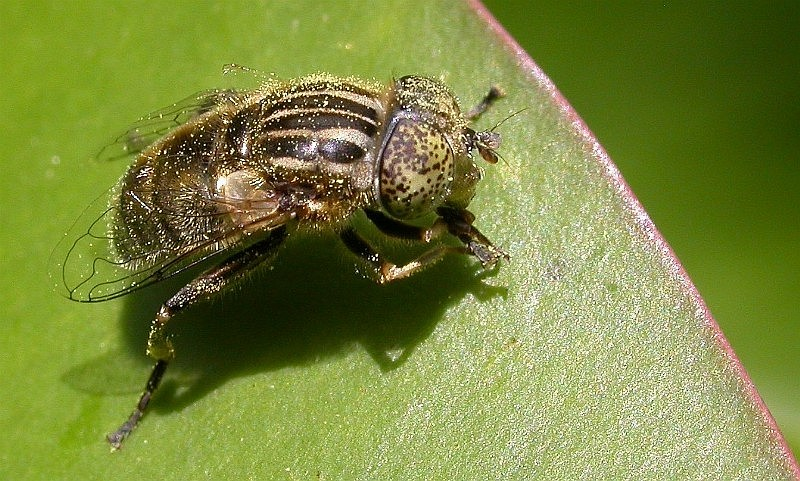
- female

Scientific classification
- Kingdom: Animalia
- Phylum: Arthropoda
- Class: Insecta
- Order: Diptera
- Family: Syrphidae
- Genus: Eristalinus
- Species: E. sepulchralis

Binomial name
- Eristalinus sepulchralis (Linnaeus, 1758)

Synonyms
- Eristalinus ater (Harris, 1776); Eristalinus melanius (Harris, 1776); Musca ater Harris, 1776; Musca melanius Harris, 1776; Musca sepulchralis Linnaeus, 1758

= Eristalinus sepulchralis =

Species of fly

Eristalinus sepulchralis is a European species of hoverfly. The species are brownish-white from a close up, and look like a wasp. From a distance though, they are yellowish-black coloured, and look like a bumble bee. The species can be found throughout Europe in the Baltic states, North Europe, Central, Southern and Western Europe and across the Palaearctic to Kamchatka, Japan, China and India. Finland, Great Britain, Hungary, Ireland, Norway, and the Netherlands.

== Technical Description ==
External images For terms see Morphology of Diptera

Wing length 6 ·5–8 mm. Eyes patterned with conspicuous black spots and hairy all over in both sexes. Tergites black with green or other reflections. Tergites 2 and 3 with a dull spot. Male eyes well separated on frons. Thoracic dorsum with five grey stripes. The male genitalia and larva are figured by Pérez-Bañón et al. (2003). The larva is figured by Hartley (1961)

== Biology ==
Habitat is wetland, fen, river and pond margins. Anthropophilic and occurring where stock is pastured, along polluted ditches and in the vicinity of slurry pits. Flowers visited include white umbellifers, Achillea millefolium, Allium, Armeria maritima, Bellis perennis, Bidens cernua, Caltha, Cochlearia danica, Crataegus, Euphorbia, Galium, Leontodon, Origanum vulgare, Potentilla erecta, Ranunculus, Rosa, Rubus fruticosus, Salix, Senecio jacobaea, Solidago virgaurea, Sorbus aucuparia, Taraxacum, Tussilago, Valeriana dioica.

The flight period is mid-April to September (March to October in southern Europe). The larvae are associated with rotting vegetation in a ponds and small water bodies rich in nutrients.
