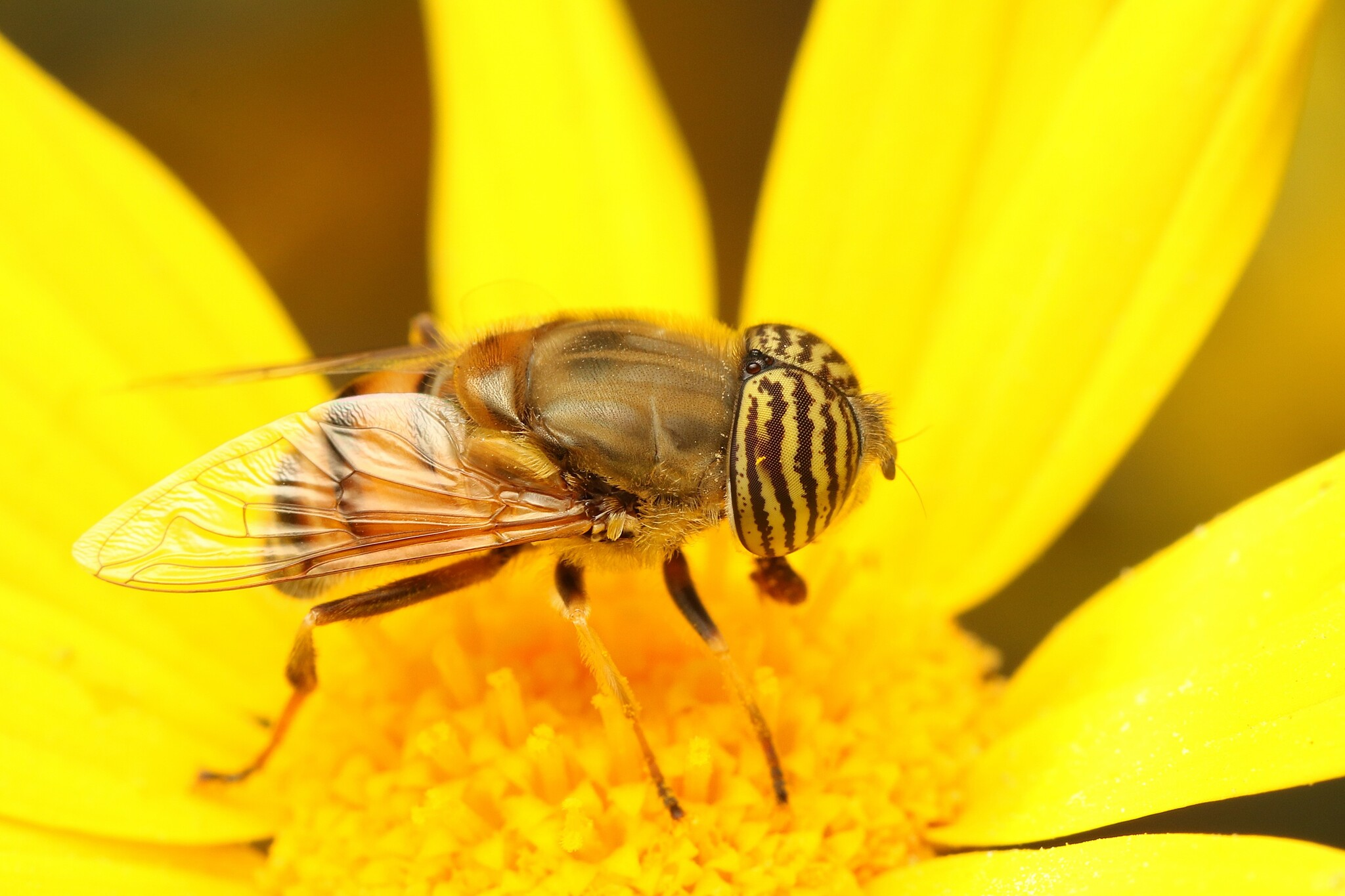
- Male, Israel
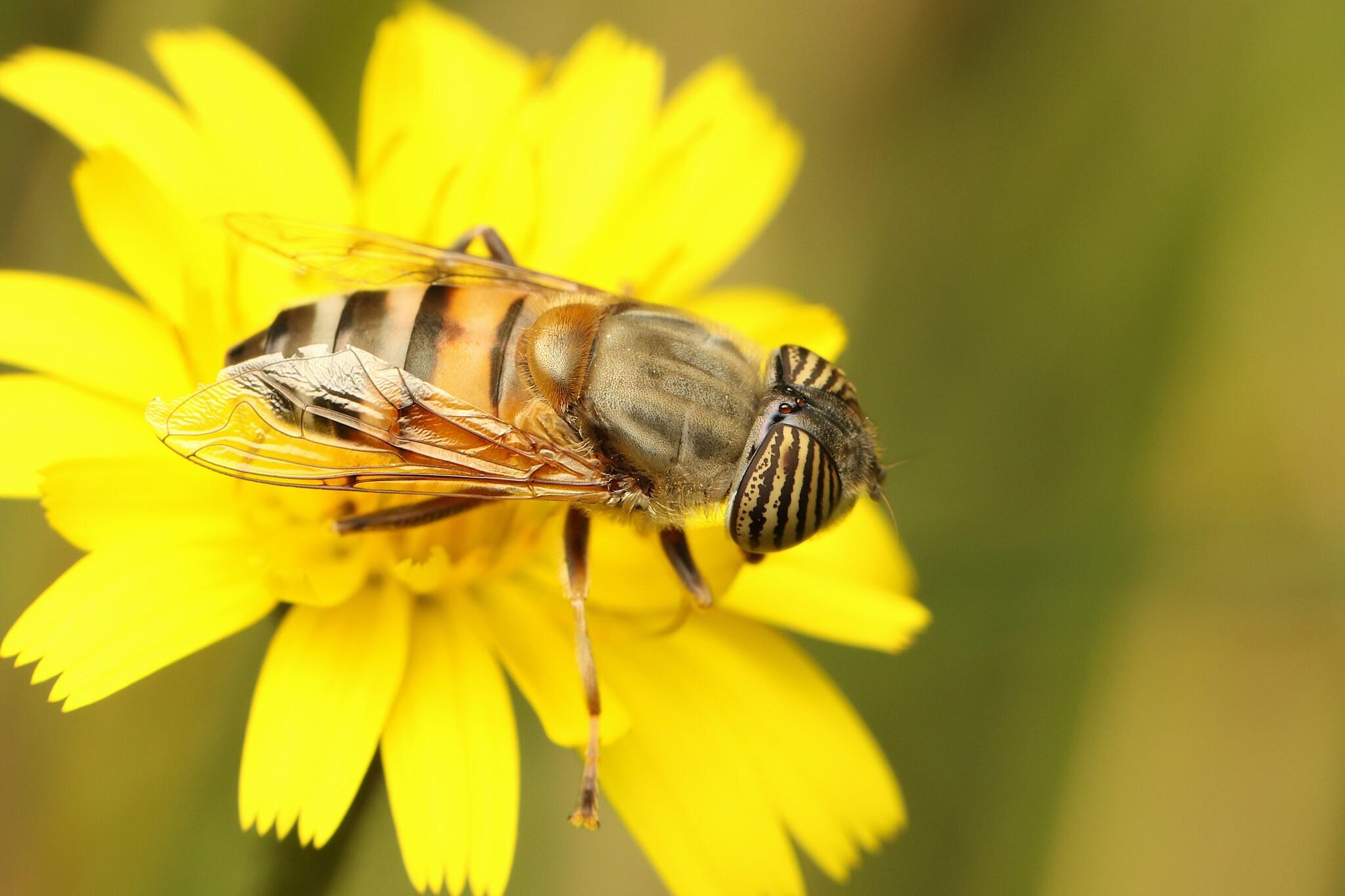
- Female, Israel

Scientific classification
- Kingdom: Animalia
- Phylum: Arthropoda
- Clade: Pancrustacea
- Class: Insecta
- Order: Diptera
- Family: Syrphidae
- Genus: Eristalinus
- Species: E. taeniops

Binomial name
- Eristalinus taeniops (Wiedemann, 1818)

Synonyms
- List: Eristalis aegyptius Walker, 1849; Eristalis communis Adams, 1905; Eristalis completa Abreu, 1924; Eristalis concinna Abreu, 1924; Eristalis secretus Walker, 1849; Eristalis torridus Walker, 1849; Helophilus pulchriceps Wiedemann, 1822

= Eristalinus taeniops =

Species of fly

Eristalinus taeniops is a species of hoverfly, also known as the band-eyed drone fly.

== Distribution ==
This species is present in part of Europe (Albania, Balearic Islands, Bulgaria, the Canary Islands, Cyprus, France, Greece, Italy, Malta, North Macedonia, Poland, Portugal, Spain), in North Africa, in the Near East (Turkey, Lebanon, Israel, Syria), in the Caucasus, in the Eastern parts of Afrotropical realm to South Africa, in the Oriental realm (Nepal, Northern India), in Northern Pakistan and in Iran. It has been introduced to parts of North America (California and Florida). Recently this species has been discovered in Rio de Janeiro, Poços de Caldas, Curitiba, Brazil, Nova Maringá, Brazil and Buenos Aires, Argentina, On March 25, 2025, the same species was found in the State of Goiás to in Brazil.

== Habitat ==
These hoverflies can be found in holly oak forests, in forest clearings, maquis, rivers, streams, and in coastal marshes.

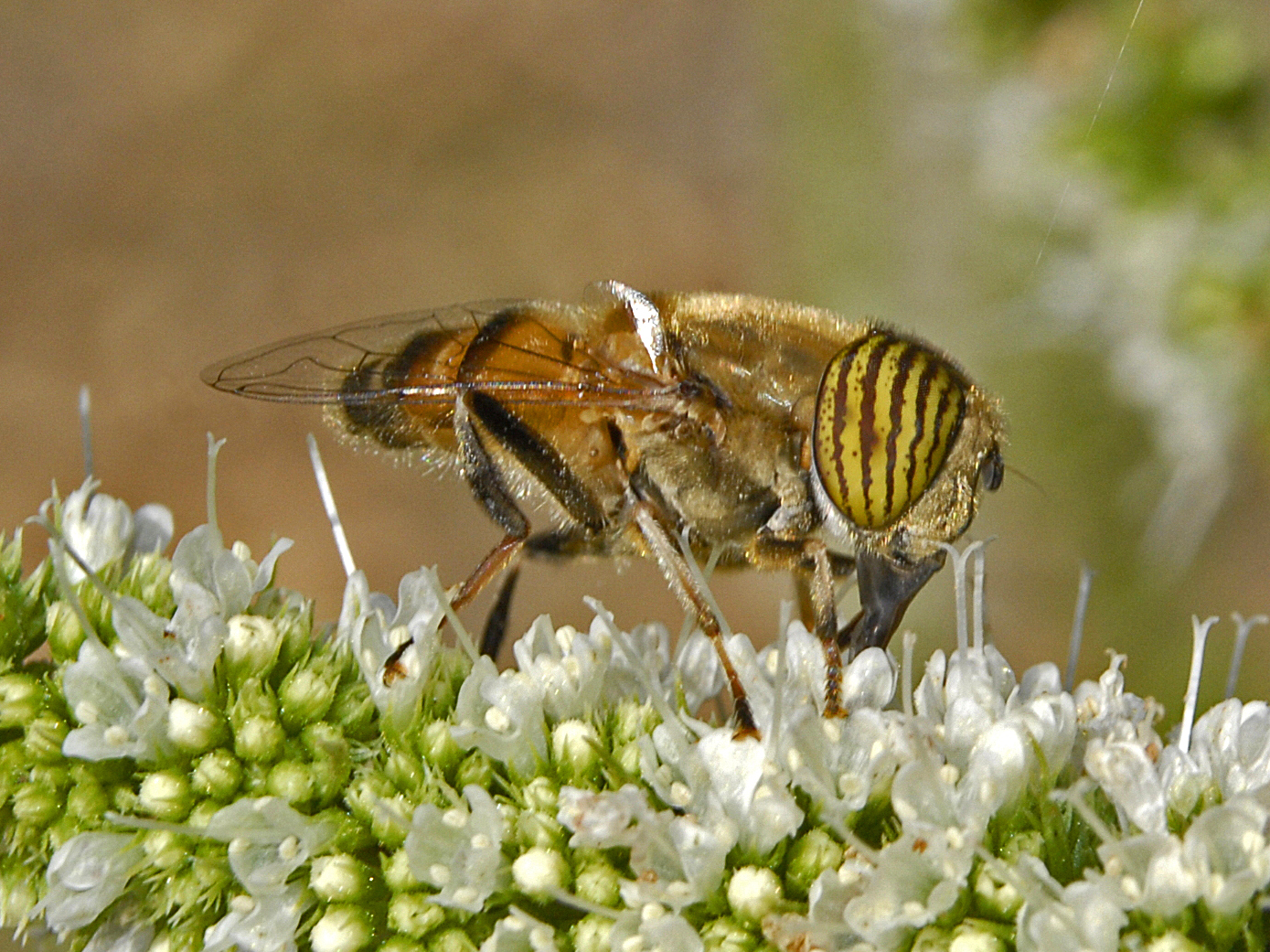
Side view

== Description ==
Eristalinus taeniops can reach a length of 11–14 millimetres (0.43–0.55 in). These hoverflies exhibit a bee-like yellow and black coloration (Batesian mimicry) and are often mistaken for wasps or bees. The thorax has a metallic yellow-brown color and it is densely yellow hairy. Also the scutellum are yellow-brown colored. The abdomen is reddish-yellow, with transversal black bands. The compound eyes have five distinct, vertical, dark stripes. The wings are transparent, usually yellowish-brown at the base, while the halteres are brightly pale yellow colored.

== Biology ==
Adults of these hoverflies can be found from April to October with a peak from May to August. They feed on nectar of yellow and white flowers such as Erica, Daphne, Senecio and Rosaceae species. The larvae live as rat-tailed maggots, mainly in the mud, in animal carcasses and in water contaminated by pig manure.

== Gallery ==
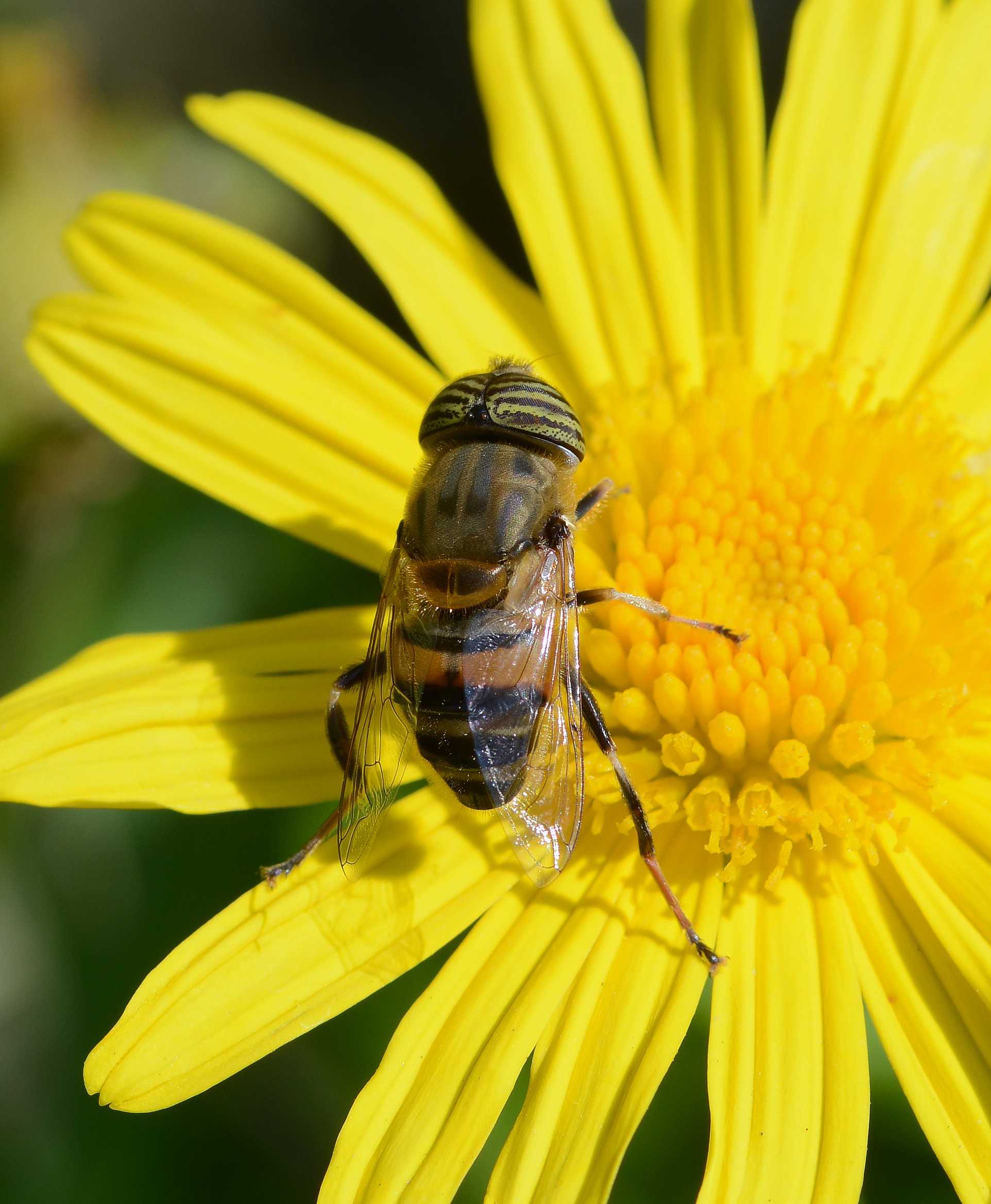
Eristalinus taeniops. Male

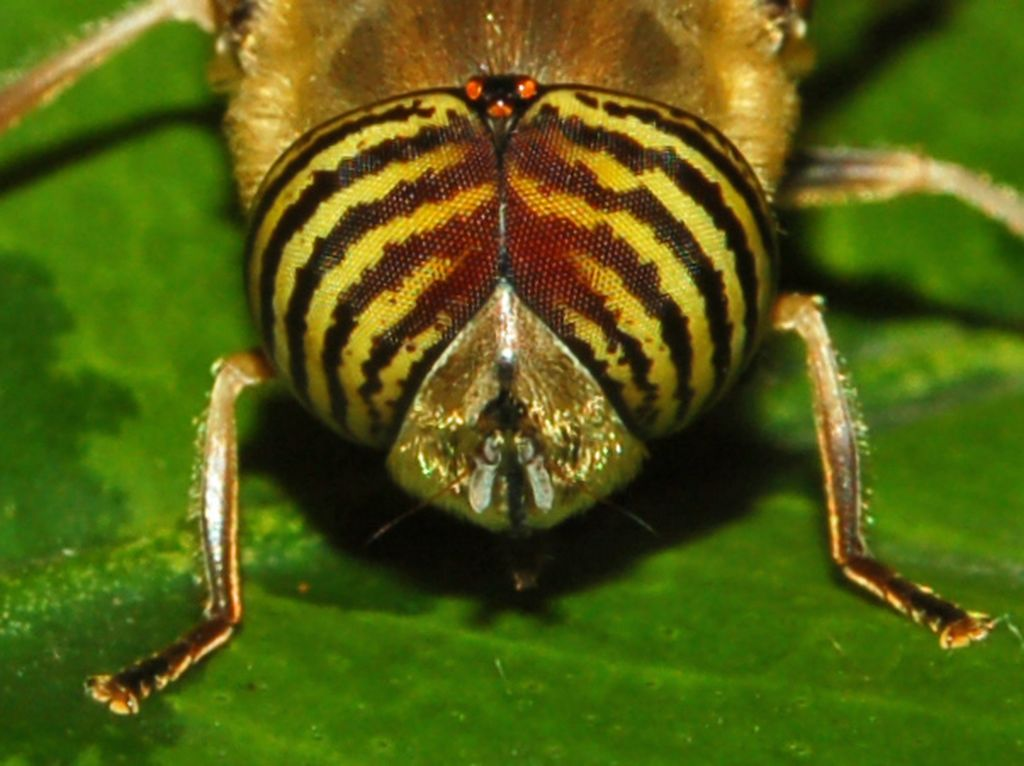
Male eyes (Close-up)

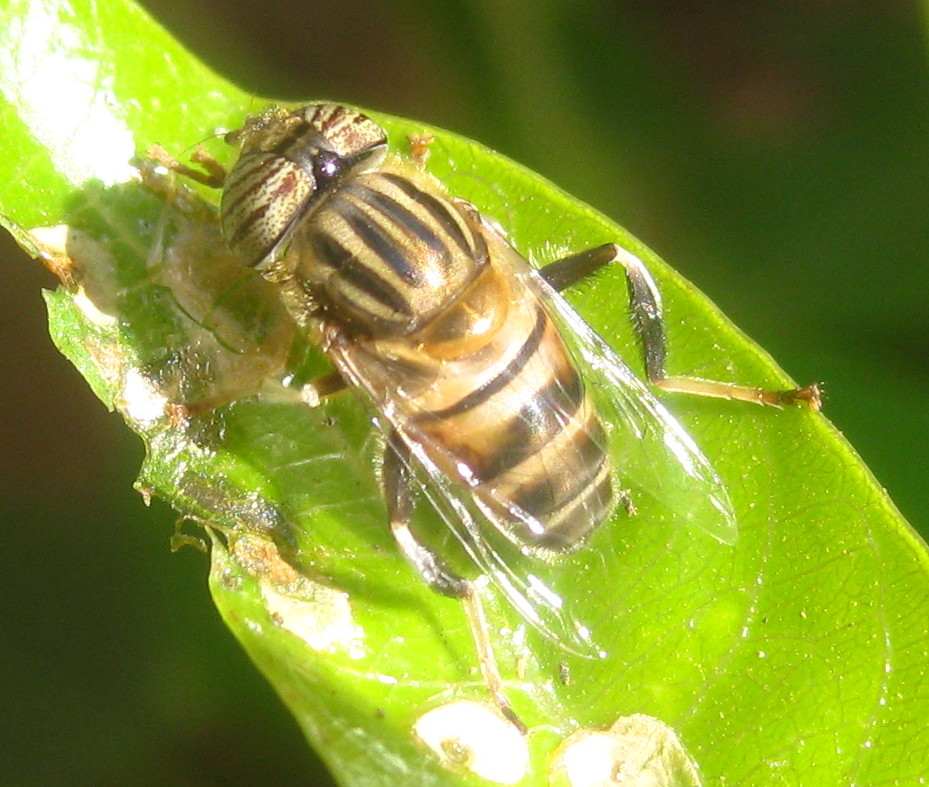
Female

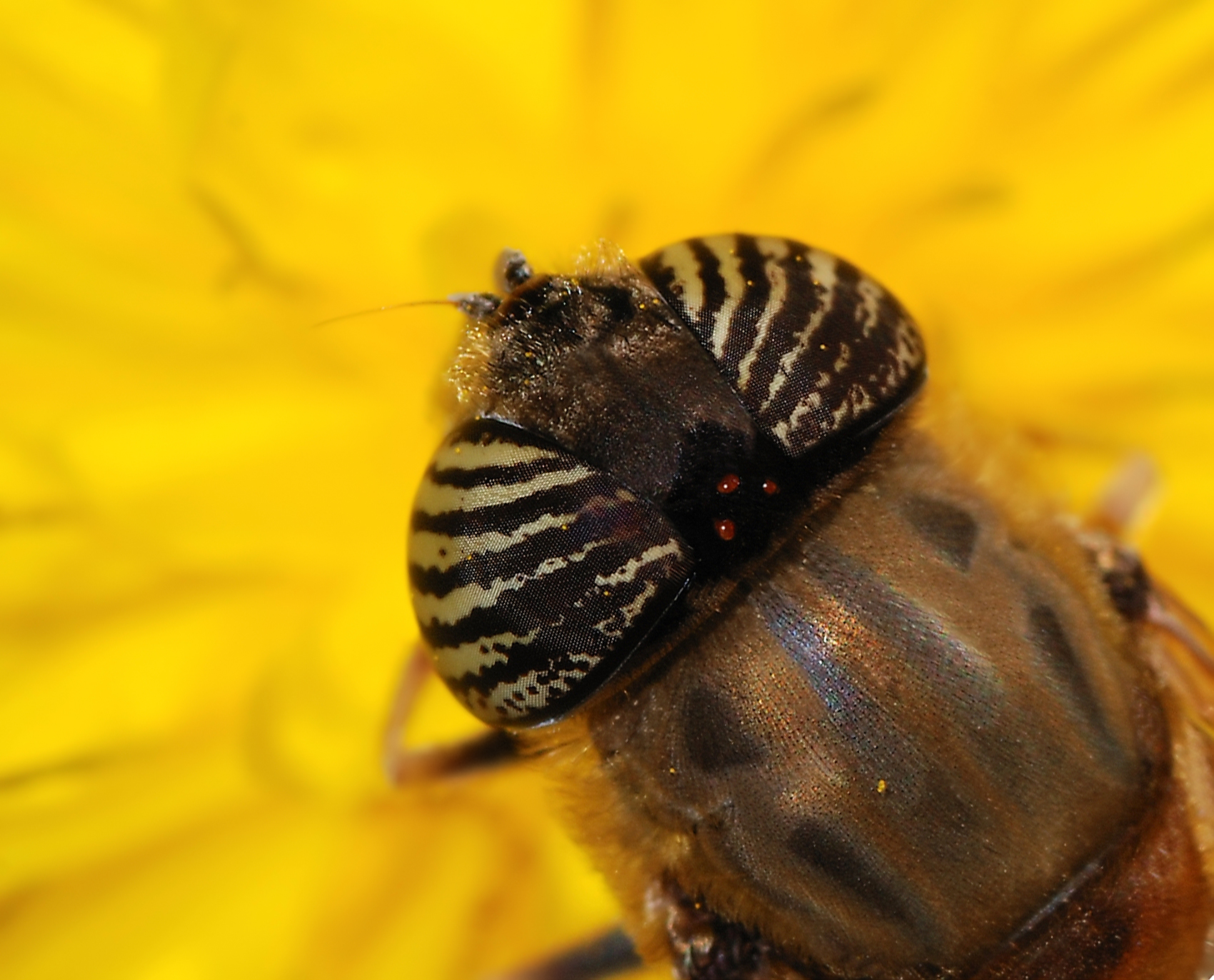
Female eyes (Close-up)

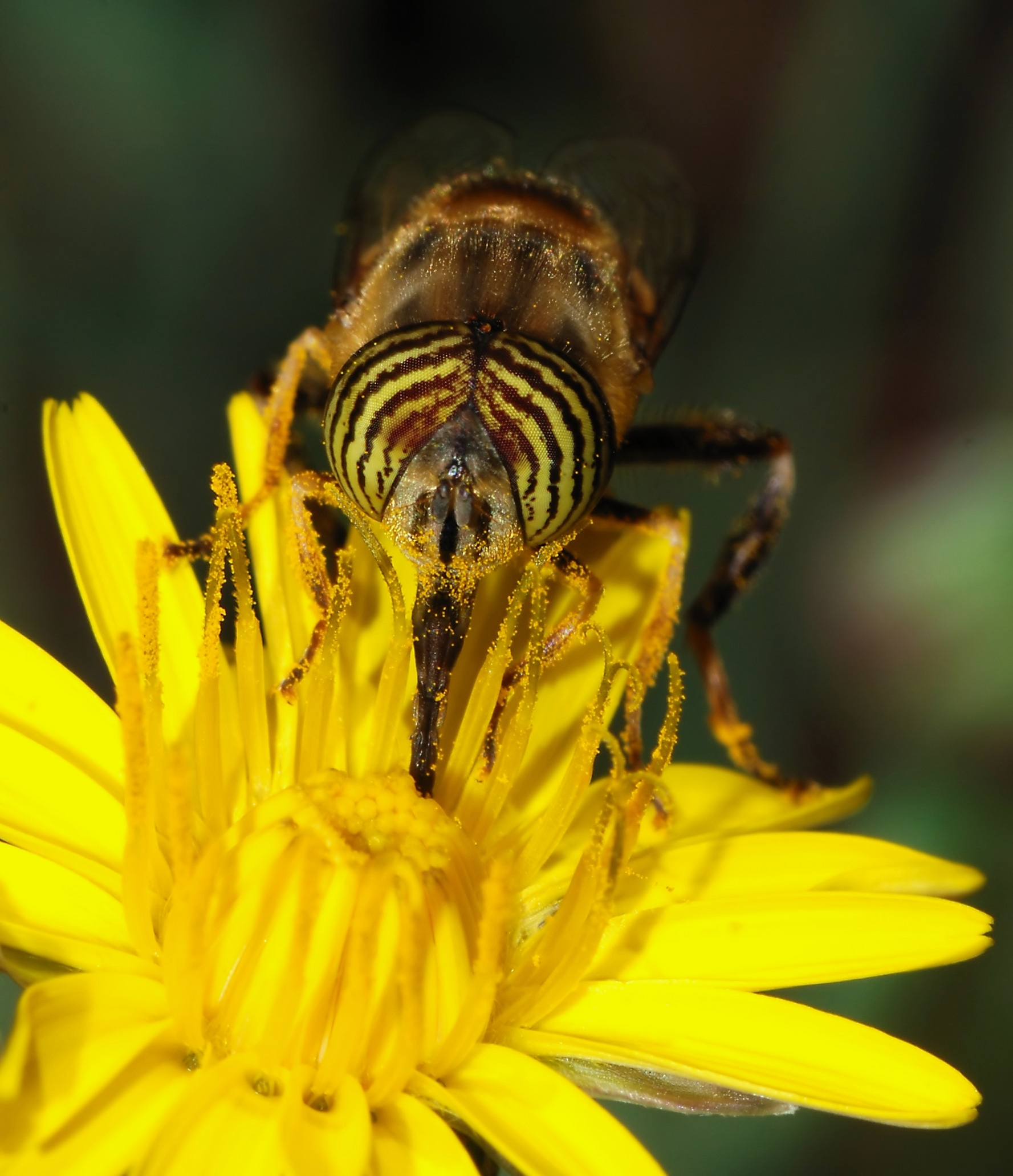
"Picture of the day" award winner Alvesgaspar

== Bibliography ==
- Joachim & Hiroko Haupt: Fliegen und Mücken: Beobachtung, Lebensweise. Naturbuch-Verlag, Augsburg 1998, ISBN 3-89440-278-4.
- Ricarte, Antonio & M. Á. Marcos-García. 2017. A checklist of the Syrphidae (Diptera) of Spain, Andorra and Gibraltar. Zootaxa 4216(5): 401–440
- Speight, M.C.D. (2014) Species accounts of European Syrphidae (Diptera), 2014. Syrph the Net, the database of European Syrphidae, vol. 78, 321 pp., Syrph the Net publications, Dublin.
- Celeste Pérez Bañón, Santos Rojo, Gunilla Ståhls and M. Angeles Marcos-García – Taxonomy of European Eristalinus (Diptera: Syrphidae) based on larval morphology and molecular data
