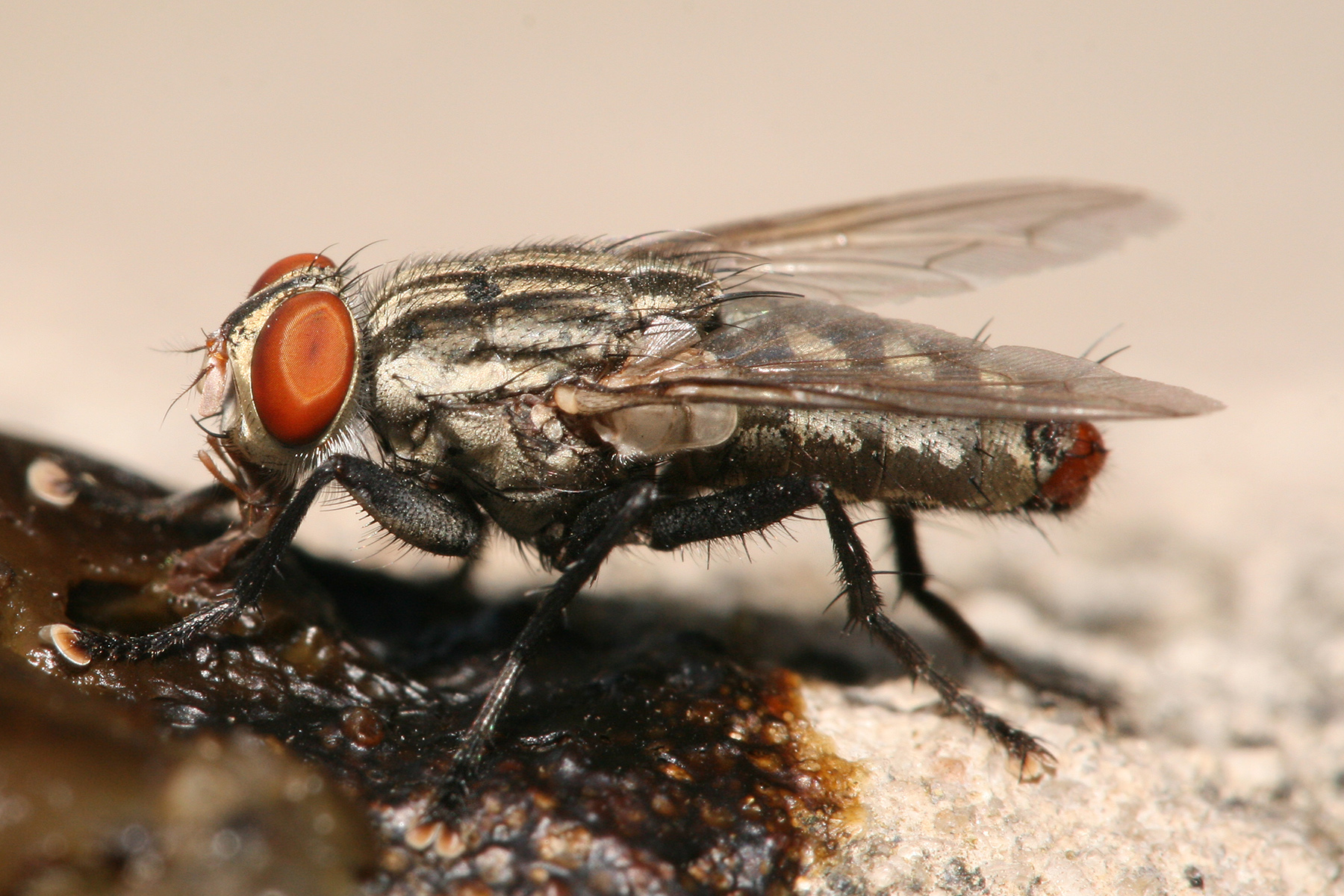

Scientific classification
- Kingdom: Animalia
- Phylum: Arthropoda
- Class: Insecta
- Order: Diptera
- Clade: Eremoneura
- (unranked): Cyclorrhapha
- Section: Schizophora
- Subsection: Calyptratae

Superfamilies
- Muscoidea; Oestroidea; Hippoboscoidea

= Calyptratae =

Calyptratae Temporal range: Eocene–Recent

Subsection of flies

Calyptratae is a subsection of Schizophora in the insect order Diptera, commonly referred to as the calyptrate muscoids (or simply calyptrates). It consists of those flies which possess a calypter that covers the halteres, among which are some of the most familiar of all flies, such as the house fly.

About 18,000 described species are in this group, or about 12% of all the flies yet described.

== Subsection ==
- Superfamily Muscoidea
  Anthomyiidae - cabbage flies
  Fanniidae
  Muscidae - house flies
  Scathophagidae - dung flies
- Superfamily Oestroidea
  Calliphoridae
  Mystacinobiidae
  Oestridae
  Rhinophoridae
  Sarcophagidae
  Tachinidae
  Ulurumyiidae
- Superfamily Hippoboscoidea
  Glossinidae
  Hippoboscidae
  Nycteribiidae
  Streblidae

The Mormotomyiidae belong to the Ephydroidea and not to Hippoboscoidea as previously construed. The Streblidae are probably not monophyletic.
