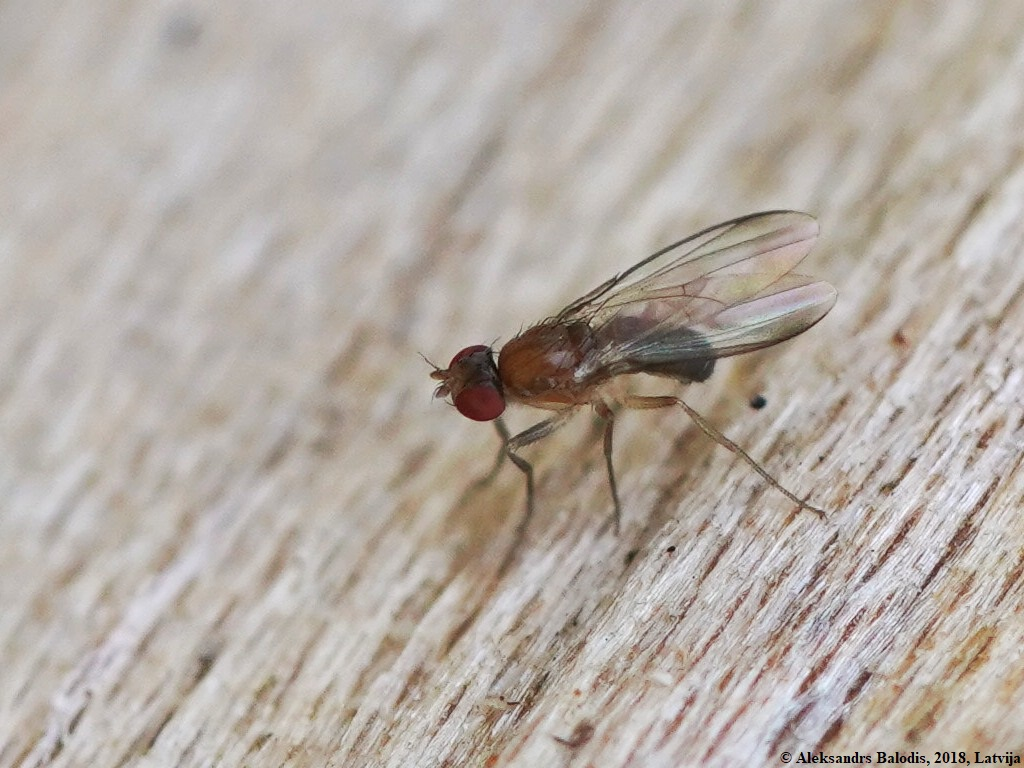

Scientific classification
- Kingdom: Animalia
- Phylum: Arthropoda
- Class: Insecta
- Order: Diptera
- Superfamily: Ephydroidea
- Family: Drosophilidae
- Subfamily: Drosophilinae
- Genus: Chymomyza
- Species: C. fuscimana

Binomial name
- Chymomyza fuscimana (Zetterstedt, 1838)

Synonyms
- Drosophila fuscimana Zetterstedt, 1838; Drosophila albopunctata Becker, 1900

= Chymomyza fuscimana =

Species of fly

Chymomyza fuscimana is a species of fly in the family Drosophilidae. It is found in the Palearctic.
