= Chymomyza costata =

Scientific classification
- Kingdom: Animalia
- Phylum: Arthropoda
- Class: Insecta
- Order: Diptera
- Superfamily: Ephydroidea
- Family: Drosophilidae
- Subfamily: Drosophilinae
- Genus: Chymomyza
- Species: C. costata

Binomial name
- Chymomyza costata (Zetterstedt, 1838)

Synonyms
- Drosophila costata Zetterstedt, 1838

Species of fly

Chymomyza costata is a species of fly in the family Drosophilidae. It is found in the Palearctic.
