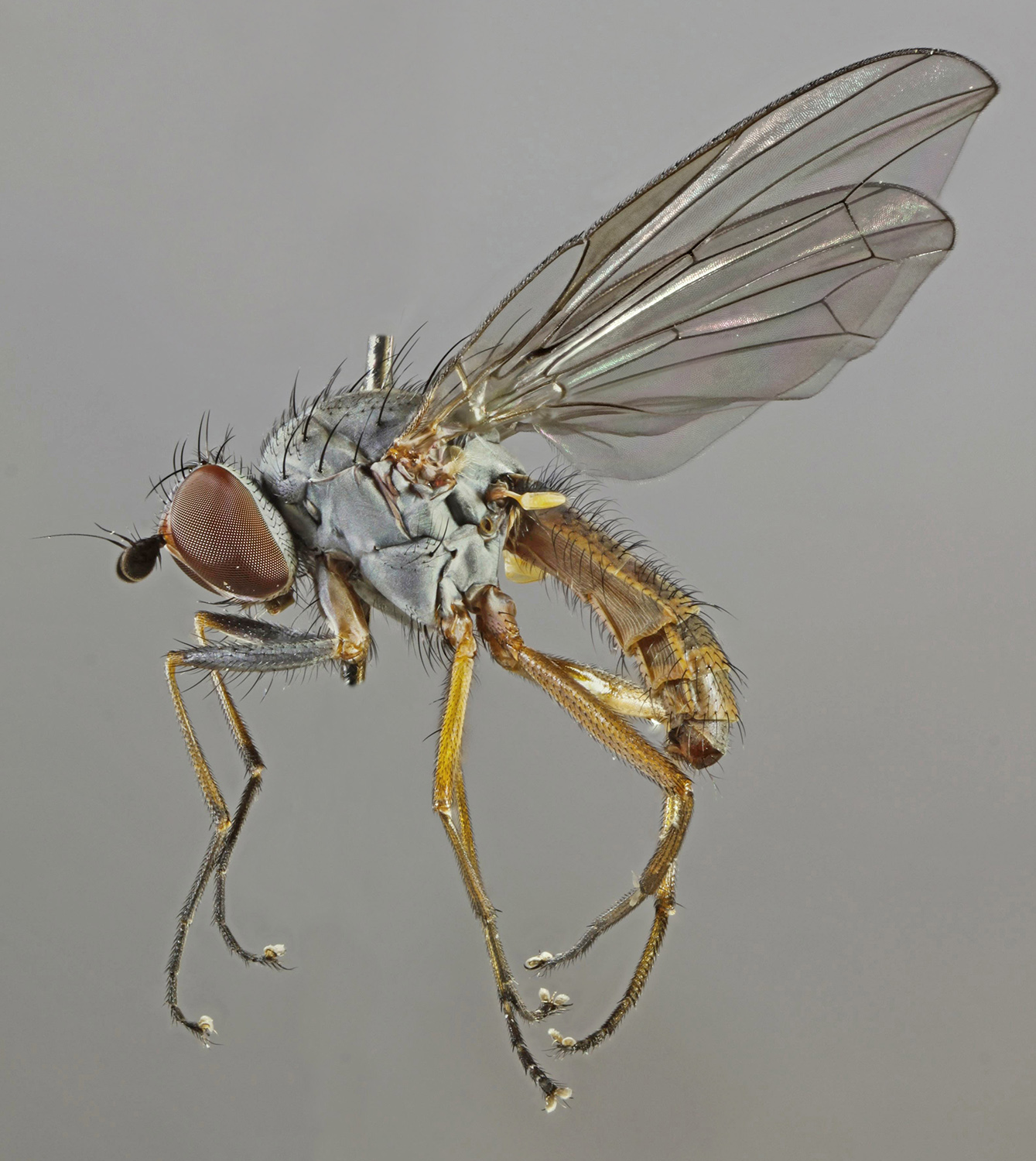
- Heteromyza rotundicornis North Wales

Scientific classification
- Kingdom: Animalia
- Phylum: Arthropoda
- Class: Insecta
- Order: Diptera
- Family: Heleomyzidae
- Genus: Heteromyza
- Species: H. rotundicornis

Binomial name
- Heteromyza rotundicornis (Zetterstedt, 1846)

= Heteromyza rotundicornis =

Species of fly

Heteromyza rotundicornis is a species of fly in the family Heleomyzidae. It is found in the Palearctic.

The body length of 4 to 5.5 mm. The head is characterized by the presence of both hairs and setae on the genae, and in males it is also characterized by a gradually truncated frons, wider in the middle than the face . The thorax is characterized by well-developed presutural dorsocenral setae, the presence of setae on the propleura and a naked prothorax . The wings have long pterostigma and spine-like setae on the costa that are longer than the hairs. The middle pair of legs has one well-developed spur on the tibiae.For terms see Morphology of Diptera. Heteromyza rotundicornis is known from Ireland, Great Britain, Belgium, the Netherlands, Germany, Denmark, Norway, Sweden, Finland, Switzerland, Austria, Poland, the Czech Republic, Slovakia, Hungary and Croatia

Content in this edit is translated from the existing Polish Wikipedia article at pl:Heteromyza rotundicornis; see its history for attribution
