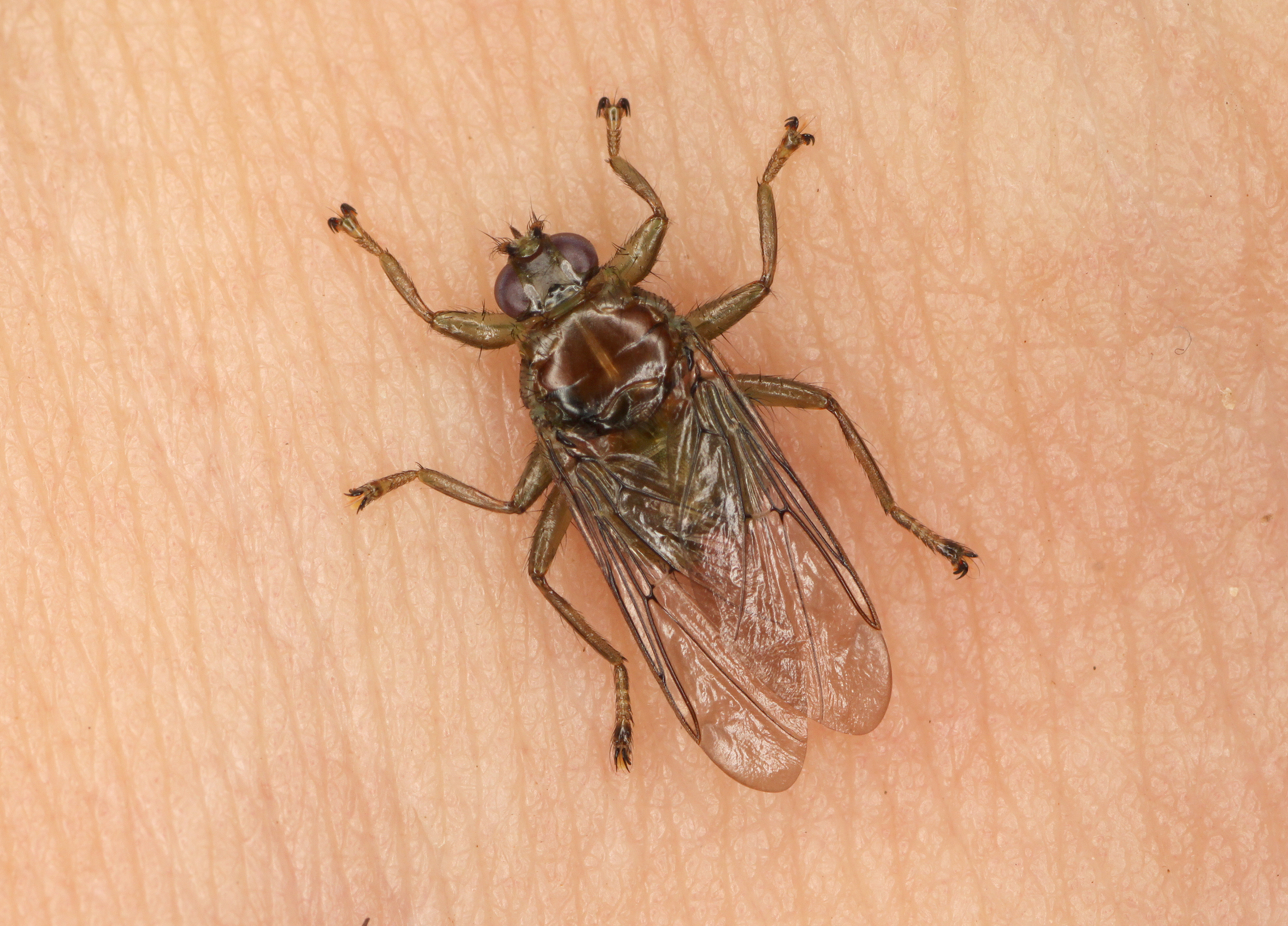
- Bird louse fly (Ornithomya avicularia)

Scientific classification
- Kingdom: Animalia
- Phylum: Arthropoda
- Clade: Pancrustacea
- Class: Insecta
- Order: Diptera
- Clade: Eremoneura
- (unranked): Cyclorrhapha
- Section: Schizophora
- Subsection: Calyptratae
- Superfamily: Hippoboscoidea; Samouelle, 1819

Families
- About 5, see text.

= Hippoboscoidea =

Hippoboscoidea Temporal range: Ypresian–Present

Superfamily of flies

Hippoboscoidea is a superfamily of the Calyptratae. The flies in this superfamily are blood-feeding obligate parasites of their hosts. Four families are often placed here:

- Glossinidae - Tsetse flies
- Hippoboscidae - Ked flies
- Nycteribiidae - Bat flies
- Streblidae - Bat flies

(Note that the Mystacinobiidae, while also a bat fly, belongs to the superfamily Oestroidea).

The Hippoboscidae are commonly called louse flies or ked flies. The bat flies are Nycteribiidae and Streblidae (along with Mystacinobiidae); the Streblidae are probably not monophyletic. The family Glossinidae, monotypic as to genus, contains the tsetse flies, economically important as the vectors of trypanosomiasis. The enigmatic Mormotomyiidae are believed to belong to the Ephydroidea and not to Hippoboscoidea as previously construed.

In older literature, this group is often referred to as the Pupipara ("pupa-bearers"), because, unlike virtually all other insects, most of the larval development takes place inside the mother's body, and pupation occurs almost immediately after "birth" – in essence, instead of laying eggs, a female lays full-sized pupae one at a time. In the strict sense, the Pupipara only encompass the Hippoboscidae, Nycteribiidae, and "Streblidae", which in older works were all included in the Hippoboscidae.

== Development ==
Species of the Hippoboscoidea do not lay eggs. Instead, the larvae hatch in utero, are fed internally by "milk glands," and pass through three morphological stages before being deposited to pupate. This type of reproduction is termed as adenotrophic viviparity.
