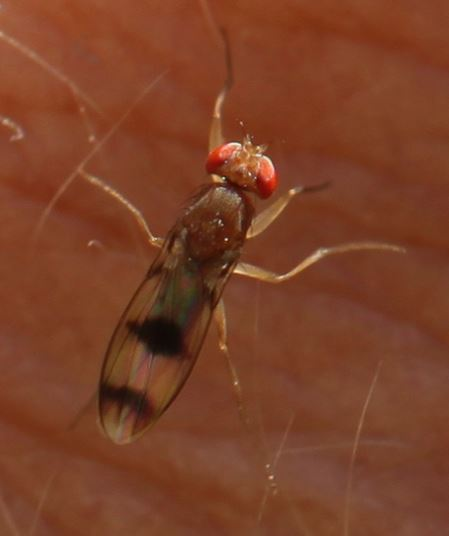
- Chymomyza amoena

Scientific classification
- Domain: Eukaryota
- Kingdom: Animalia
- Phylum: Arthropoda
- Class: Insecta
- Order: Diptera
- Superfamily: Ephydroidea
- Family: Drosophilidae
- Subfamily: Drosophilinae
- Genus: Chymomyza; Czerny, 1903

Synonyms
- Amphoroneura Meijere, 1911; Protochymomyza Grimaldi, 1987; Zygodrosophila Hendel, 1917; Zyogdrosophila Duda, 1927; Zygrodrosophila Duda, 1927; Chymomgza Duda, 1927; Chymomyza Czerny, 1903

= Chymomyza =

Genus of flies

Chymomyza is a genus of vinegar flies (insects in the family Drosophilidae).

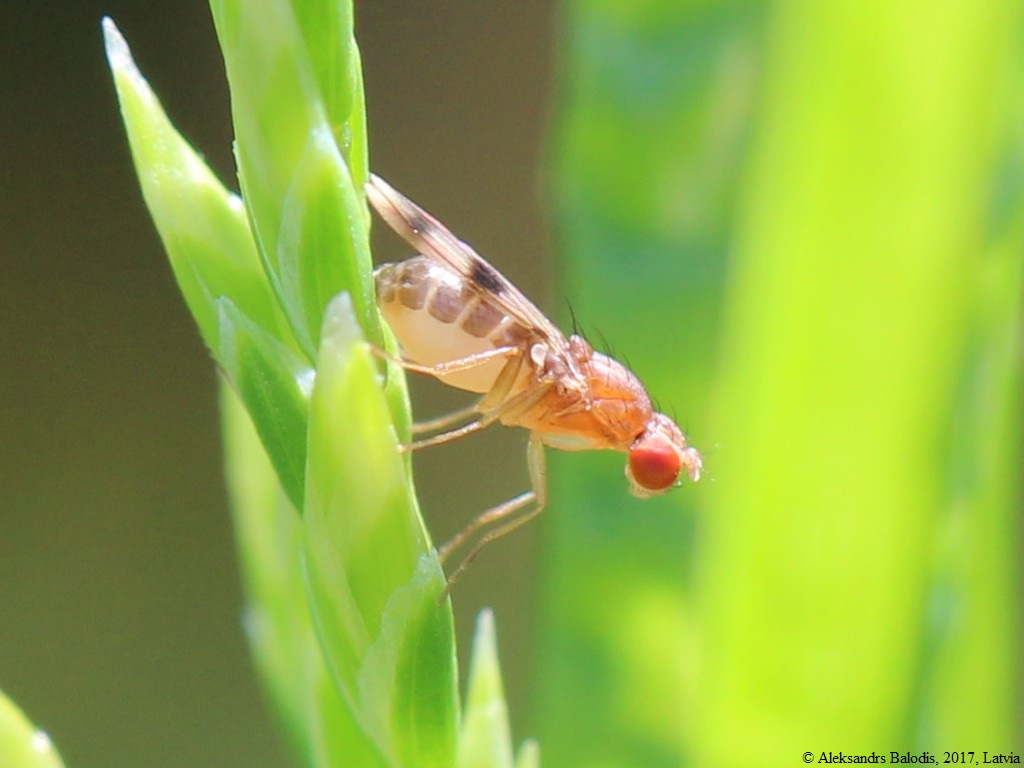
Chymomyza amoena

== Species ==
- C. albitarsis (Hendel, 1917)
- C. aldrichii Sturtevant, 1916
- C. amoena (Loew, 1862)
- C. atrimana Okada, 1956
- C. avikam Burla, 1954
- C. bambara Burla, 1954
- C. bicolor Lamb, 1914
- C. bicoloripes (Malloch, 1926)
- C. brevis Okada, 1981
- C. caudatula Oldenberg, 1914
- C. cinctifrons Meijere, 1924
- C. clavata Okada, 1981
- C. costata (Zetterstedt, 1838)
- C. coxata Wheeler, 1952
- C. demae Watabe & Liang, 1990
- C. diatropa Grimaldi, 1986
- C. distincta (Egger, 1862)
- C. eungellae Bock, 1982
- C. exophthalma Grimaldi, 1986
- C. femorata Okada, 1981
- C. flabellata Okada, 1981
- C. flagellata Okada, 1981
- C. formosana Okada, 1976
- C. fuscimana (Zetterstedt, 1838)
- C. guyanensis Grimaldi, 1986
- C. jamaicensis Grimaldi, 1986
- C. japonica Okada, 1956
- C. laevilimbata Duda, 1927
- C. lahu Burla, 1954
- C. longicauda Okada, 1981
- C. maculipennis Hendel, 1936
- C. mafu Burla, 1954
- C. mesopecta Wheeler, 1968
- C. mexicana Wheeler, 1949
- C. microdiopsis Grimaldi, 1986
- C. mycopelates Grimaldi, 1986
- C. nigrimanus (Meigen, 1830)
- C. nigripes Okada, 1981
- C. novobscura Watabe & Liang, 1991
- C. obscura (Meijere, 1911)
- C. obscuroides Okada, 1976
- C. oldenbergi Duda, 1934
- C. olympia Wheeler, 1960
- C. pararufithorax Vaidya & Godbole, 1973
- C. pectinifemur Duda, 1927
- C. perarufithorax Vaidya & Godbole, 1973
- C. poena Bock, 1982
- C. primaeva Grimaldi, 1987
- C. procnemis (Williston, 1896)
- C. procnemoides Wheeler, 1952
- C. procnemolita Grimaldi, 1986
- C. rufa Okada, 1981
- C. rufithorax (Meijere, 1911)
- C. scutellata Okada, 1981
- C. subobscura Okada, 1981
- C. taiwanica Lin & Wheeler, 1977
- C. tetonensis Wheeler, 1949
- C. vaidyai Okada, 1976
- C. wirthi Wheeler, 1954
- C. xanthosoma Lin & Wheeler, 1977
- C. yvettae Tsacas, 1990
