= Chymomyza procnemoides =

Scientific classification
- Domain: Eukaryota
- Kingdom: Animalia
- Phylum: Arthropoda
- Class: Insecta
- Order: Diptera
- Family: Drosophilidae
- Genus: Chymomyza
- Species: C. procnemoides

Binomial name
- Chymomyza procnemoides Wheeler, 1952

Species of fly

Chymomyza procnemoides is a species of fruit fly in the family Drosophilidae. It is found in Europe.
