= Heteromyza oculata =

Scientific classification
- Domain: Eukaryota
- Kingdom: Animalia
- Phylum: Arthropoda
- Class: Insecta
- Order: Diptera
- Family: Heleomyzidae
- Genus: Heteromyza
- Species: H. oculata

Binomial name
- Heteromyza oculata Fallén, 1820

Synonyms
- Heteromyza eriphides Walker, 1849; Heteromyza flavipes Walker, 1849

Species of fly

Heteromyza oculata is a species of fly in the family Heleomyzidae. It is found in Europe and North America. Males of this species have much larger eyes than females.
