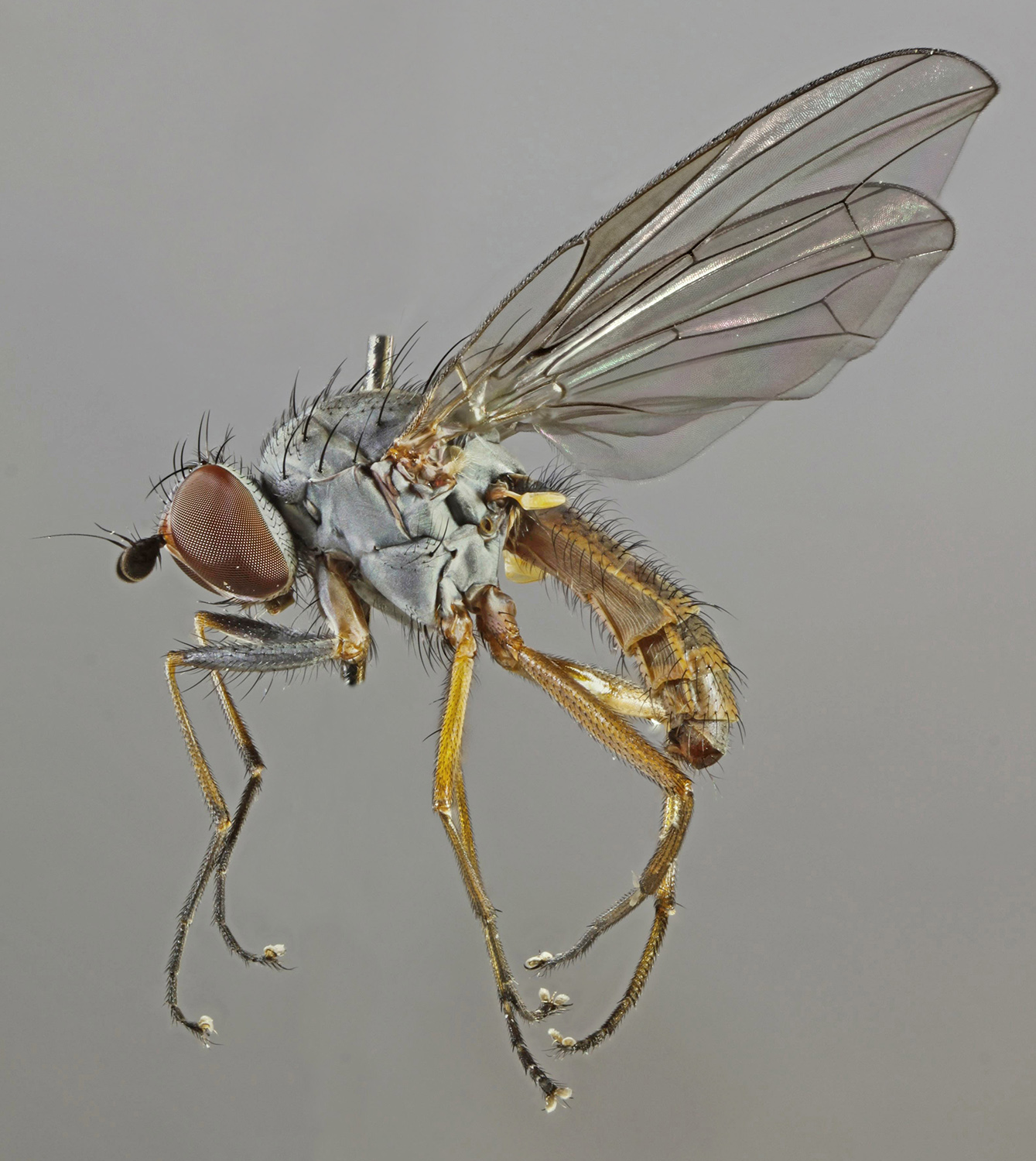
- Heteromyza rotundicornis

Scientific classification
- Domain: Eukaryota
- Kingdom: Animalia
- Phylum: Arthropoda
- Class: Insecta
- Order: Diptera
- Family: Heleomyzidae
- Subfamily: Heteromyzinae
- Genus: Heteromyza; Fallén, 1820

Synonyms
- Thelida Robineau-Desvoidy, 1830

= Heteromyza =

Genus of flies

Heteromyza is a genus of flies in the family Heleomyzidae. There are at least four described species in Heteromyza.

== Species ==
These four species belong to the genus Heteromyza:

- Heteromyza atricornis Meigen, 1830^{c g}
- Heteromyza commixta Collin, 1901^{c g}
- Heteromyza oculata Fallén, 1820^{i c g b}
- Heteromyza rotundicornis (Zetterstedt, 1846)^{c g}

Data sources: i = ITIS, c = Catalogue of Life, g = GBIF, b = Bugguide.net
