= Chymomyza aldrichii =

Scientific classification
- Domain: Eukaryota
- Kingdom: Animalia
- Phylum: Arthropoda
- Class: Insecta
- Order: Diptera
- Family: Drosophilidae
- Genus: Chymomyza
- Species: C. aldrichii

Binomial name
- Chymomyza aldrichii Sturtevant, 1916

Synonyms
- Chymomyza tetonensis Wheeler, 1949; Chymomyza aldrichi Hsu, 1949

Species of fly

Chymomyza aldrichii is a species of vinegar fly in the family Drosophilidae.
