= Morphology of Diptera =

Physical features of insect order Diptera

Dipteran morphology differs in some significant ways from the broader morphology of insects. The Diptera is a very large and diverse order of mostly small to medium-sized insects. They have prominent compound eyes on a mobile head, and (at most) one pair of functional, membraneous wings, which are attached to a complex mesothorax. The second pair of wings, on the metathorax, are reduced to halteres. The order's fundamental peculiarity is its remarkable specialization in terms of wing shape and the morpho-anatomical adaptation of the thorax – features which lend particular agility to its flying forms. The filiform, stylate or aristate antennae correlate with the Nematocera, Brachycera and Cyclorrhapha taxa respectively. It displays substantial morphological uniformity in lower taxa, especially at the level of genus or species. The configuration of integumental bristles is of fundamental importance in their taxonomy, as is wing venation. It displays a complete metamorphosis (egg, larva, pupa, adult), or holometabolous development. The larvae are legless, and have head capsules with mandibulate mouthparts in the Nematocera. The larvae of "higher flies" (Brachycera) are however headless and wormlike, and display only three instars. Pupae are obtect in the Nematocera, or coarcate in Brachycera.

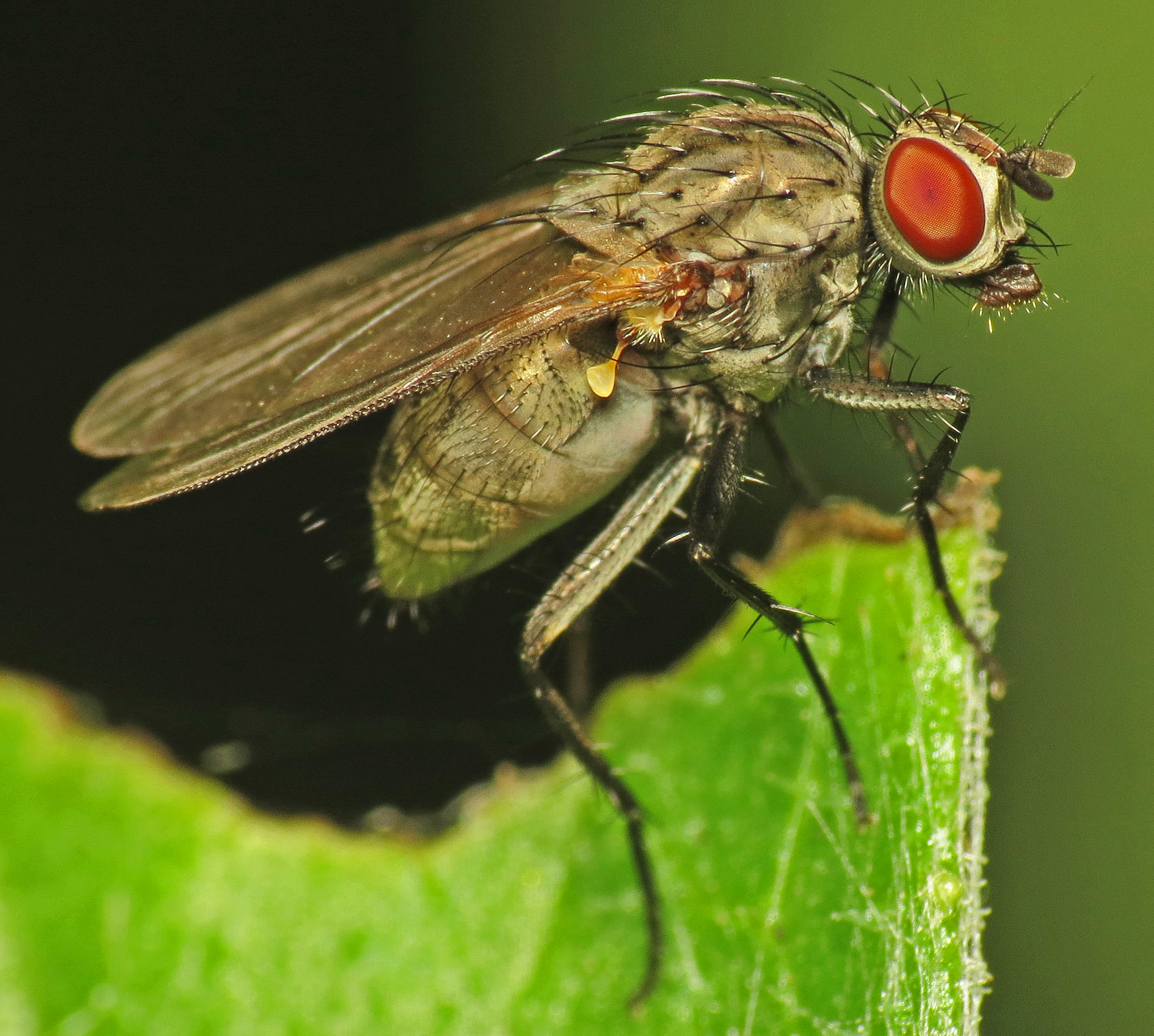
An Anthomyiid species showing characteristic dipteran features: large eyes, small antennae, sucking mouthparts, single pair of flying wings, hindwings reduced to clublike halteres

== Adult ==
Schematic of muscoid dipteran anatomy
I: head; II: thorax; III: abdomen

1: prescutum; 2: anterior spiracle (stigma); 3: scutum; 4: basicosta; 5: calyptra; 6: scutellum; 7: alary nerve (costa); 8: ala; 9: urite; 10: haltere; 11: posterior spiracle (stigma); 12: femora; 13: tibia; 14: spur; 15: tarsus; 16: propleura; 17: prosternum; 18: mesopleura; 19: mesosternum; 20: metapleura; 21: metasternum; 22: compound eye; 23: arista; 24: antenna; 25: maxillary palpi; 26: labrum (inferiore); 27: labellum; 28: pseudotrachae; 29: tip.

Adults are small (< 2 millimetres (5/64 in)) to medium-sized insects (- < 10 millimetres (25/64 in)). Larger Diptera are rare, only certain families of Diptera Mydidae and Pantophthalmidae reach 95–100 millimetres (3 3/4–4 in) wingspan while tropical species of Tipulidae have been recorded at over 100 millimetres (4 in). They have dull or bright colors, uniform or variegated and are sometimes mimetic such as in Syrphidae. Of fundamental importance, for taxonomy, is the presence and distribution of the attached integumental bristles.

=== External ===
==== Head ====
Head morphology of a muscoid dipteran (schematic representation) 1: labellum; 2: lower lip (labium), 3: maxillary palp, 4: upper lip (labrum); 5: subgenal area; 6: clypeus; 7: fronto-orbital area; 8: fronto-orbital bristles; 9: outer vertical bristle; 10: inner vertical bristle; 11: postocellar bristles (postvertical bristles in old literature); 12: ocelli; 13: ocellar bristles; 14: compound eye; 15: Frontal suture or ptilinal suture; 16: antenna; 17: arista; 18: vibrissa.

The head is distinct from the thorax, with a marked narrowing at the neck. In "lower flies" (Nematocera), it is prognathous (head horizontally oriented with the mouth anterior), in "higher flies" (Brachycera) it is hypognathous (head vertically oriented with the mouth ventral). The shape of the cranial capsule also varies. In the Nematocera, the dorsal–ventral part of the head extends forward from the eyes due to the development in length of the clypeus and subgenal area (subgena), the distal end of the extension is the 'mouthparts'.

Head orientation

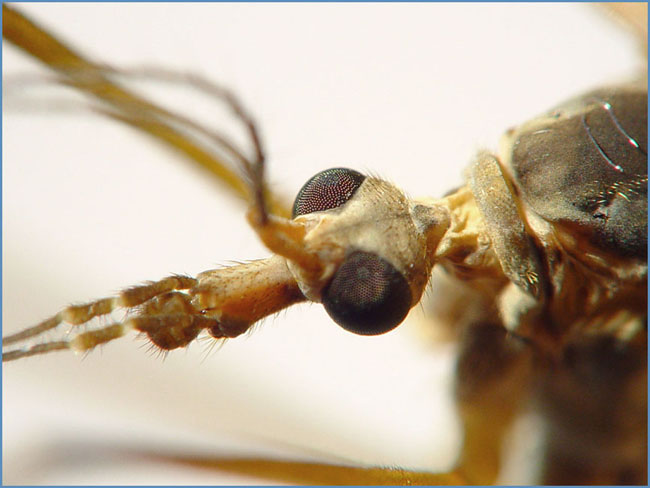
Nematocera: Tipulidae. Prognathous (mouth anterior)

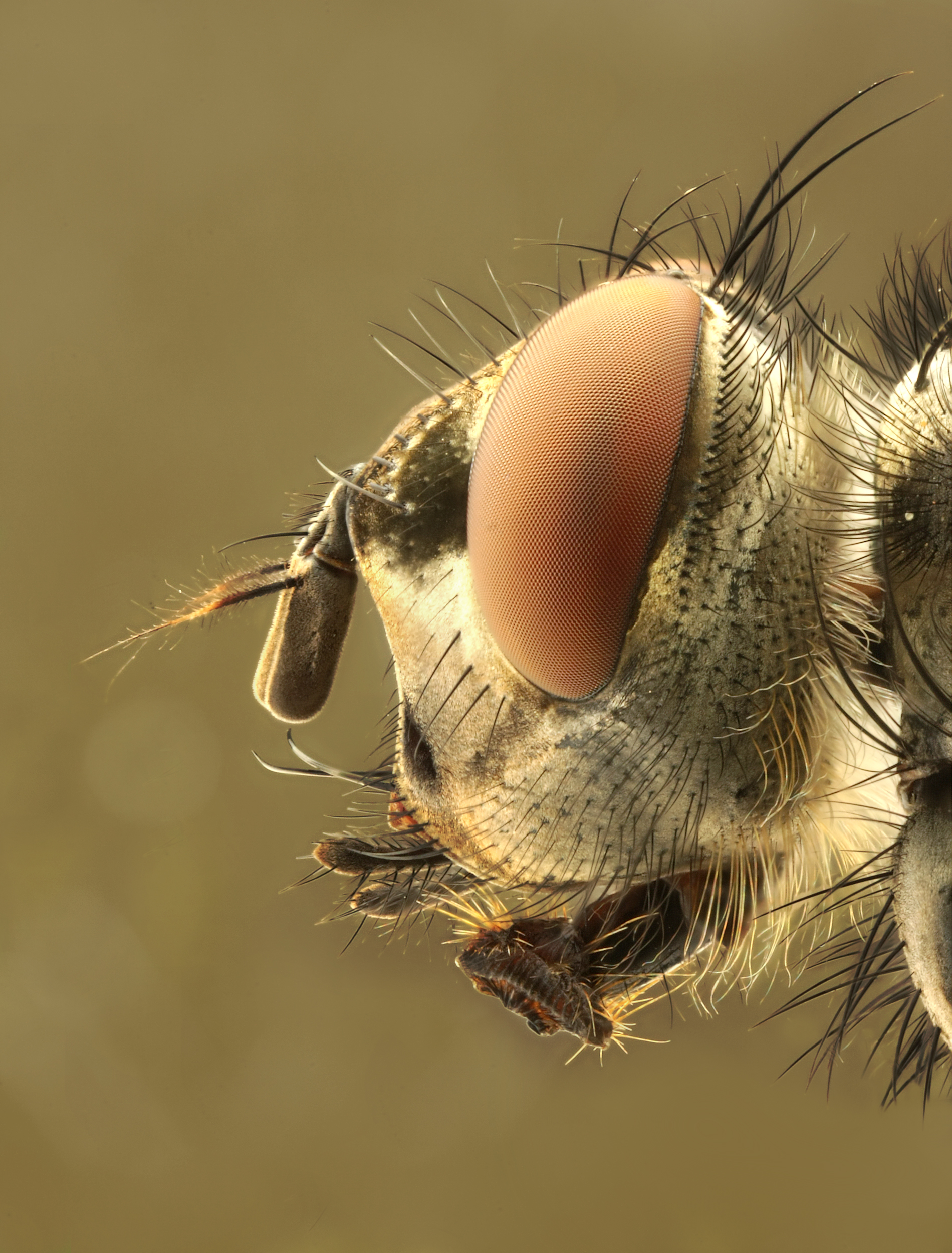
Brachycera: Calliphoridae. Hypognathous (mouth ventral)

In the "higher" Diptera the head has a subglobose shape and the fronto-clypeus is an area bounded superiorly by the eyes and the vertex. In Cyclorrhapha Schizophora, a morphological element of particular importance is the presence of the ptilinal suture formed by the resorption of the ptilinum after emergence from the pupa. The suture separates two regions: 1. the upper one is the frontal region, which has continuity with the apex, the orbital region and the gena, 2. the lower one, the face or clypeus, contains the insertion of the antennae and ends with the epistomal edge which comprises the upper lip.

The eyes are usually very obvious, but reach a remarkable development in the Brachycera. In this suborder the eyes are markedly convex and have grown to occupy most of the side of the head. The space between the two eyes can sometimes be reduced to a narrow strip running from the front of the occipital region, or disappear altogether because of the direct contact between the eyes or their margins. The morphology of the compound eye is characterized by a significant number of ommatidia, of the order of thousands in muscoids. The ocelli, when present, are located in the top of the head, arranged at the corners of a triangle in an area called stemmaticum or ocellar triangle.

For the purpose of systematics, the presence, the arrangement, and the conformation of the cephalic bristles is important and they have a specific terminology. Bristles on the head are: frontal bristles, sometimes named lower orbital bristles are located on the frontal plates of the frons resembling a small alley extending from the base of the antennae toward the vertex and edging the median frontal stripe laterally. Sometimes they are situated lower, along the frontalia below the antennal attachment and over a greater or lesser distance. Orbital bristles are located on the vertex plates of the frons and usually restricted to its upper half. They may be arranged in longitudinal rows named inner and outerorbital bristles. (The frontal and vertex plates of the frons can be visualised on the basis of the arrangement of the frontal and orbital bristles); ocellar bristles are located on the vertex between the ocelli; outer and inner vertical bristles are located on the border between the vertex and the occiput and near the upper corner of the eyes; postvertical bristles are located behind the ocelli on the occiput near the median line of the head; vibrissae usually arrayed in small numbers along the facial sections of the arcuate suture, near the margin of the oral cavity; sometimes they ascend along the suture over a greater or lesser distance, occasionally almost to the place of antennal attachment; false vibrissae-bristles are placed along the margin of the oral cavity.

Sometimes the terminology is conflicting. For instance in the Acalyptratae there are usually two bristles, more or less strong, positioned along the posterior margin of the ocellar triangle. These bristles are called "postvertical bristles" in old literature, since the nineteenth century, and the term is used sometimes in the recent literature. Steyskal (1976) proposed the name "postocellar bristle" the adopted term in the Manual of Nearctic Diptera (McAlpine, J.F., 1981) and the Manual of Palaearctic Diptera (Bernhard Merz, Jean-Paul Haenni, 2000) and, therefore, this term occurs widely in the literature that refers to these two fundamental works. Two other bristles, present only in some families of Acalyptratae, are located posteriorly and laterally to the ocellar triangle, and are called "internal occipital" in old literature. Steyskal (1976) uses the name "paravertical bristles" and the same name is used in the basic nomenclature of the two manuals cited. In Russian the lateral parts of the frons are termed 'orbits'. In English this part is most commonly termed 'frontalia', 'parafrontalia', or 'frontal orbit', while the simple term 'orbit' refers to the margin of the compound eye. The median part of the lower head, or face, often bears in its lower corners a pair (or a few pairs) of large seta (bristles) called 'vibrissae' and sometimes several or even a complete series along a ridge extending upward from the vibrissae. The latter setae are in Russian texts also called vibrissal bristles, not facial bristles.

The antennae are divided into two basic morphological types that are the basis of the distinction between the two suborders. All fly antennae consist of three sections: the scape, the pedicel, and the flagellum. Intrinsic muscles are only found in the scape and pedicel. In Nematocera, they are pluriarticulate, threadlike or of feathery type, composed of 7-15 undifferentiated items. In Brachycera the antennae consist of up to six segments, of which the first three are well-developed. In most of the Brachycera families, the third segment is enlarged and the more apical segments are reduced to an appendage — called a stylus when rigid and an arista when bristle-like.

The insect mouthparts show, according to the systematic group, a variety of conformations. Mouthparts are modified and combined into a sucking proboscis, which is highly variable in structure. The ancestral condition is the piercing and sucking type proboscis, more modified proboscis forms variously rasp or sponge fluids. The labellum is one such sponging organ. Some species have non-functional adult mouthparts.

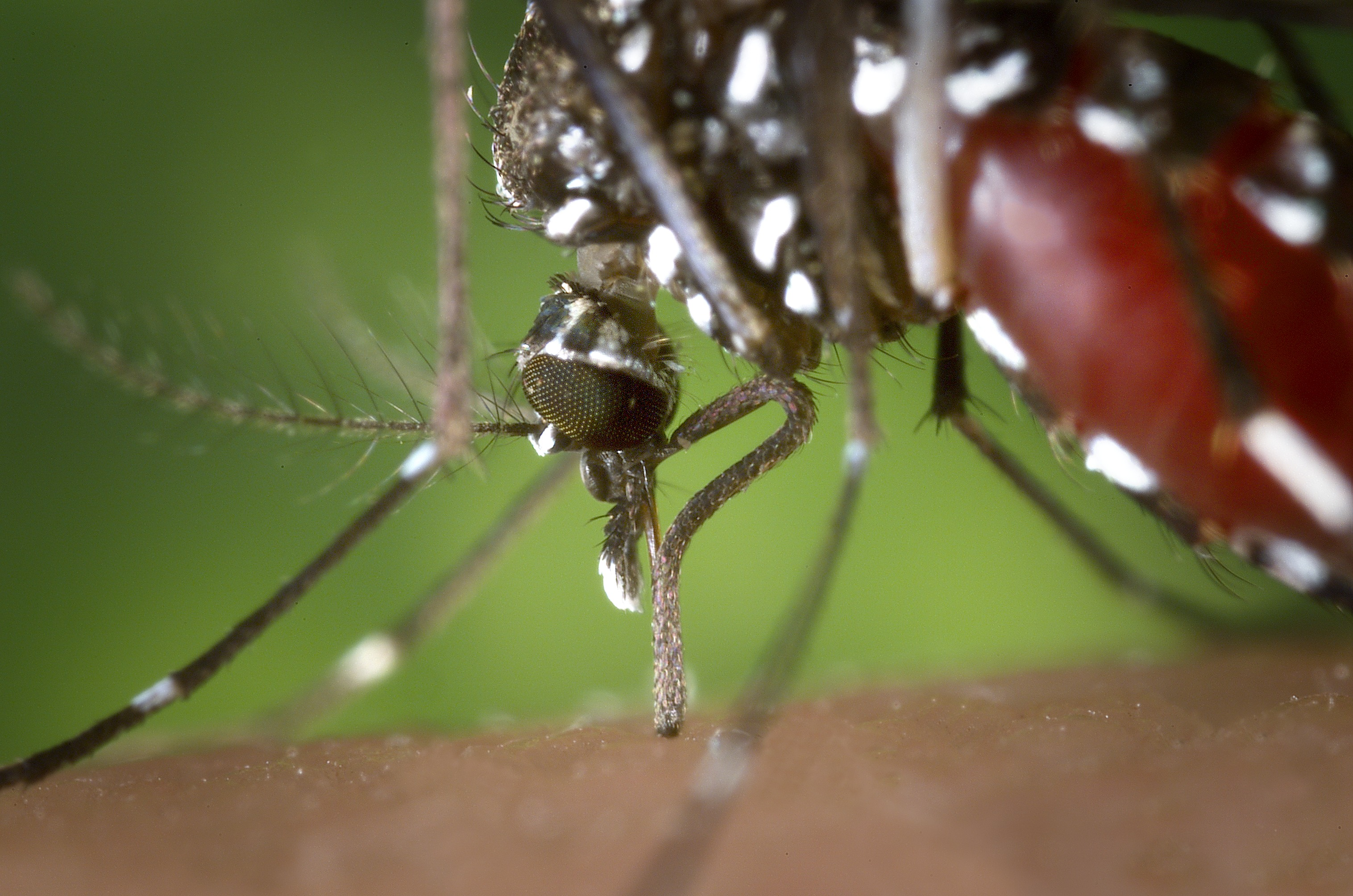
Nematocera: Culicidae head. Feathery filamentous antennae, piercing suction mouth parts

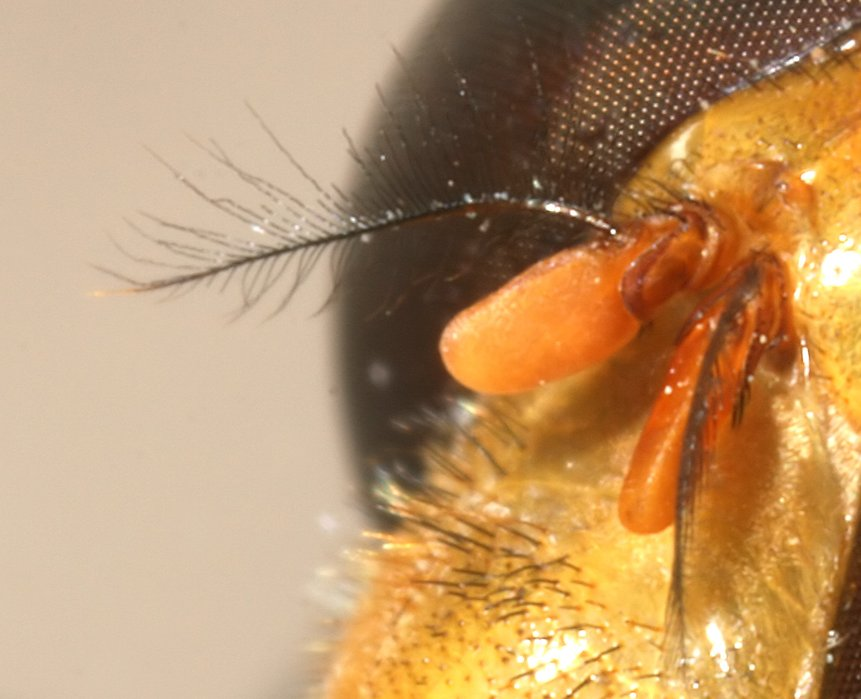
Brachycera: Muscoidea. Antenna with arista

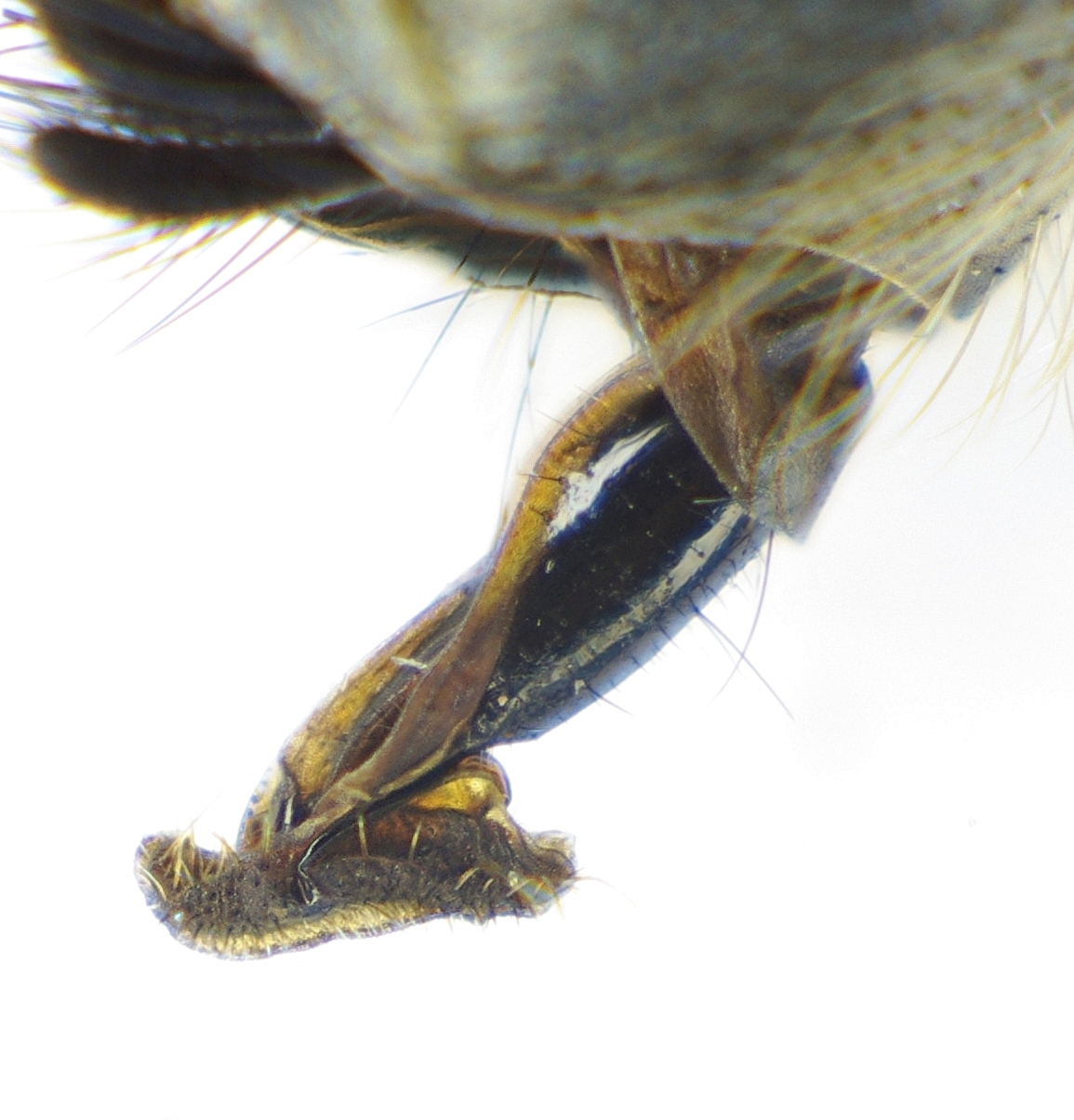
Brachycera: Muscoidea. Sucking mouthparts

==== Thorax ====
Thorax morphology of a muscoid dipteran
right lateral (left), dorsal (right)

1: mesoprescutum; 2: humeral callus; 3: notopleuron; 4: mesoscutum; 5: posterior callus; 6: mesoscutellum; 7: tansverse suture trasversa; 8: postscutellum; 9: metanotum; 10: wingbase; 11: mesopleuro-tergite or laterotergite or katatergite; 12: haltere; 13: stigma; 14: metapleuron; 15: metacoxa; 16: hypopleuron or meron; 17: mesocoxa; 18: epimeral suture; 19: mesoepimeron or anepimeron; 20: ventral mesoepisternum or katepisterno; 21: suture episterno-precoxale; 22: procoxa; 23: pleural suture; 24: dorsal mesoepisternum or anepisterno; 25: propleuron.

Chaetotaxy (bristles): a: acrostical; dc: dorsocentral; ph: posthumeral; om: humeral; ps: presutural; np: notopleural; ia: intralar (postsutural); sa: supralar (postsutural); pa: postalar; psct: scutellar.

McAlpine terminology vs. other terminology
Equivalents are:– postpronotum = humeral callus or humerus; anepisternum = mesopleuron; proepisternum = propleuron; proepimeron = no equivalent; anepimeron = pteropleuron; katepisternum = sternopleuron; katepimeron = no equivalent; meron = hypopleuron; greater ampulla = no equivalent; laterotergite = no equivalent; mediotergite = no equivalent; postpronotum = humeral callus or humerus; anepisternum = mesopleuron; proepisternum = propleuron; proepimeron = no equivalent; anepimeron = pteropleuron; katepisternum = sternopleuron; katepimeron = no equivalent; meron = hypopleuron; greater ampulla = no equivalent; laterotergite = no equivalent; mediotergite = no equivalent

===== Taxonomically important bristles on the thorax =====
Notum: 1. prescutum, 2. scutum, 3. scutellum Pleuron: 4. propleuron, 5. mesopleuron, 6. metapleuron Sternum: 7. prosternum, 8. mesosternum, 9. metasternum

- acrostical (a) bristles adjacent to the median longitudinal axis of the scutum. They may be irregular or align in two or more rows. The number of rows, the number of setae in each row, the size and the thickness are significant. In many groups, the acrostical setae are replaced by setulae or hairs.
- prescutellar (psc) two acrostical bristles, more developed than the other acrosticals, inserted in front of the scutoscutellar suture.
- dorsocentral (dc) these bristles are aligned along two rows adjacent to and outside the acrosticals.
- posthumeral (ph) bristles aligned in the presutural area and parallel to the suture which separates the scutum from the humeral calli.
- humeral (hm) sometimes called postpronotal bristles are on the humeral calli.
- presutural (ps)
- notopleural (np) bristles on the notopleuron
- intralar (postsutural) (ia) more or less regularly aligned bristles near the dorsocentral series. The position is not well defined.
- supralar (postsutural) (sa) these setae are limited in number, and located from the prealar callus to the supralar area.
- postalar (pa) limited in number, they are located on the postalar callus near the lateral margin of the scutum behind the insertion of the wing.
- scutellar (psct) bristles on the scutellum. They may be marginal or on the dorsal side of the scutellum (called the disc).

The chaetotaxy of the pleura is also of taxonomic significance. The characters taken into consideration are presence or absence, the number, and the position of setae and groups of hairs on the

- anepisternum or mesopleuron – anepisternal or mesopleural bristles
- katepisternum or sternopleuron – katepisternal or sternopleural bristles
- proepisternum and proepimeron – proepisternal and proepimeral bristles, or propleural bristles
- anepimeron (pteropleuron) – anepimeral or pteropleural bristles
- meron (hypopleuron) – meral or hypopleural bristles.

The fundamental peculiarity of the Diptera is the remarkable evolutionary specialization achieved in the shape of the wings and the morpho-anatomical adaptation of the thorax. Except for infrequent wingless forms, the Diptera are usually winged and use the wings as the principal means of locomotion.

==== The wings ====
The level of specialization – anatomical, functional and morphological – is such that in general these insects fly, often exceptionally, well, with particular reference to agility. All Diptera are equipped with only one pair of functional wings, which are on the mesothorax (front). The wings on the metathorax are transformed into the halteres or rocker arms. From this characteristic comes the name of the order, from the Greek dipteros, which means "two wings". In consequence of this morphological structure, the mesothorax represents the segment of greater development and complexity, while the prothorax and metathorax are considerably reduced.

The halteres are club-shaped organs, used to balance the insect in flight, consisting of a proximal portion connected to a mechano-sensory organ. The homology between the wings and halteres is demonstrated by the four-winged mutant of the fruit fly Drosophila melanogaster. The development of the halteres varies according to the systematic group: in the Tipulidae are they are thin but long and clearly visible, but are usually hidden by the wings in most other groups. In Calyptratae which includes the most advanced Diptera, the halteres are protected by calyptrae (small membranes above the halteres).

The mesothoracic wing is entirely membranous, completely transparent and colourless, or bearing zonal pigmentation useful for recognition. Its surface is divided into three regions: the most developed is the alar (main flight) region, supported by robust wing veins; posteriorly is the anal region; and, finally, in the rear section-proximal, there is an expanded lobiform alula. The alula also termed the axillary lobe is a broad lobe at the proximal posterior margin of the wing stalk. It is continuous with the upper calypter and distally it is (usually) separated from the wing by an indentation called the alular incision. Aluli are a newly acquired feature of the Diptera (Hennig, 1973) and aluli are usually absent or poorly developed in the Nematocera (excepting Anisopodidae) but present and relatively large in the Brachycera. In higher Diptera between the alula and the thorax is the upper calyptra, also the tegula. The calyptra are just below the junction of the wing with the thorax and are part of the axillary membrane of the wings of some Diptera – the two basal lobes are called the calypteres (also termed squamae, squamulae). The proximal lobe is called the lower calypter (or basicalypter or squamula thoracica). It arises from the furrow between the scutellum and the postnotum as a narrow, membranous ligament and ends where the more distal lobe, termed the upper calypter (or disticalypter or squamula alaris), folds sharply over it (calyptral fold). The upper calypter is usually larger than the lower calypter, but in some groups (Tabanidae, Acroceridae, and many Calyptratae), the lower calypter is larger than the upper one. The calyptral fringe is a fringe of hairs along the posterior margin of each calypter. The tegula is the most proximal plate at the base of the costal margin (also termed the costal plate or epaulet). Next to it (distal) is the basicosta.

The system of venation is simplified but is representative of the Comstock–Needham system, which was conceived in the late nineteenth century to define precisely the terminology of the wing morphology of insects. In Diptera are the wing-veins are costa, subcosta, radial, medial and cubital. In addition, there are two anal veins, of which the second, also called the axillary, separates the anal region from the alula. The details of the wing veins, the transverse veins and the shape of the cells, are important characteristics for determining taxonomic groups including at species level.

Diastatidae wing veins (discal cell absent)

Odiniidae wing veins (discal cell dm present

Melanderomyiinae (anal vein meeting wing margin)

===== Taxonomically important wing venation terms =====
- costa (C), the subcosta (Sc), the radius (R), the media (M), the cubitus (Cu), and the anal vein (A). There has been much disagreement concerning the homologies of the veins posterior to the subcosta in the Diptera and some authors simply number the longitudinal veins from the front to the rear. In addition to the longitudinal veins there are three principal transverse veins, usually called crossveins. These are the inner or anterior crossvein, the posterior or discal crossvein, and the anal crossvein. The principal cells of the wing used in classification are the discal, anal and second basal cells.

The most encountered terms used in Diptera identification keys are:–

- cell cup. Also called the posterior cubital cell and often called the anal cell. The form of the cell cup is an important character.
- costal break. These frequently occur especially in the Schizophora. They are weakenings of the costa and are one to three in number. Normally these breaks are located proximal to the insertion of the subcosta. The most frequently occurring break is just proximal to where the subcosta joins the costa or an imagined point where it would join the costa if complete. A similar break, which occurs almost as frequently, is located slightly distal to the humeral crossvein (crossvein h). The third, far less frequent, break, is found slightly proximal to crossvein h marking off a short, thickened, heavily bristled section at the base of the costa (the costagium of Séguy). The breaks are named the costagial, humeral hb, and subcostal breaks sb. Costal breaks are rare in the Nematocera and the lower Brachycera. They are thought to be flexing points for the wings during flight and they are also associated with pupal folds in the wing.
- subcosta. The second longitudinal wing vein, posterior to the costa. It may reach the costa, fade before the costa or join R1 before it reaches the costa. see (= auxiliary vein of many authors)
- discal cell. A closed cell (d, dm) in the centre of the wing bordered by medial veins and closed by cross-vein M-M in many Nematocera. If it is bordered by vein CuA1 and closed by cross-vein DM-Cu (as in most Lower Brachycera and all higher Diptera) then it is strictly the discal-medial cell (but still often called the discal cell)
- basal radial or first basal (br) cell. This cell is delimited anteriorly by the basal section of radius and the radial sector, distally by the radial-medial crossvein.
- basal medial or second basal (bm) cell. This cell is delimited anteriorly by the basal section of the posterior media and distally by the medial-cubital crossvein.
- sub-apical cell. The cell between veins R4+5, M1+2, rm and the apical wing margin. If M1+2 finishes at the wing margin the subapical cell is open. If M1+2 curves towards R4+5 and joins R4+5 before the wing margin the cell is closed.
- anal vein There may be one or two anal veins (then A1 and A2) reaching or not reaching the wing margin.

The scutellum is nearly always distinct, but much smaller than (and immediately posterior to) the mesoscutum. The scutellum macrochaetae are important in taxonomy.

Radial forks diagram Limoniidae: Nematocera

Cylindrotoma wing veins: Nematocera

Tabanidae wing veins: Brachycera

Phytomyzinae wing veins

Phoridae wing veins (reduced venation)

Cecidomyiinae wing veins (reduced venation)

The relatively thin legs have precisely arranged bristles which also function in chaetotaxy. The femora and tibia may bear combinations of dorsal, anterodorsal, posterodorsal, ventral, anteroventral and posteroventral bristles. The position, number, size and inclination of these bristles is important in the taxonomy of higher flies. The leg flexes (tibia on femur) in the dorsal ventral plane. The dorsum of the tibia (especially) and the femur is often identified by a double line of very small bristles. Another important bristle is the preapical on the tibia (presence or absence is important at family level).

==== Abdomen ====
The morphology of the abdomen is substantially determined by morphoanatomic adaptation, in both sexes, as a function of the reproduction. In general, the 10 urites (one of the segments of the abdomen or post-abdomen) are reduced to a lower number of urites because of structural modifications of the first urite and the last. Typically there is atrophying of the first urite and the merging of 2° and 3° urotergites. Tergites and sternites can be well distinguished from each other, but often there is a differential development, with the tergites overlapping the sternites; the extreme case is when the expansions of tergite ventrally merge, forming a tube structure or ring. In females, the last urites become thinner and stretch forming a flexible telescopic ovipositor. This morphological adaptation is often accompanied by sclerotisation of the terminal eighth urite, so that the ovipositor is able to penetrate through the tissues of the organism which will accommodate the eggs and larvae. In the male, the last urites undergo a complex transformation to form a device, integrated with the genitalia called the hypopygium. The degree and nature of structural change varies according to the systematic group, but usually involves the development of the lobes of the ninth urotergite into forceps (epandrium) and IX urosterno (hypandrium). There is sometimes a twist along the axis of the abdomen, resulting in reversal of the positions of the epandrium and the hypandrium.

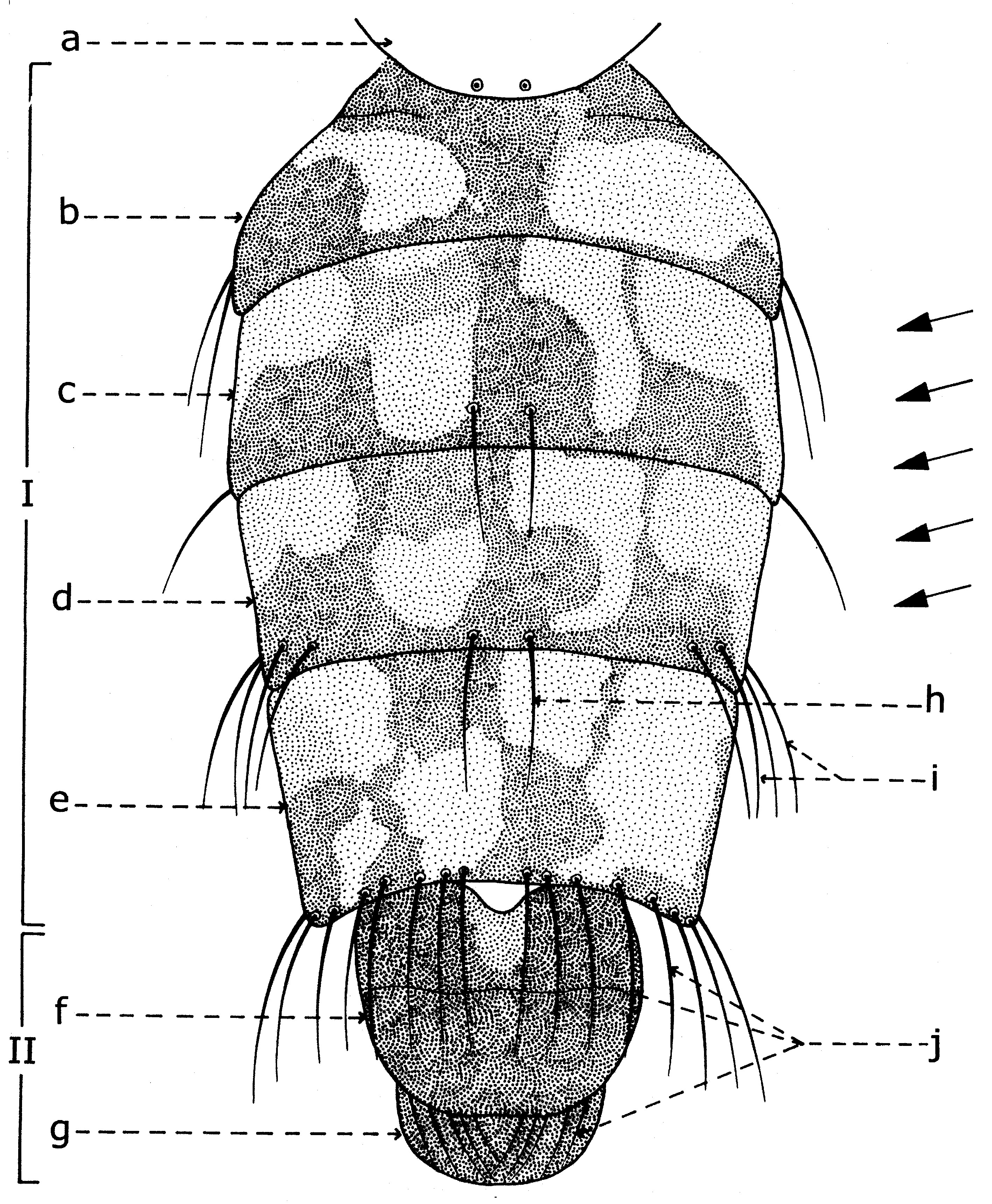
Abdomen of Sarcophaga carnaria

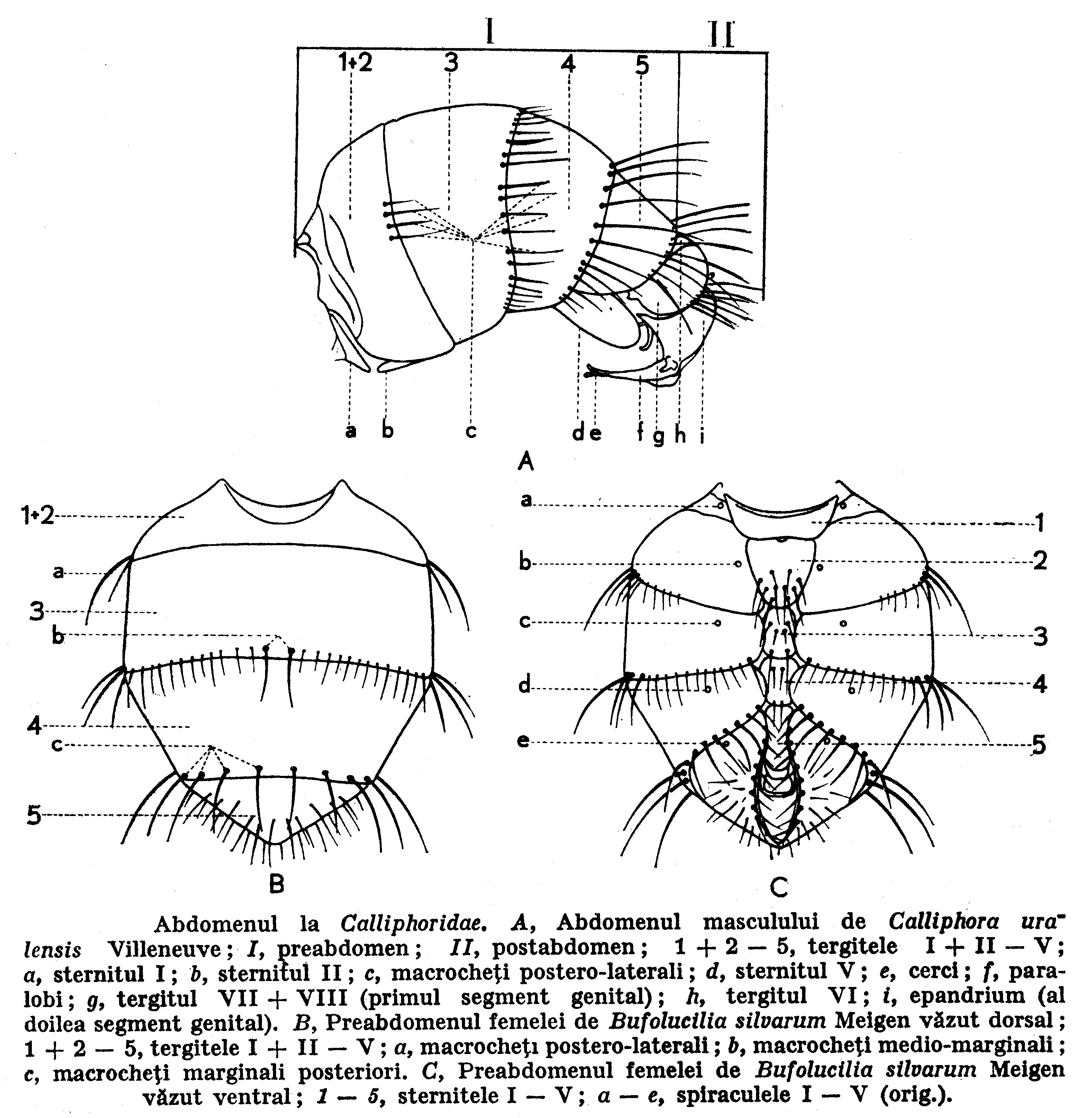
Abdomen of Calliphora

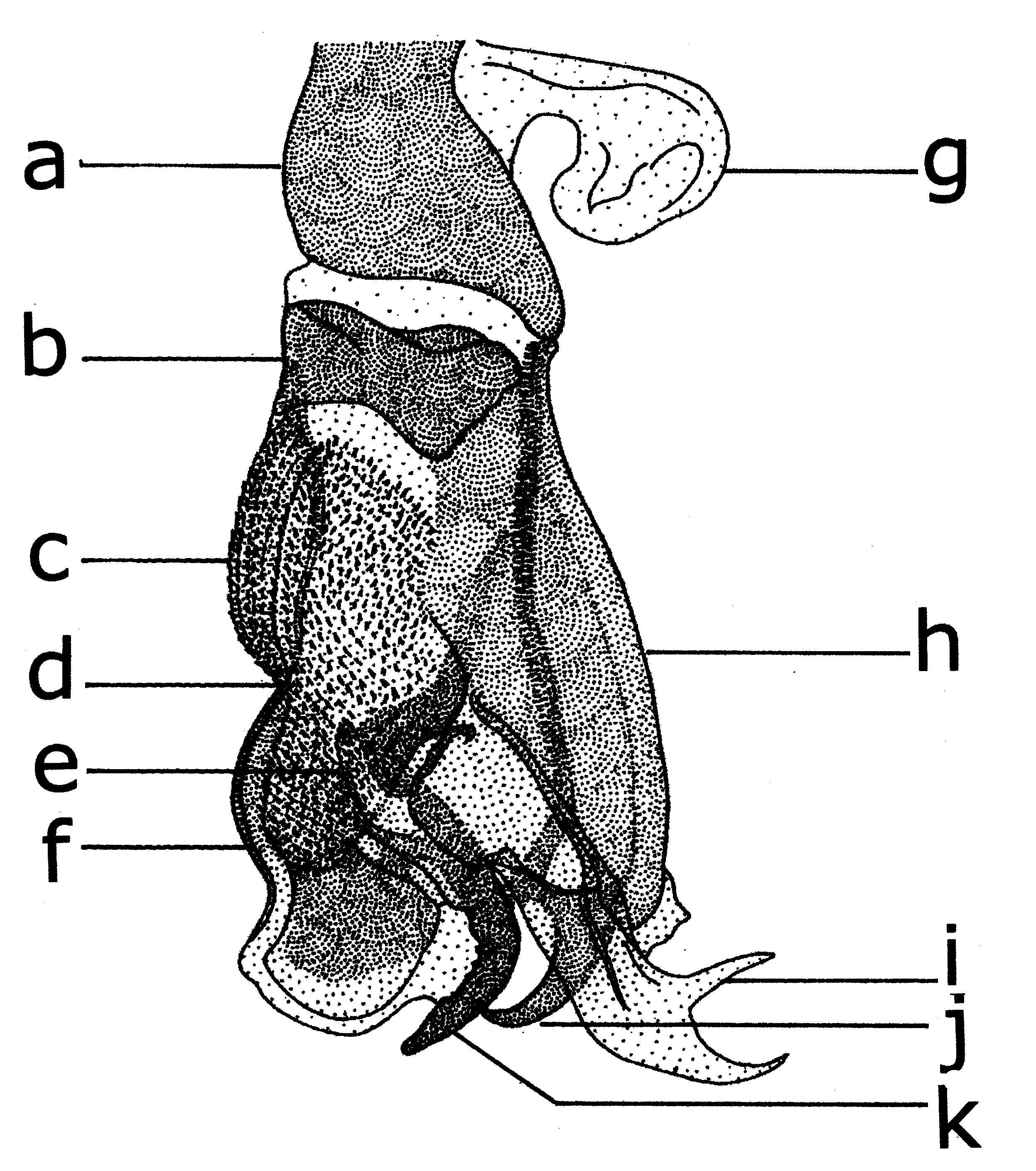
Male genitala in Afridigalia adrianponti

=== Internal ===
==== Digestive system ====
===== Foregut =====
Contraction of the P4 section of the foregut is modulated by serotonin which is exogenous to the foregut itself, arriving instead from the haemolymph. Specifically, serotonin increases the contraction rate. Liscia et al 2012 demonstrated that this serotonin probably originates in the serotonin neural plexus in the thoracic-abdominal synganglion. If the crop is full and serotonin arrives at P4, P4 will contract and push the contents into P2, and depending on the sphincter activation at that time P2 will push it into the midgut for digestion or regurgitate it out to the void.

== Larva ==
Most of the larvae of Diptera live in an aquatic environment, in decaying organic substrates, and in other organisms (fungi, animals, plants). Their morphological structure therefore has a substantial simplification.

The Diptera larva is apodous (with no legs), but sometimes, especially in aquatic larvae, has appendages similar to pseudopodia. The head is usually devoid of eyes, has chewing mouthparts, modified antennae with up to six segments, more or less developed or reduced to papillae. The head can be: clearly distinguished from the thorax (eucephalic larvae), indistinct from the rest of the body (microcephalic), or sunken in the thorax (cryptocephalic).

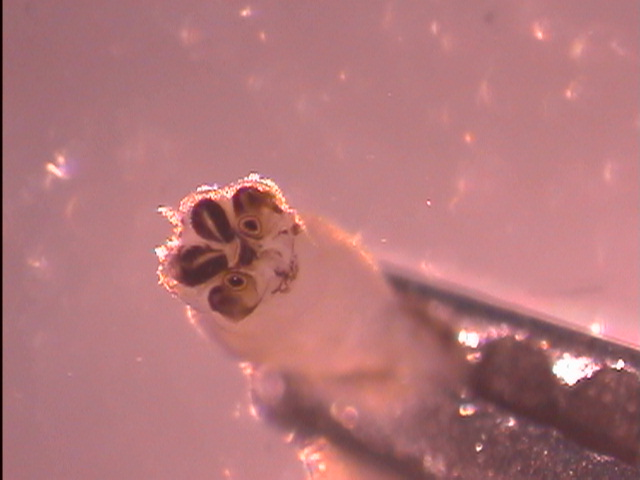
Molophilus, Tipulidae. The wormlike larva has no prolegs or welts, but lobes and spiracles (two) at the posterior end identifies it as Diptera.

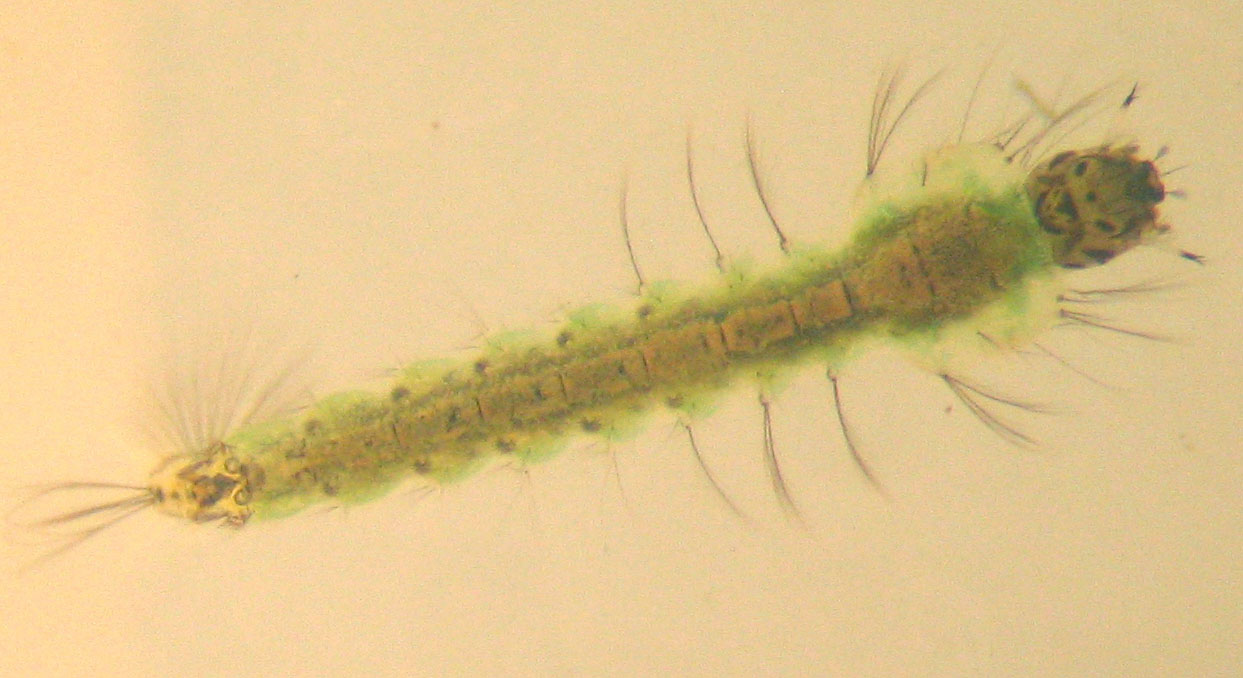
Anopheles larva (eucephalic larvae)

Culex restuans larva

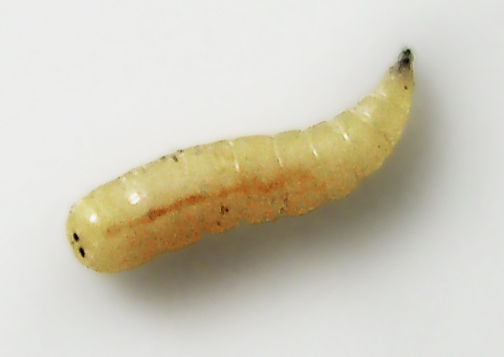
Muscidae larva (microcephalic)

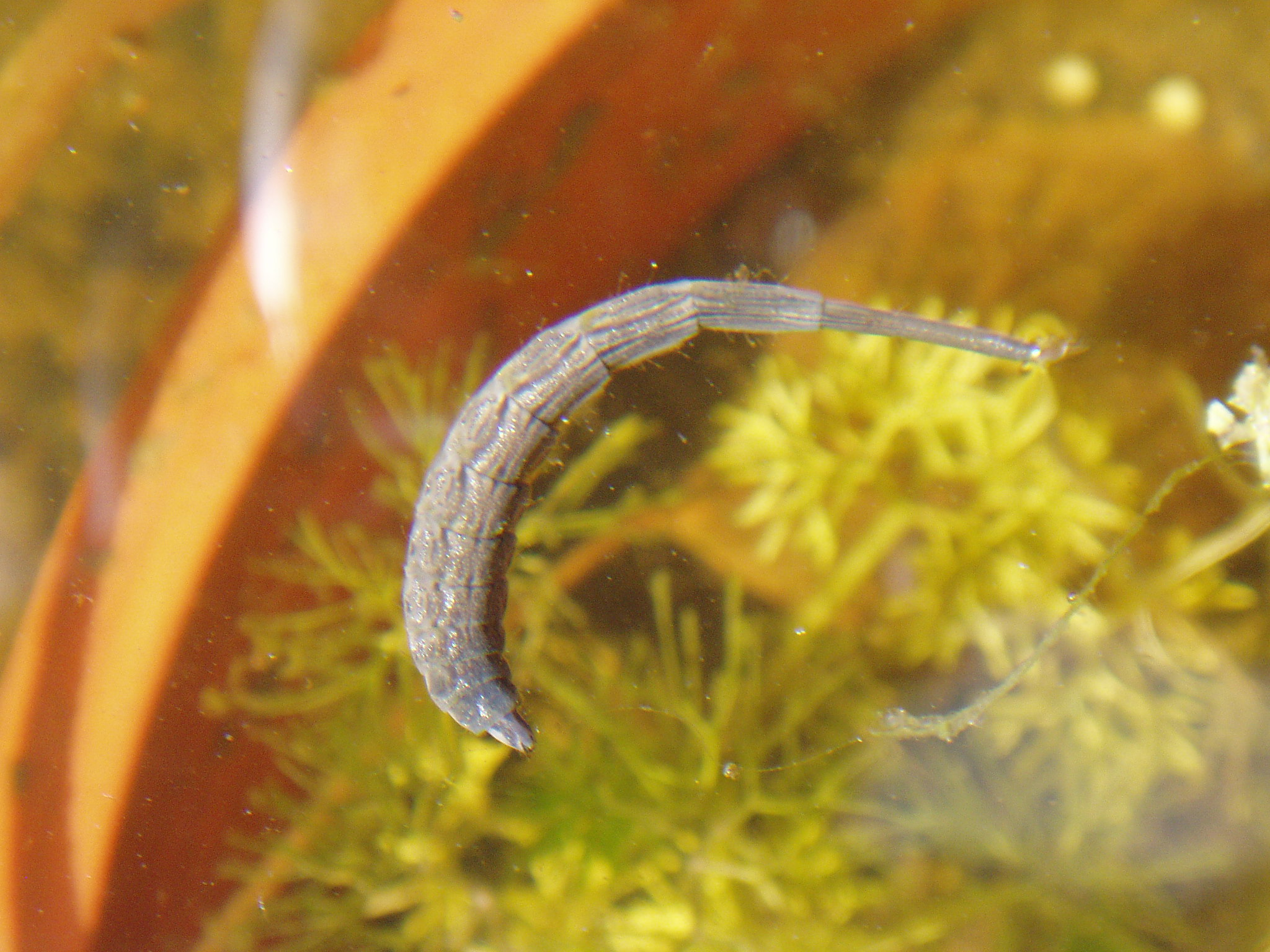
Stratiomyidae larva

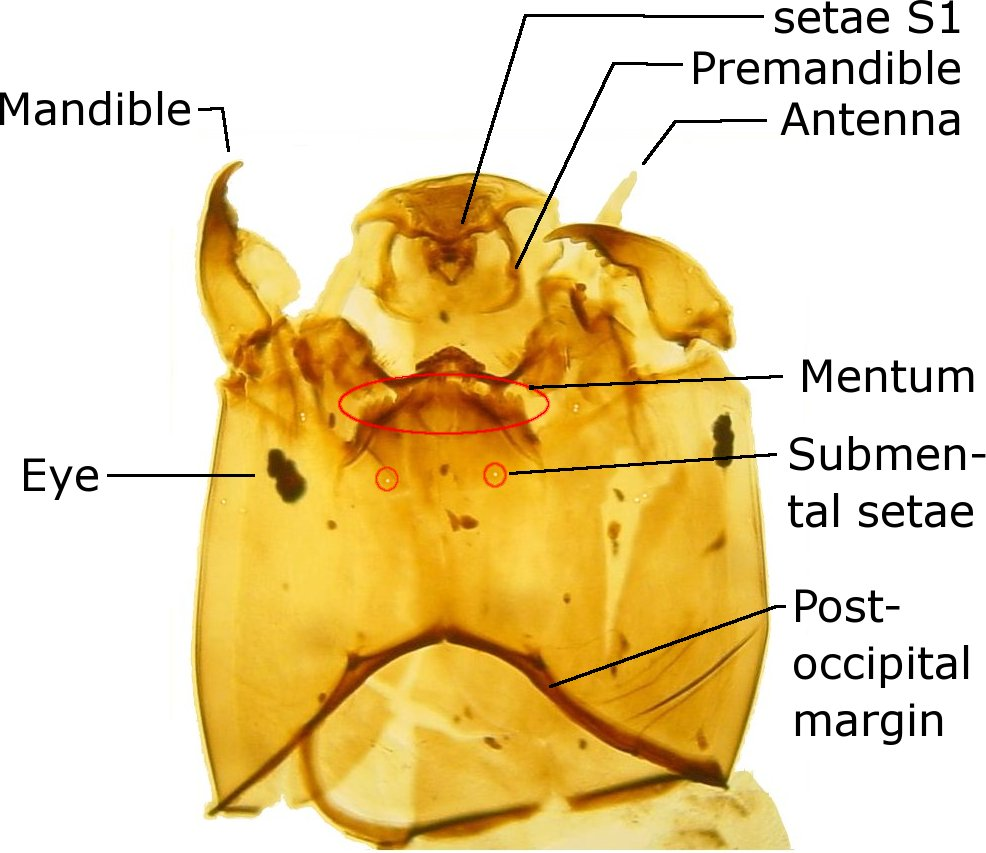
Orthocladiinae head

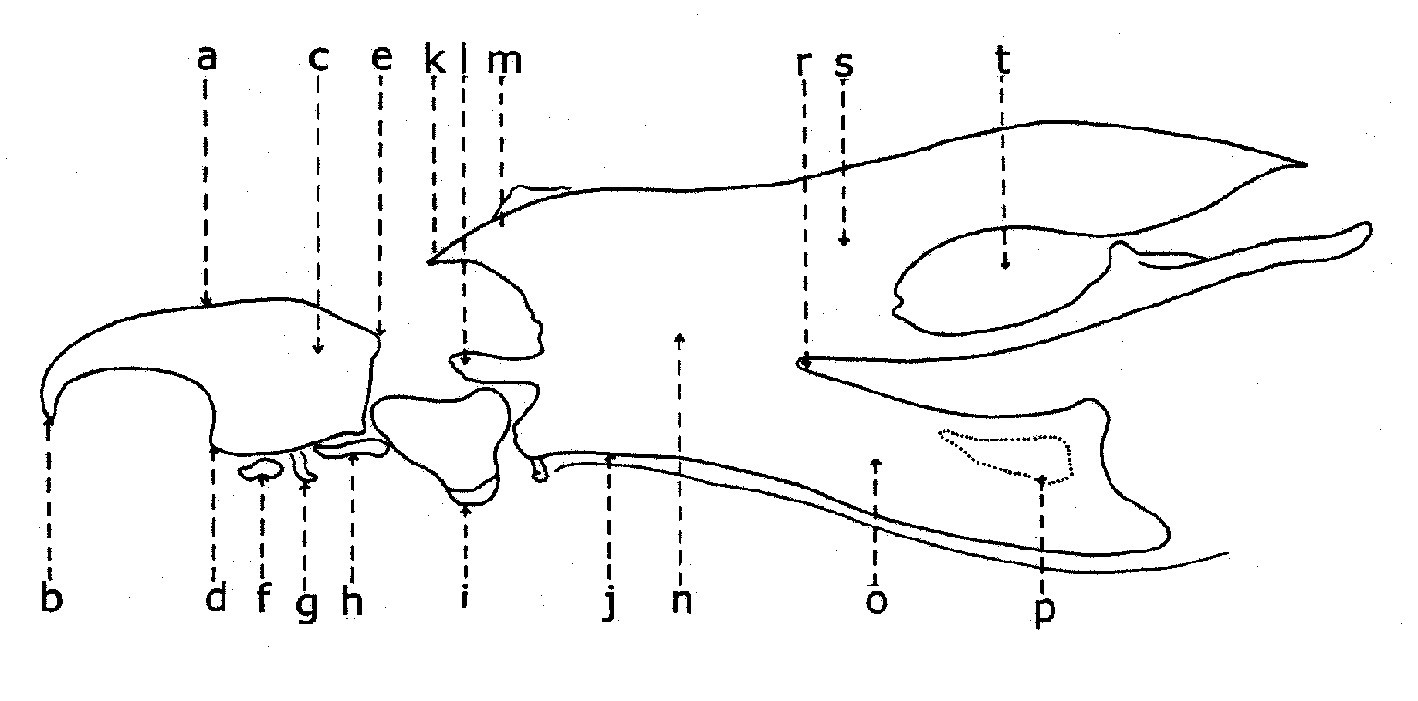
Cephalo-pharyngeal apparatus

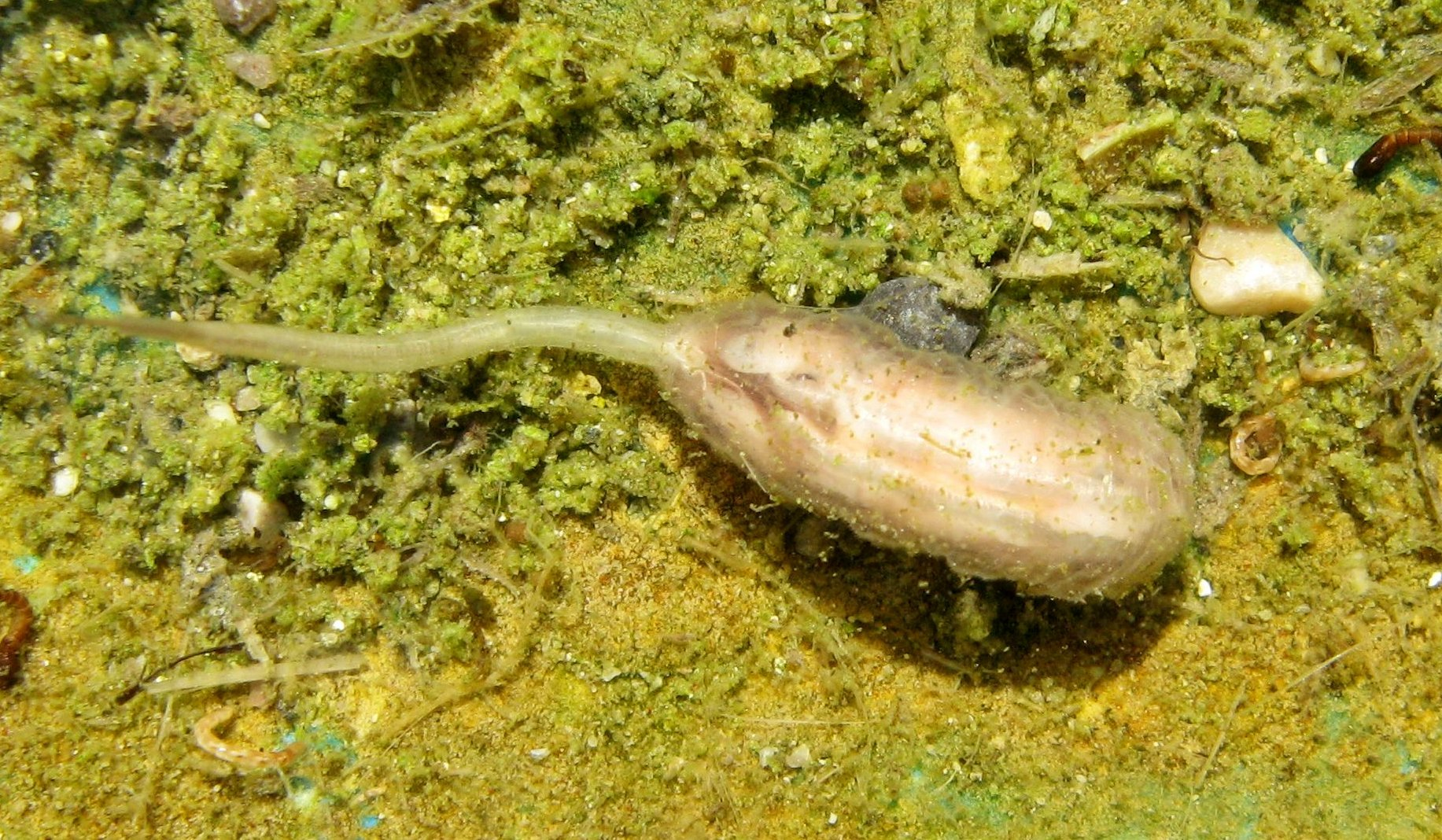
Eristalis larva with respiratory siphon

Depending on the number and position of the tracheal spiracles, the following types of breathing apparatus can be distinguished.

- apneustic, with absence of stigmas (spiracles)
- metapneustic, with only one pair of stigmata. These are on the abdomen.
- amphipneustic, with two pairs of stigmas. On pair on the prothorax, one pair on the abdomen.
- holopneustic, with two pairs of thoracic stigmas and eight abdominal pairs.

The most frequent type, found in the generality of Brachycera, is amphipneustic, while other types appear mostly in aquatic larvae. The larvae of Brachycera Cyclorrhapha have a wormlike appearance, with little differentiation of body regions (head, thorax, abdomen) to the point that they are commonly called, improperly, worms. These larvae have a cylindro-conical form, wider in the abdomen. Simplified mouthparts, represented by two jaws shaped like a hook and a series of internal cephalic sclerites, which form in the complex cephalo-pharyngeal apparatus unlike other chewing mouthparts, the hooks of the cephalo-pharyngeal apparatus are equipped with movements along a vertical plane.

Special morphological adaptations are observed in larvae adapted to live in an aquatic environment or as endoparasitoids: for example, sapropagous aquatic larvae of Eristalis which have a long respiratory siphon, which allows them to live immersed in slushy or in putrid waters, while those of Tachinidae have breathing tubes that lead into tracheae of the host or outside of the host's body.

== Pupa ==
The pupae of Diptera can be obtect, exarate or coarctate. Obtect pupae have the outlines of the wings and legs visible but pressed close to the rest of the body, as the whole is wrapped by a single cuticle; exarate pupae have the appendages enveloped by a cuticle of their own and are therefore detachable from the rest of the insect. Coarctate pupae develop inside the larval skin.

Pupae of Cyclorrhapha, suborder Brachycera, have coarctate pupae in a puparium (a case formed by the hardening of the larval skin), formed by a modification of morphological and biochemical exuvia of the last larval stage. The way in which the opening of the puparium, at the time of adult emergence, distinguishes between two large systematic groups, the Aschiza and Schizophora.

Obtect pupae are generally free and unprotected, with the exception of those of Simuliidae, which are protected by bozzoletti constructed with debris cemented together by silk.

In the last phase of their lives, the pupae of Diptera become mobile.

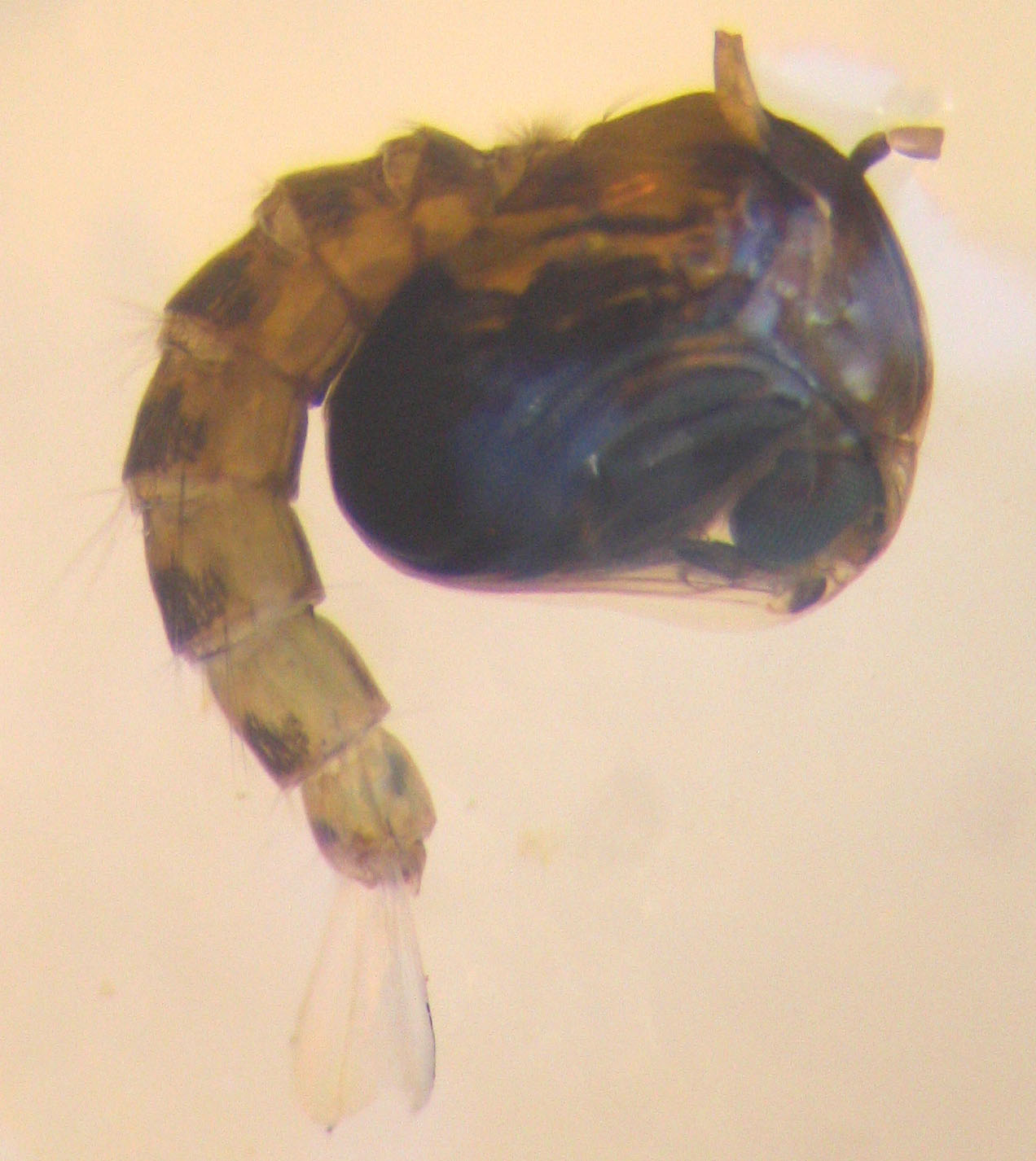
Obtect pupa of Anopheles

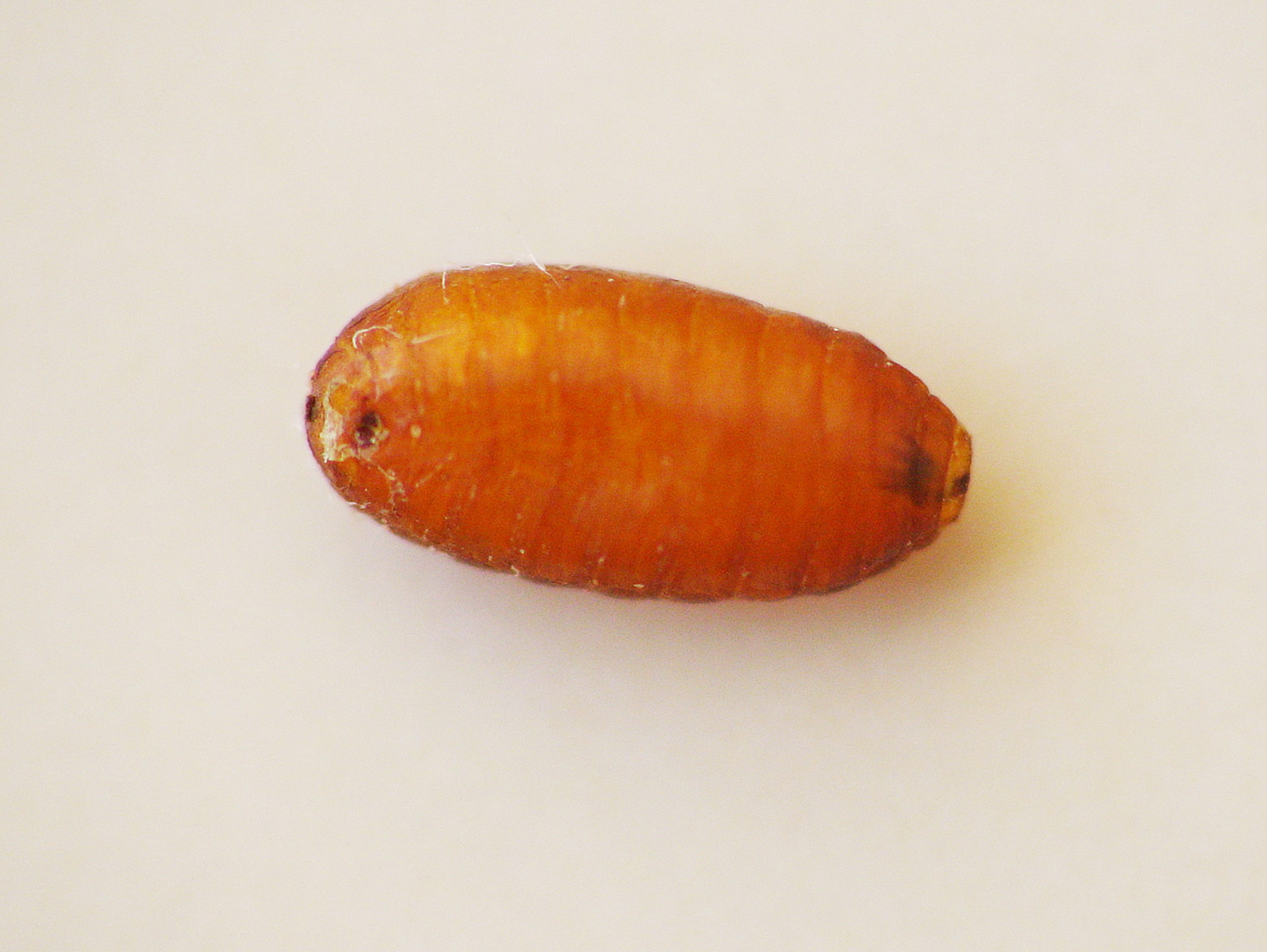
Puparium of Ceratitis capitata

== References and further reading ==
- Brown, B.V., Borkent, A., Cumming, J.M., Wood, D.M., Woodley, N.E., and Zumbado, M. (Editors) 2009 Manual of Central American Diptera. Volume 1 NRC Research Press, Ottawa ISBN 978-0-660-19833-0
- Capinera, John L. (ed.), 2008 Encyclopedia of Entomology Springer Verlag. ISBN 978-1-4020-6242-1.
- Colless, D.H. & McAlpine, D.K. 1991 Diptera (flies), pp. 717–786. In: The Division of Entomology. Commonwealth Scientific and Industrial Research Organisation, Canberra (spons.), The insects of Australia. Melbourne Univ. Press, Melbourne.
- Griffiths, G.C.D. The phylogenetic classification of Diptera Cyclorrhapha, with special reference to the structure of the male postabdomen. Ser. Ent. 8, 340 pp. [Dr. W. Junk, N. V., The Hague] (1972).
- Willi Hennig Die Larvenformen der Dipteren. 3. Teil. Akad.-Verlag, Berlin. 185 pp., 3 pls. 1948
- McAlpine, David K., 1958 A key to the Australian families of Acalptrate Diptera (Insecta) Records of the Australian Museum 24 (12) 183-190 pdf full text and figures
- McAlpine, J.F. 1981 Morphology and terminology In: McAlpine, J.P. et al. (eds.): Manual of Nearctic Diptera vol. 1 Ottawa: Research Branch, Agriculture Canada, Monograph 27. ISBN 0660107317 pdf download manual
- Bernhard Merz, Jean-Paul Haenni, 2000 Morphology and terminology of adult Diptera (other than terminalia). In: László Papp, Béla Darvas Contributions to a Manual of Palaearctic Diptera. Volume 1: General and Applied Dipterology. Budapest, Science Herald, 2000: 22–51. ISBN 963-04-8839-6.
- K. G. V. Smith, 1989 An introduction to the immature stages of British Flies. Diptera Larvae, with notes on eggs, puparia and pupae. Handbooks for the Identification of British Insects Vol 10 Part 14. pdf download manual (two parts Main text and figures index)
- Hongfu, Zhu, 1949 How to know the immature insects; an illustrated key for identifying the orders and families of many of the immature insects with suggestions for collecting, rearing and studying them, by H. F. Chu. Pictured key nature series Dubuque, Iowa, W. C. Brown Co.Full text online here
