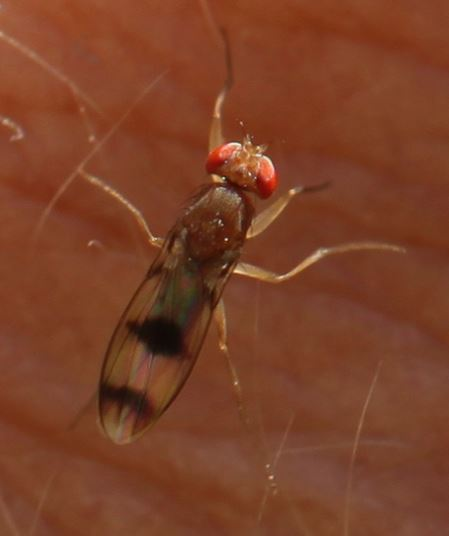

Scientific classification
- Domain: Eukaryota
- Kingdom: Animalia
- Phylum: Arthropoda
- Class: Insecta
- Order: Diptera
- Family: Drosophilidae
- Genus: Chymomyza
- Species: C. amoena

Binomial name
- Chymomyza amoena (Loew, 1862)

Synonyms
- Drosophila amoena Loew, 1862; Drosophila amaena Brauer, 1883; Sapromyza subfasciata Harris, 1835

= Chymomyza amoena =

Species of fly

Chymomyza amoena is a species of fruit fly in the family Drosophilidae. It is found in Europe.

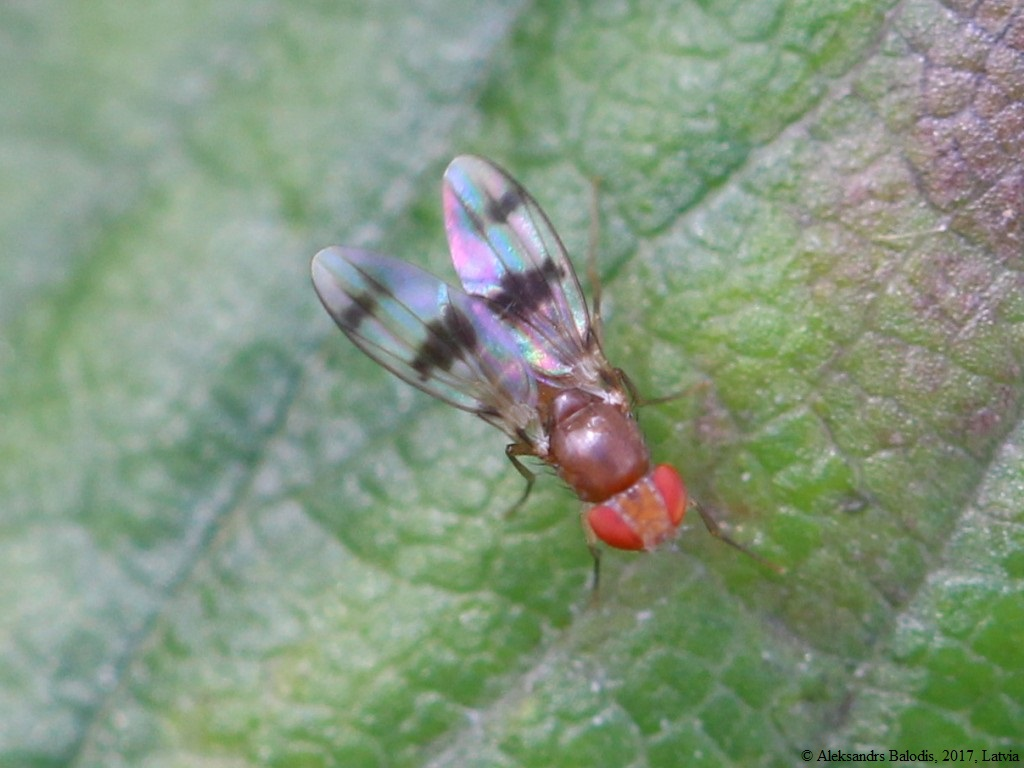

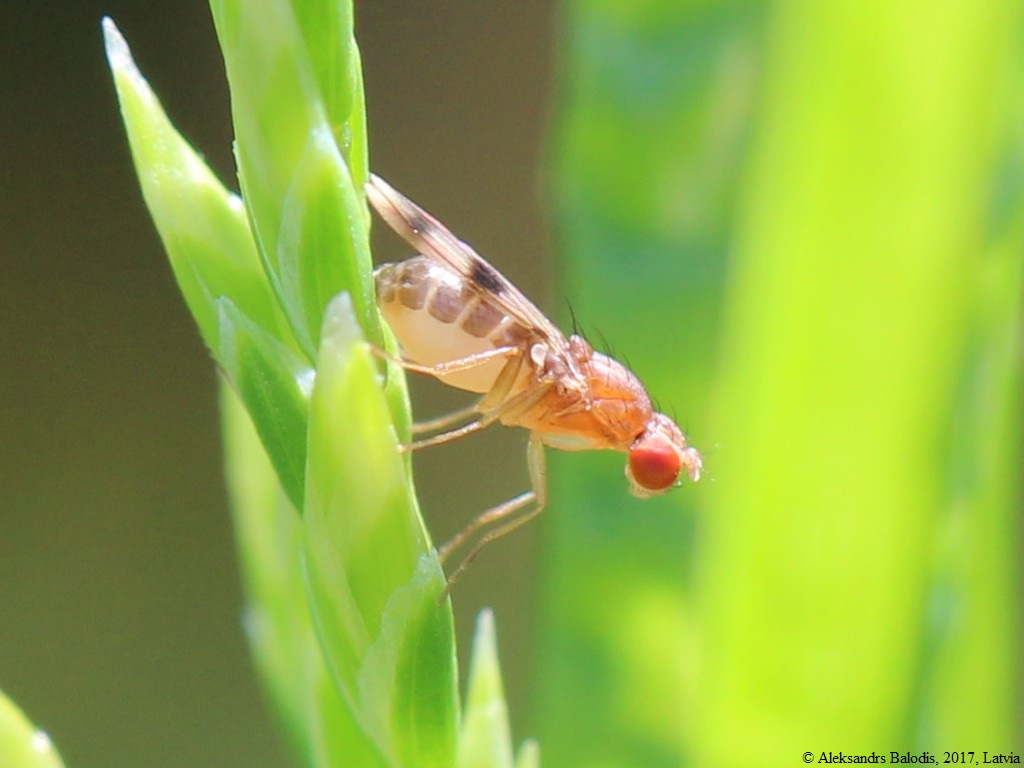
