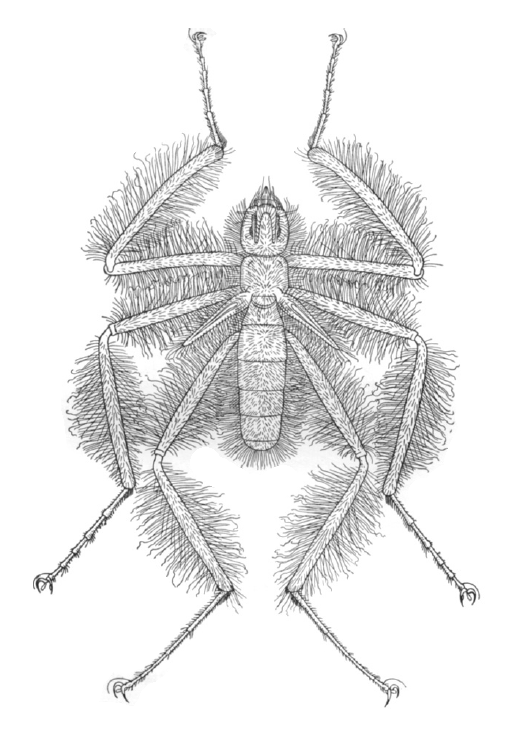
- A drawing of male specimen

Scientific classification
- Kingdom: Animalia
- Phylum: Arthropoda
- Class: Insecta
- Order: Diptera
- Superfamily: Ephydroidea
- Family: Mormotomyiidae; Austen, 1936
- Genus: Mormotomyia; Austen, 1936
- Species: M. hirsuta

Binomial name
- Mormotomyia hirsuta Austen, 1936

= Mormotomyia =

Species of fly

The family Mormotomyiidae (Diptera: Ephydroidea) contains only one known species, Mormotomyia hirsuta, commonly known as the frightful hairy fly or terrible hairy fly, which is found in Kenya. The fly was first described by English entomologist Ernest Edward Austen, and specimens have been collected from one location on a mountain in the Ukasi Hill (Okazzi Hills), in a cleft where a bat roost is located; this may possibly be the most restricted geographic distribution for any fly family. The larvae have been collected from bat guano. Adult flies are believed to feed on bodily secretions of bats. The fly measures about 1 cm long, with hairy legs, and, due to its nonfunctional wings and tiny eyes, looks more like a spider than a fly. Specimens have been collected only three times, in 1933, 1948, and 2010. Tested members of the population showed higher levels of genetic variation than would be expected for such a restricted range, suggesting that additional undiscovered populations exist with gene flow occurring between them and the known population in Ukasi Hill.

== Taxonomy ==
While the fly was originally thought to belong in the superfamily Sphaeroceroidea, later authorities placed it in Hippoboscoidea, still later work suggested it belonged instead to the Carnoidea, but work in 2011 suggested that its true affiliation is to Ephydroidea.
