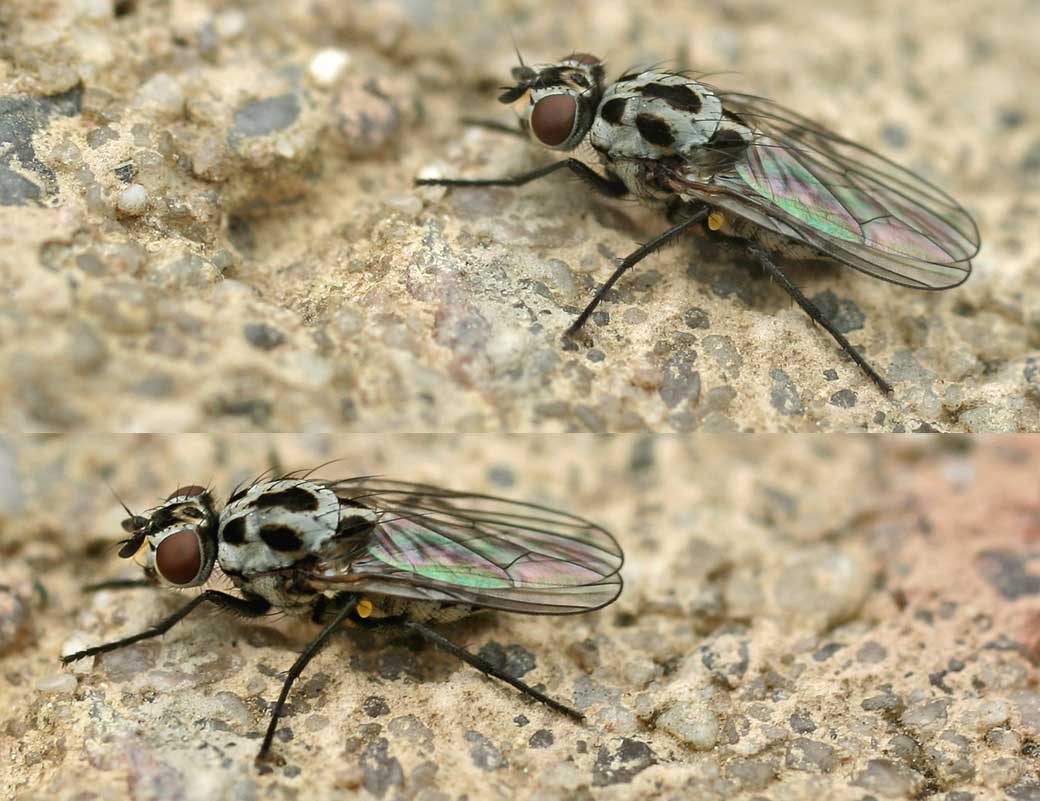
- Anthomyia pluvialis

Scientific classification
- Kingdom: Animalia
- Phylum: Arthropoda
- Clade: Pancrustacea
- Class: Insecta
- Order: Diptera
- Clade: Eremoneura
- Clade: Cyclorrhapha
- Section: Schizophora
- Subsection: Calyptratae
- Superfamily: Muscoidea

Families
- Anthomyiidae — cabbage flies; Fanniidae — little house flies; Muscidae — house flies; Scathophagidae — dung flies

= Muscoidea =

Superfamily of flies

Muscoidea is a superfamily of flies in the subsection Calyptratae. Muscoidea, with approximately 7000 described species, is nearly 5% of the known species level diversity of the Diptera, the true flies. Most muscoid flies are saprophagous, coprophagous or necrophagous as larvae, but some species are parasitic, predatory, or phytophagous. In September 2008, a study was done on the superfamily using both nucleic and mitochondrial DNA and the conclusion suggested that Muscoidea may actually be paraphyletic.
