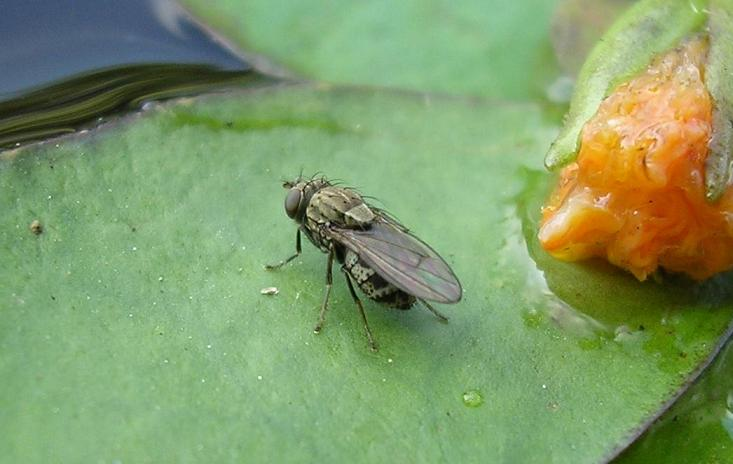
- Notiphila watanabei

Scientific classification
- Kingdom: Animalia
- Phylum: Arthropoda
- Class: Insecta
- Order: Diptera
- Section: Schizophora
- Subsection: Acalyptratae
- Superfamily: Ephydroidea

Families
- Camillidae; Curtonotidae - quasimodo flies; Diastatidae - bog flies; Drosophilidae - vinegar and fruit flies; Ephydridae - shore flies; Mormotomyiidae

= Ephydroidea =

Superfamily of flies

The Ephydroidea are a superfamily of muscomorph flies, with over 6,000 species.

== Description ==
A characteristic of adult Ephydroidea (shared with their relatives such as Calyptratae) is that the pedicel of the antenna has a dorsoventral seam or incision.

== Ecology ==
Ephydroidea live in many habitats and have diverse diets. For example, most Ephydridae have larvae that are aquatic/semi-aquatic and feed as browsers or filter-feeders, but there are also species with terrestrial larvae that are egg predators, egg parasitoids, leaf miners or saprophages. Most Drosophilidae breed in rotting material where they feed on yeast and bacteria, but there are also species that attack whole fruits.

== Phylogeny ==
A 2021 analysis found Ephydroidea to be the sister taxon to Calyptratae.
