= Zelotes aestus =

Namibia Dark Ground Spider

Conservation status
- Least Concern (SANBI Red List)

Scientific classification
- Kingdom: Animalia
- Phylum: Arthropoda
- Subphylum: Chelicerata
- Class: Arachnida
- Order: Araneae
- Infraorder: Araneomorphae
- Family: Gnaphosidae
- Genus: Zelotes
- Species: Z. aestus

Binomial name
- Zelotes aestus (Tucker, 1923)

Synonyms
- Camillina aestus Tucker, 1923

Species of spider

Zelotes aestus is a species of spider in the family Gnaphosidae. It is commonly known as the namibia dark ground spider.

== Distribution ==
Zelotes aestus is distributed across Namibia and South Africa. In South Africa, it has been recorded from two provinces, Gauteng and Limpopo, at altitudes ranging from 438 to 1,333 m above sea level.

The species has been sampled from Pretoria/Tshwane (Rietondale Research Station) in Gauteng, and multiple localities in Limpopo including Polokwane Nature Reserve, Vhembe Biosphere reserves at Maremani Game Reserve and Nwanedi Game Reserve, and various other locations throughout the province.

== Habitat and ecology ==
Zelotes aestus inhabits the Savanna and Grassland biomes. The species consists of free-running ground spiders that are typically collected using pitfall traps.

== Conservation ==
Zelotes aestus is listed as Least Concern by the South African National Biodiversity Institute due to its wide geographic range. The species is protected in three reserves: Polokwane Nature Reserve, Maremani Game Reserve, and Nwanedi Game Reserve. There are no significant threats to the species except at the locality in Gauteng where development is taking place.

== Taxonomy ==
The species was originally described by Tucker in 1923 from Namibia as Camillina aestus. It was later transferred to the genus Zelotes by FitzPatrick in 2007 during his taxonomic revision of Afrotropical Zelotes species. The species is known from both sexes.
