= Curtonotum helvum =

Scientific classification
- Domain: Eukaryota
- Kingdom: Animalia
- Phylum: Arthropoda
- Class: Insecta
- Order: Diptera
- Family: Curtonotidae
- Genus: Curtonotum
- Species: C. helvum

Binomial name
- Curtonotum helvum (Loew, 1862)

Synonyms
- Diplocentra helvum Loew, 1862

Species of fly

Curtonotum helvum, the curtonotid fly, is a species of fly in the family Curtonotidae.
