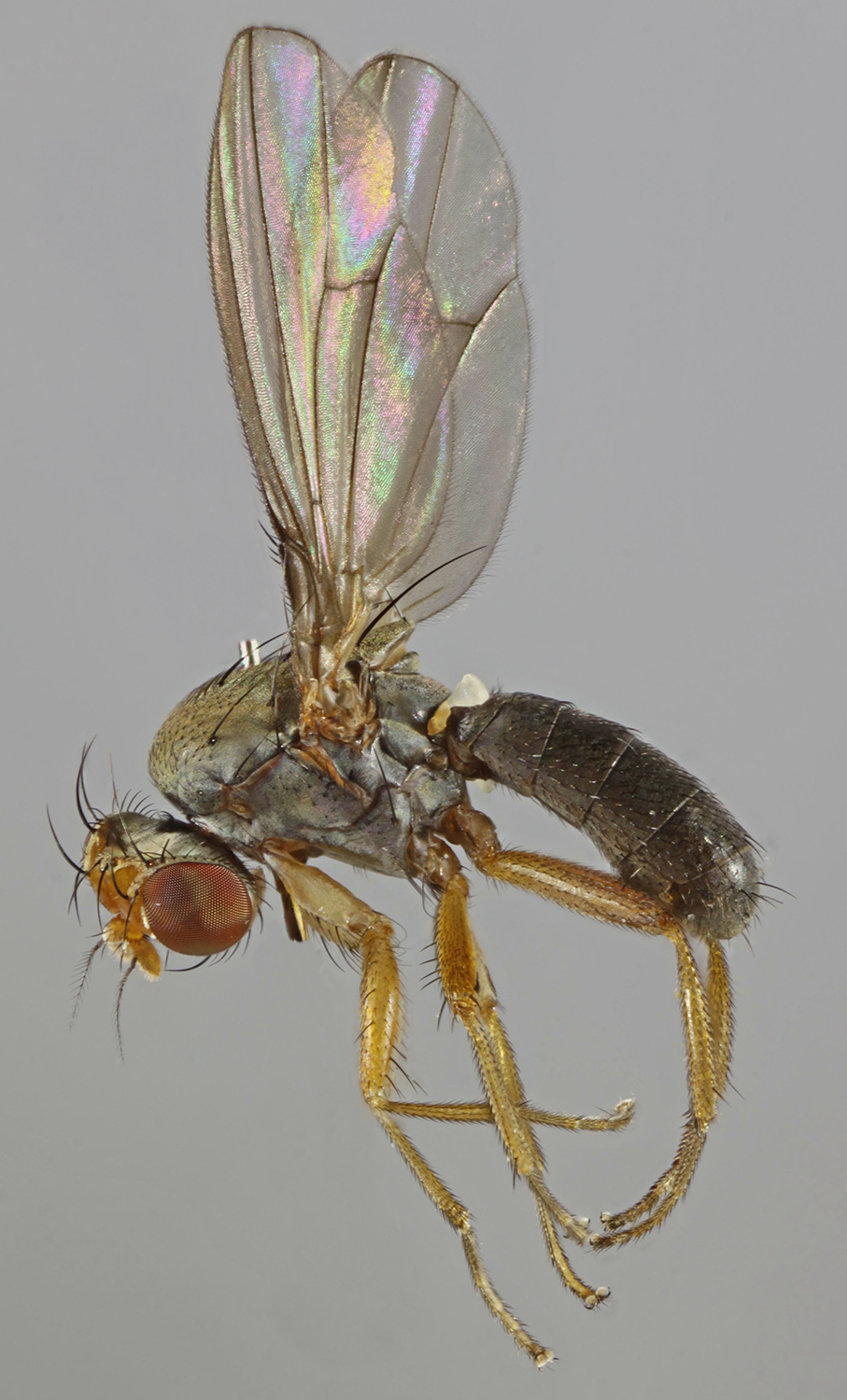
- Diastata fuscula North Wales

Scientific classification
- Kingdom: Animalia
- Phylum: Arthropoda
- Class: Insecta
- Order: Diptera
- Family: Diastatidae
- Genus: Diastata
- Species: D. fuscula

Binomial name
- Diastata fuscula (Fallén,1823)

= Diastata fuscula =

Species of fly

Diastata fuscula is a species of fly in the family Diastatidae. It is found in the Palearctic.
