= D. costata =

D. costata may refer to:

- Dacryodes costata, a tree species
- Diaphania costata, a moth species
- Diastata costata, a fly species
