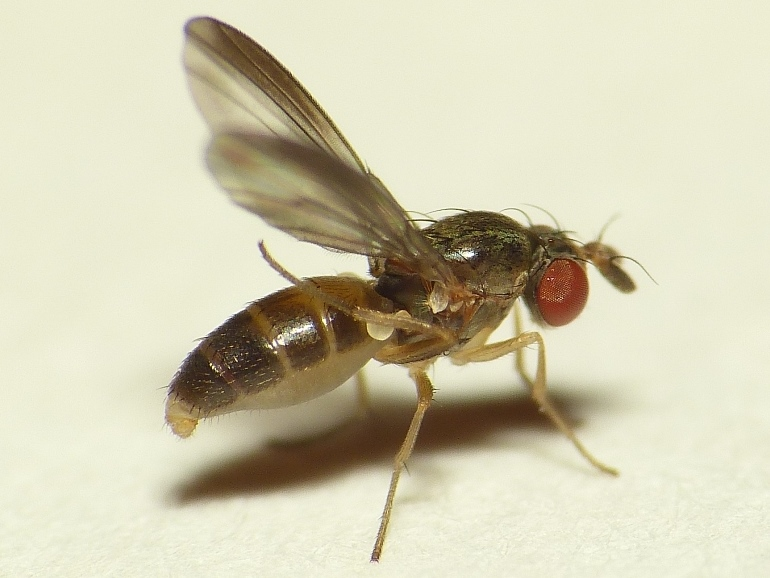

Scientific classification
- Kingdom: Animalia
- Phylum: Arthropoda
- Class: Insecta
- Order: Diptera
- Family: Campichoetidae
- Genus: Campichoeta
- Species: C. obscuripennis

Binomial name
- Campichoeta obscuripennis (Meigen, 1830)

Synonyms
- Campichoeta rufipes Macquart, 1835; Diastata fumipennis Meigen, 1830; Diastata luctuosa Meigen, 1830; Diastata nigricornis Loew, 1864

= Campichoeta obscuripennis =

Species of fly

Campichoeta obscuripennis is a species of fly in the family Campichoetidae. It is found in the Palearctic.
