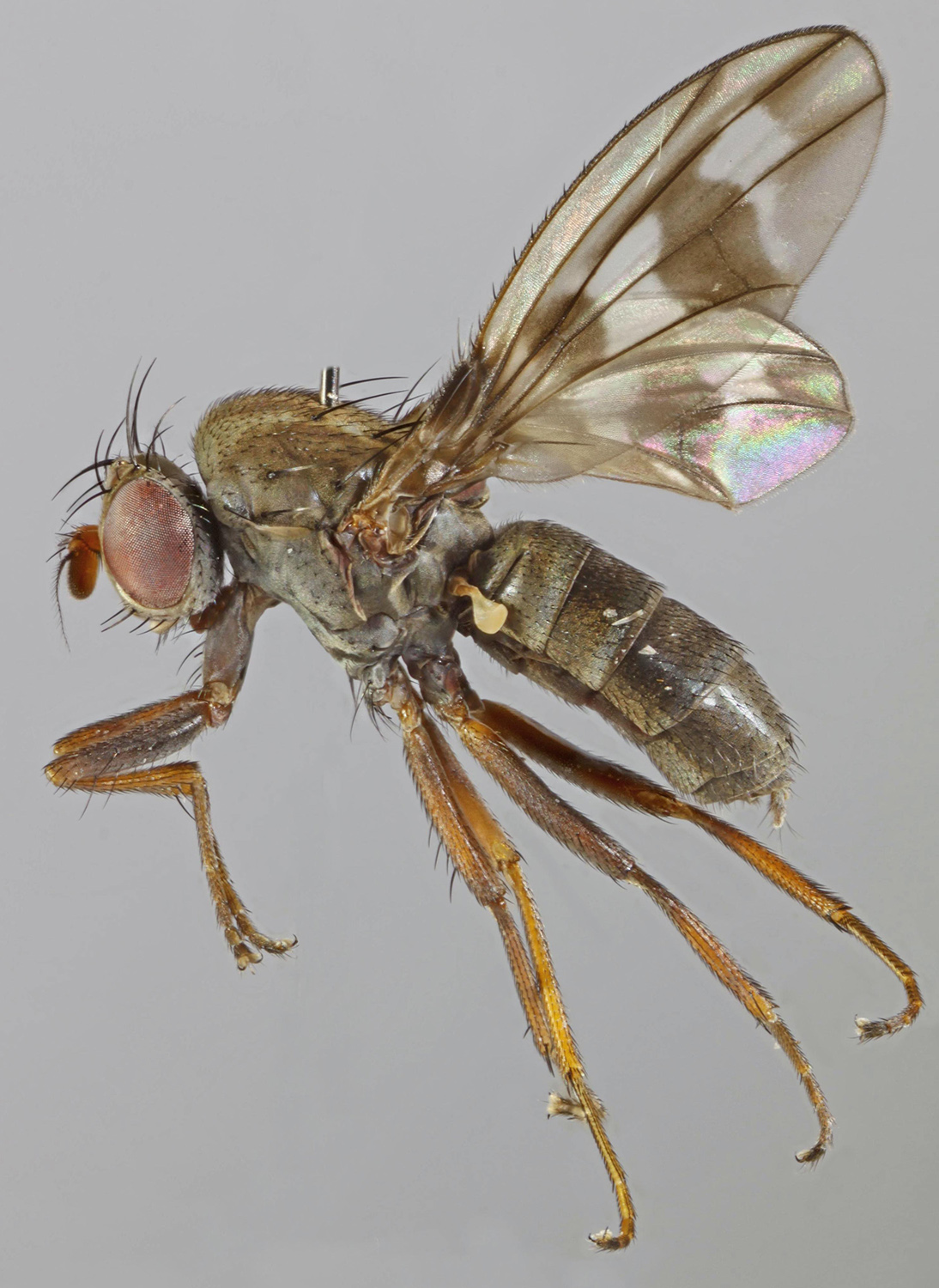
- Diastata nebulosa North Wales

Scientific classification
- Kingdom: Animalia
- Phylum: Arthropoda
- Class: Insecta
- Order: Diptera
- Family: Diastatidae
- Genus: Diastata
- Species: D. nebulosa

Binomial name
- Diastata nebulosa (Fallén,1823)

= Diastata nebulosa =

Species of fly

Diastata nebulosa is a species of fly in the family Diastatidae. It is found in the Palearctic.
