= Camilla flavicauda =

Scientific classification
- Kingdom: Animalia
- Phylum: Arthropoda
- Class: Insecta
- Order: Diptera
- Family: Camillidae
- Genus: Camilla
- Species: C. flavicauda

Binomial name
- Camilla flavicauda Duda, 1922

Species of fly

Camilla flavicauda is a species of fly in the family Camillidae. It is found in the Palearctic.
