= Euthychaeta =

Scientific classification
- Kingdom: Animalia
- Phylum: Arthropoda
- Clade: Pancrustacea
- Class: Insecta
- Order: Diptera
- Family: Campichoetidae
- Genus: Euthychaeta; Meigen, 1830

Type species
- Diastata spectabilis Loew, 1864

Genus of flies

Euthychaeta is a genus of flies in the Diastatidae family.

== Species ==
- E. spectabilis (Loew, 1864)
