= Camillina aldabrae =

African Pearly-Eyed Ground Spider

Conservation status
- Least Concern (SANBI Red List)

Scientific classification
- Kingdom: Animalia
- Phylum: Arthropoda
- Subphylum: Chelicerata
- Class: Arachnida
- Order: Araneae
- Infraorder: Araneomorphae
- Family: Gnaphosidae
- Genus: Camillina
- Species: C. aldabrae

Binomial name
- Camillina aldabrae (Strand, 1907)

Species of spider

Camillina aldabrae is a species of spider in the family Gnaphosidae. It has a wide distribution from Aldabra to Central Africa and South Africa, and is commonly known as the African pearly-eyed ground spider.

== Distribution ==
Camillina aldabrae has a broad distribution from Aldabra to Central Africa and South Africa, and has been introduced to Borneo. In South Africa, it is known from four provinces, Eastern Cape, Free State, KwaZulu-Natal, and Western Cape.

== Habitat and ecology ==
The species is a free-living ground dweller found at altitudes ranging from 93 to 839 m above sea level. It has been sampled from Savanna and Thicket biomes, and has also been collected in maize fields.

== Description ==
C. aldabrae is known from both sexes.

== Conservation ==
Camillina aldabrae is listed as Least Concern by the South African National Biodiversity Institute due to its wide distribution range. The species is protected in Tembe Elephant Park, Ithala Nature Reserve, and Aardvark Nature Reserve.

== Taxonomy ==
The species was originally described by Strand in 1907 as Echemella aldabrae. It was revised by Platnick & Murphy in 1987.
