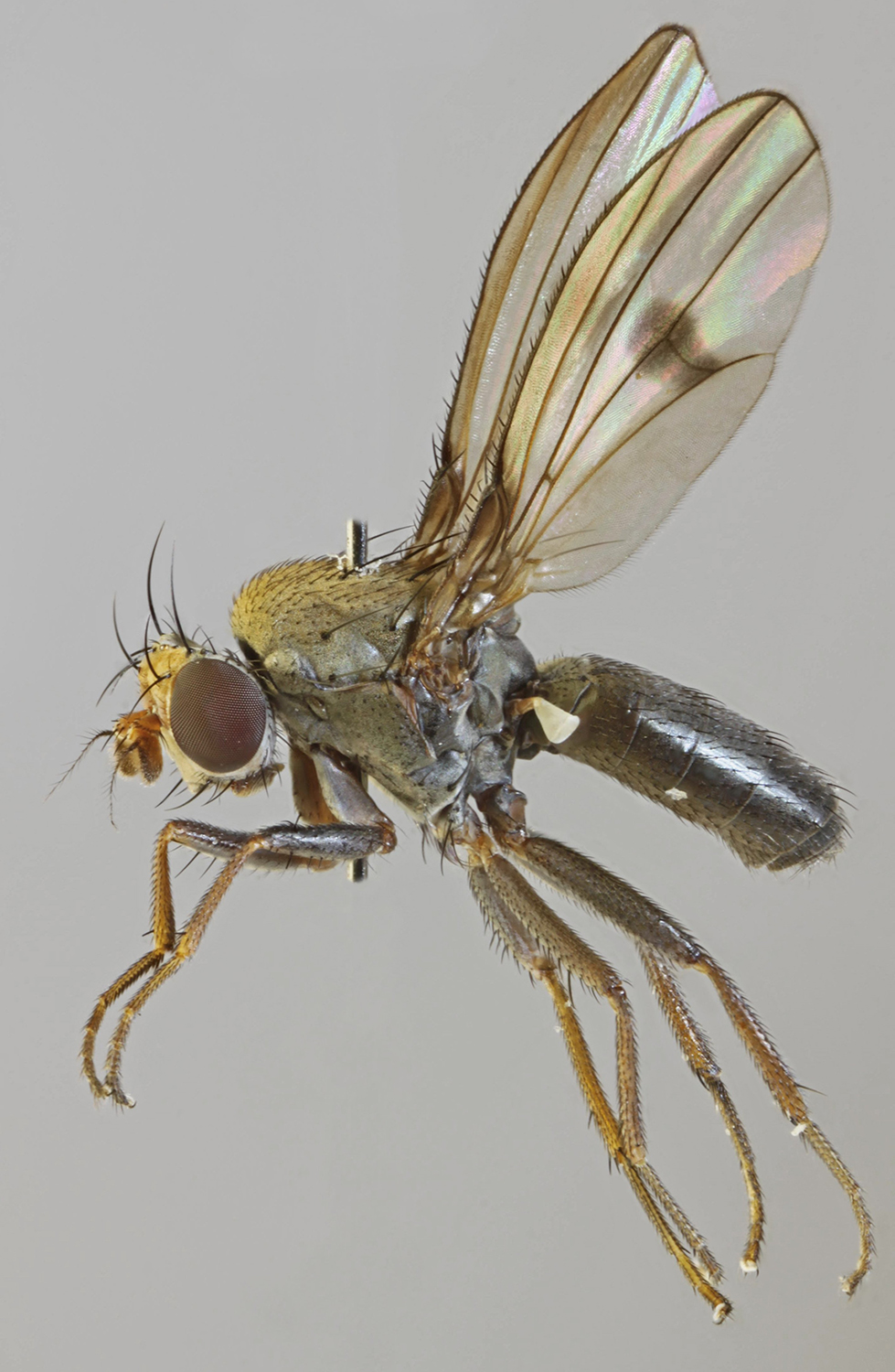
- Diastata adusta North Wales

Scientific classification
- Kingdom: Animalia
- Phylum: Arthropoda
- Class: Insecta
- Order: Diptera
- Family: Diastatidae
- Genus: Diastata
- Species: D. adusta

Binomial name
- Diastata adusta Meigen, 1830

Synonyms
- Diastata unipunctata Zetterstedt, 1847

= Diastata adusta =

Species of fly

Diastata adusta is a species of fly in the family Diastatidae. It is found in the Palearctic.

== Range ==
Belgium, Bulgaria, Czech Republic, Denmark, Finland, France, Germany, Great Britain, Hungary, Ireland, Italy, Netherlands, Slovakia, Spain & Sweden.
