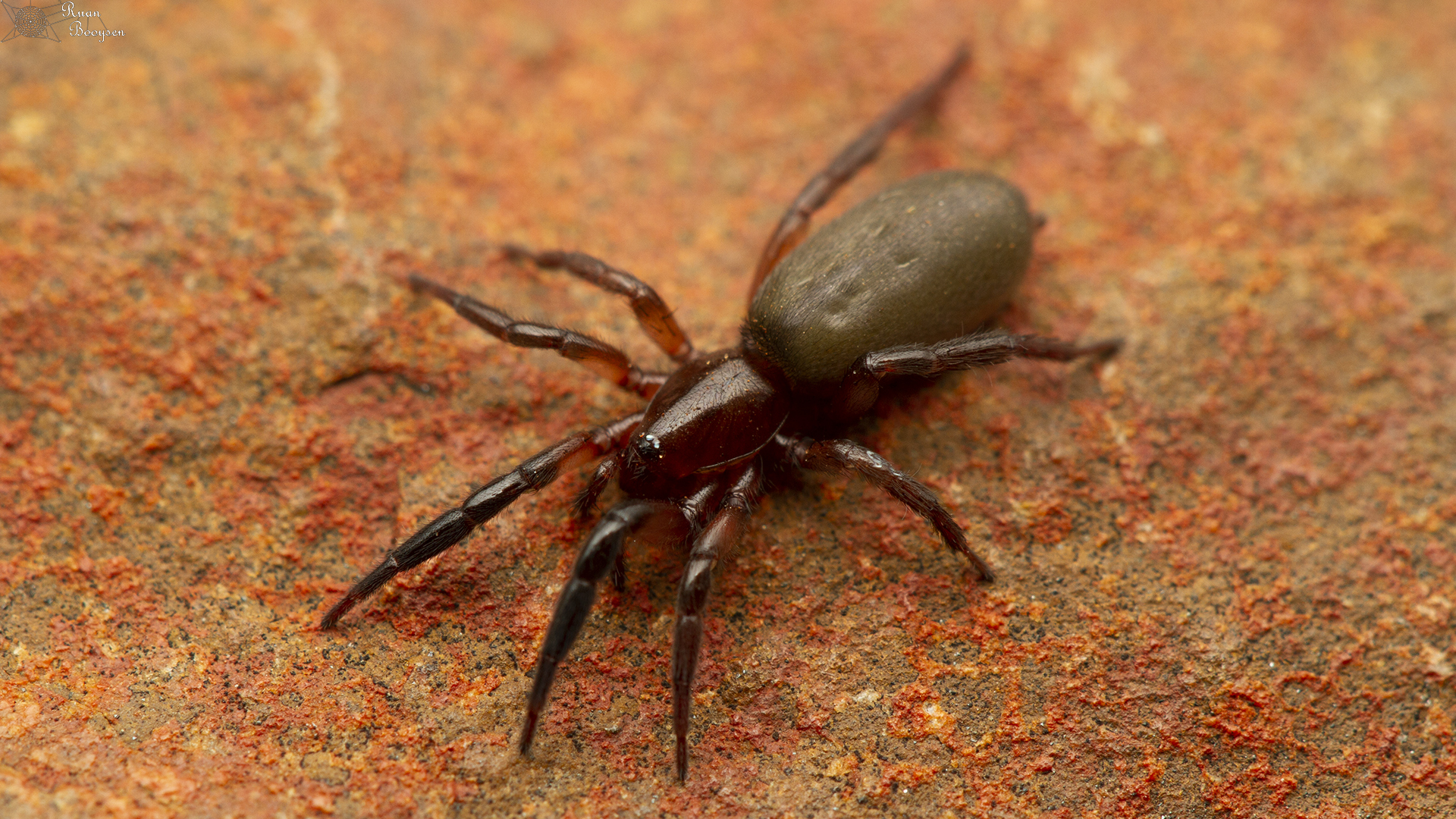
- A female Zelotes corrugatus in South Africa

Scientific classification
- Kingdom: Animalia
- Phylum: Arthropoda
- Subphylum: Chelicerata
- Class: Arachnida
- Order: Araneae
- Infraorder: Araneomorphae
- Family: Gnaphosidae
- Genus: Zelotes
- Species: Z. corrugatus

Binomial name
- Zelotes corrugatus (Purcell, 1907)

Synonyms
- Melanophora corrugata Purcell, 1907; Camillina corrugata Tucker, 1923

= Zelotes corrugatus =

Common Dark Ground Spider

Species of spider

Zelotes corrugatus is a species of spider in the family Gnaphosidae. It is commonly known as the common dark ground spider.

== Distribution ==
Zelotes corrugatus is an African endemic distributed across Botswana, Namibia, Zambia, Zimbabwe, and South Africa. The species is common and in South Africa has been recorded from all nine provinces, at altitudes ranging from 26 to 1,752 m above sea level.

The species was originally described from Hanover in the Northern Cape and has a widespread distribution across the country.

== Habitat and ecology ==
The species inhabits the Fynbos, Grassland, Nama Karoo, and Savanna biomes. These are free-running ground spiders that are found under stones during the day.

== Conservation ==
Zelotes corrugatus is listed as Least Concern by the South African National Biodiversity Institute due to its wide geographic range. There are no significant threats to the species and it is protected in more than 10 protected areas.

== Taxonomy ==
The species was originally described by Purcell in 1907 from Hanover as Melanophora corrugata. It was transferred to Camillina by Tucker in 1923, and later to Zelotes by FitzPatrick in 2007. The species is known from both sexes.
