= C. europaea =

C. europaea may refer to:

- Camillina europaea, a spider species found in Italy
- Caralluma europaea, a plant species in the genus Caralluma
- Cuscuta europaea, the greater dodder, a parasitic plant species native to Europe
