= Camillina pulchra =

Scientific classification
- Domain: Eukaryota
- Kingdom: Animalia
- Phylum: Arthropoda
- Subphylum: Chelicerata
- Class: Arachnida
- Order: Araneae
- Infraorder: Araneomorphae
- Family: Gnaphosidae
- Genus: Camillina
- Species: C. pulchra

Binomial name
- Camillina pulchra (Keyserling, 1891)

Species of spider

Camillina pulchra is a species of ground spider in the family Gnaphosidae. It is found in Brazil, Argentina, and has been introduced into the United States.
