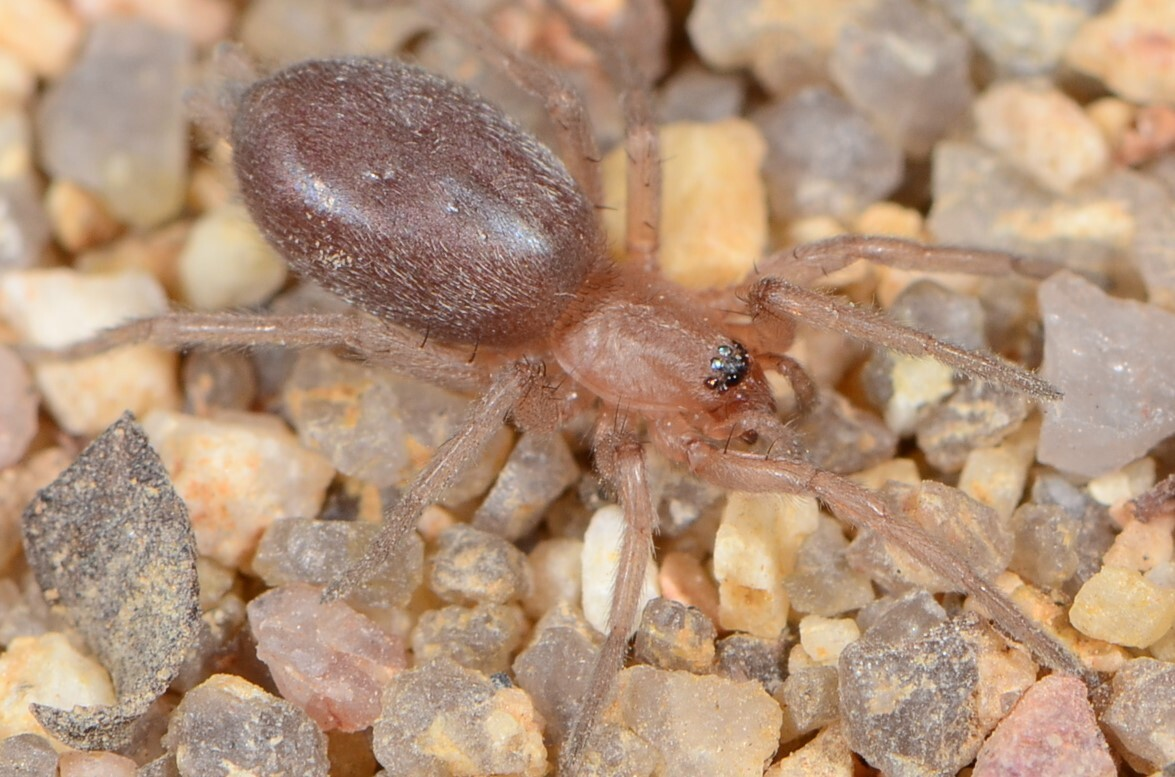
- female
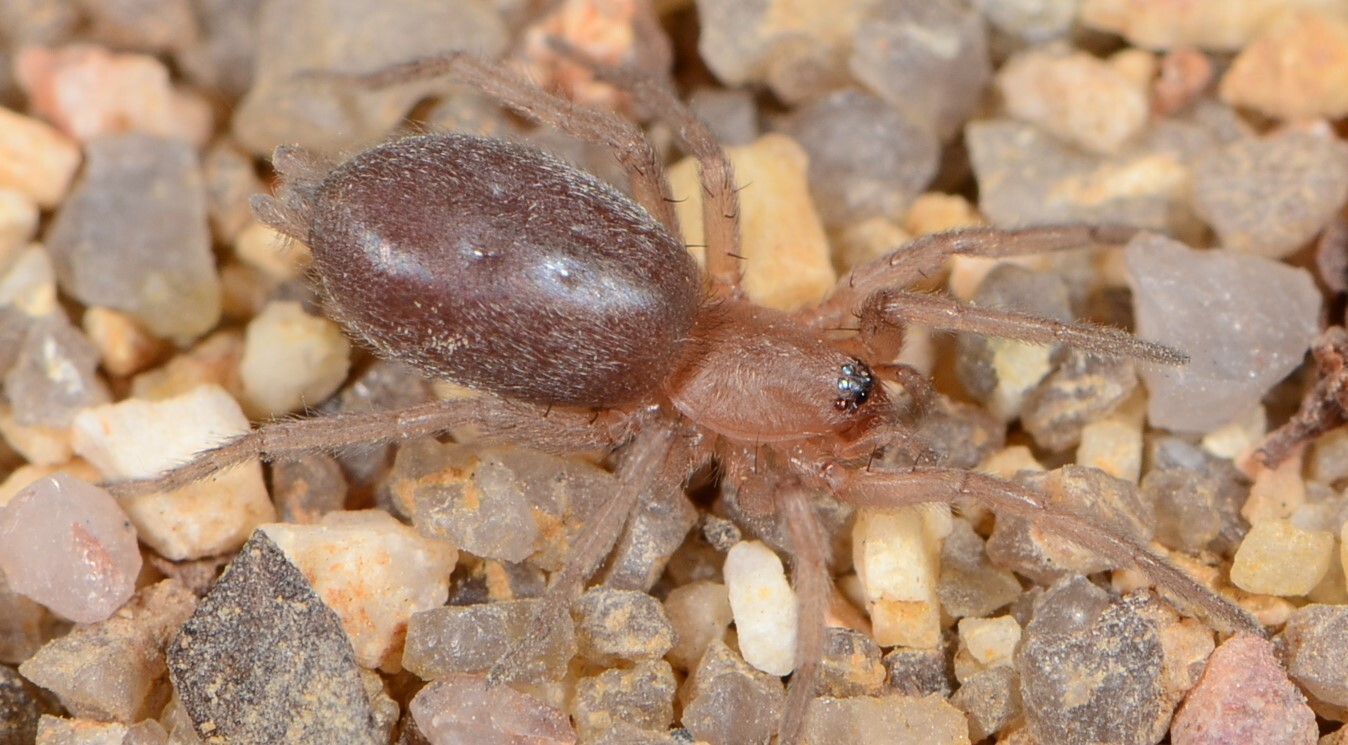
- female

Scientific classification
- Kingdom: Animalia
- Phylum: Arthropoda
- Subphylum: Chelicerata
- Class: Arachnida
- Order: Araneae
- Infraorder: Araneomorphae
- Family: Gnaphosidae
- Genus: Camillina
- Species: C. procurva

Binomial name
- Camillina procurva (Purcell, 1908)

Synonyms
- Melanophora procurva Purcell, 1908

= Camillina procurva =

Kamaggas Pearly-Eyed Ground Spider

Species of spider

Camillina procurva is a species of spider in the family Gnaphosidae. It is found in Namibia and South Africa and is commonly known as the Kamaggas pearly-eyed ground spider.

== Distribution ==
Camillina procurva occurs in Namibia and South Africa.

In South Africa, it is found in Eastern Cape, Limpopo, Mpumalanga, Northern Cape, and Western Cape.

== Habitat and ecology ==
The species is a free-living ground dweller found at altitudes ranging from 164 to 1,909 m above sea level. It has been sampled from Fynbos, Grassland, Nama Karoo, Savanna, and Succulent Karoo biomes.

== Conservation ==
Camillina procurva is listed as Least Concern by the South African National Biodiversity Institute due to its wide distribution range. The species is protected in several areas including Polokwane Nature Reserve, Verloren Vallei Nature Reserve, Cederberg Wilderness Area, De Hoop Nature Reserve, and Anysberg Nature Reserve.

== Taxonomy ==
The species was described by W. F. Purcell in 1908 as Melanophora procurva from Kamaggas in the Northern Cape. It was revised by Platnick & Murphy in 1987.
