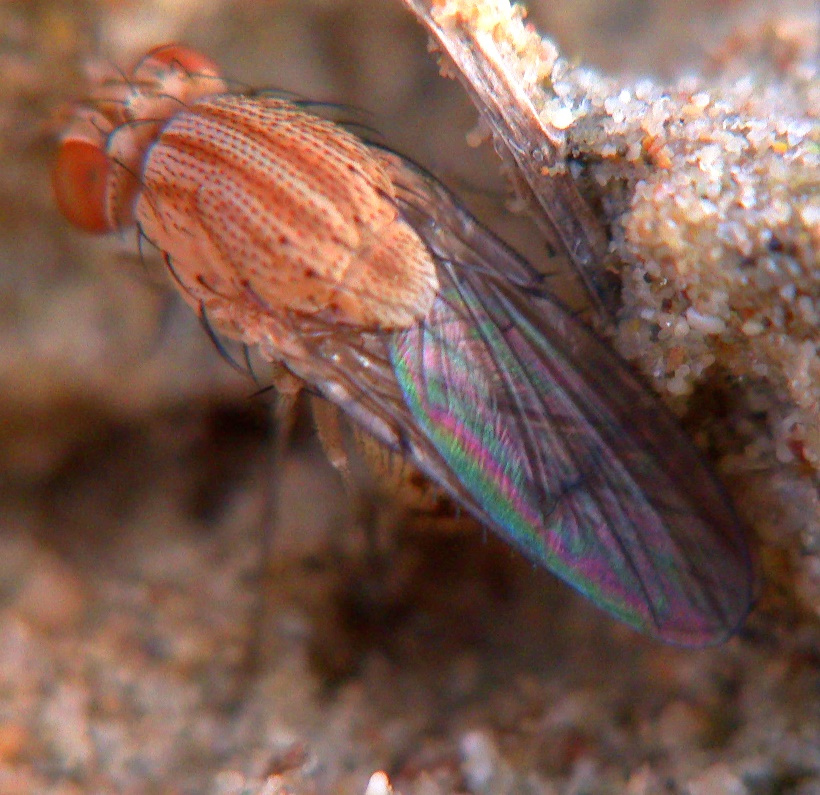
- Curtonotum simile

Scientific classification
- Domain: Eukaryota
- Kingdom: Animalia
- Phylum: Arthropoda
- Class: Insecta
- Order: Diptera
- Family: Curtonotidae
- Genus: Curtonotum; Macquart, 1843

= Curtonotum =

Genus of flies

Curtonotum is a genus of flies in the family Curtonotidae. There are more than 50 described species in Curtonotum.

== Selected species ==
- Curtonotum amurense Ozerov, 2007
- Curtonotum angolense Tsacas, 1977
- Curtonotum angustipenne (Meijere, 1911)
- Curtonotum anus (Meigen, 1830)
- Curtonotum apicale Hendel, 1913
- Curtonotum arenatum (Osten Sacken, 1882)
- Curtonotum balachowski Tsacas, 1974
- Curtonotum bathmedum Hendel, 1913
- Curtonotum boeny Tsacas, 1974
- Curtonotum brevicorne (Duda, 1939)
- Curtonotum campsiphallum Tsacas, 1977
- Curtonotum ceylonense Delfinado, 1969
- Curtonotum coriaceum (Hendel, 1932)
- Curtonotum curtispinum Klymko & Marshall
- Curtonotum cuthbertsoni Duda, 1935
- Curtonotum decumanum Bezzi, 1914
- Curtonotum desperatum Klymko & Marshall
- Curtonotum flavisetum Klymko & Marshall
- Curtonotum fumipenne Hendel, 1913
- Curtonotum fuscipenne (Macquart, 1843)
- Curtonotum gibbum (Fabricius, 1805)
- Curtonotum helvum (Loew, 1862) (curtonotid fly)
- Curtonotum hendeli Malloch, 1930
- Curtonotum hendelianum (Enderlein, 1917)
- Curtonotum herrero Tsacas, 1977
- Curtonotum hunkingi Klymko & Marshall
- Curtonotum impunctatum Hendel, 1913
- Curtonotum keiseri Tsacas, 1974
- Curtonotum maai Delfinado, 1969
- Curtonotum maculiventre (Enderlein, 1917)
- Curtonotum magnum Malloch, 1930
- Curtonotum maritimum Ozerov, 2007
- Curtonotum murinum Hendel, 1913
- Curtonotum neoangustipenne Dwivedi & Gupta, 1979
- Curtonotum nigripalpe Hendel, 1936
- Curtonotum pantherinum (Walker, 1849)
- Curtonotum papillatum Klymko & Marshall
- Curtonotum pauliani Tsacas, 1974
- Curtonotum platyphallum Tsacas, 1977
- Curtonotum punctithorax Fischer, 1933
- Curtonotum quinquevittatum Curran, 1933
- Curtonotum saheliense Tsacas, 1977
- Curtonotum sakalava Tsacas, 1974
- Curtonotum salinum Curran, 1934
- Curtonotum sao Tsacas, 1977
- Curtonotum scambum Klymko & Marshall
- Curtonotum shatalkini Ozerov, 2007
- Curtonotum simile Tsacas, 1977
- Curtonotum simplex Schiner, 1868
- Curtonotum sternithrix Tsacas, 1974
- Curtonotum striatifrons Malloch, 1930
- Curtonotum stuckenbergi Tsacas, 1974
- Curtonotum taeniatum Hendel, 1913
- Curtonotum tigrinum Seguy, 1933
- Curtonotum trypetipenne Hendel, 1913
- Curtonotum tumidum Enderlein, 1917
- Curtonotum vulpinum Hendel, 1913
- † Curtonotum electrodominicum Grimaldi & Kirk-Spriggs, 2012
