= Diastata =

- Diastata costata (video)

Scientific classification
- Kingdom: Animalia
- Phylum: Arthropoda
- Clade: Pancrustacea
- Class: Insecta
- Order: Diptera
- Family: Diastatidae
- Subfamily: Diastatinae
- Genus: Diastata; Meigen, 1830

Type species
- Geomyza obscurella Fallén, 1823

Genus of flies

Diastata is a genus of flies in the family Diastatidae.

== Species ==
- Diastata adusta Meigen, 1830
- Diastata boreonigra Chandler, 1987
- Diastata cervinala Chandler, 1987
- Diastata costata Meigen, 1830
- Diastata flavicosta Chandler, 1987
- Diastata fuscula (Fallén, 1823)
- Diastata inornata Loew, 1864
- Diastata nebulosa (Fallén, 1823)
- Diastata ornata Meigen, 1830
- Diastata vagans Loew, 1864
