= Camillina pavesii =

Pavesi's Pearly-Eyed Ground Spider

Conservation status
- Least Concern (SANBI Red List)

Scientific classification
- Kingdom: Animalia
- Phylum: Arthropoda
- Subphylum: Chelicerata
- Class: Arachnida
- Order: Araneae
- Infraorder: Araneomorphae
- Family: Gnaphosidae
- Genus: Camillina
- Species: C. pavesii

Binomial name
- Camillina pavesii (Simon, 1897)

Species of spider

Camillina pavesii is a species of spider in the family Gnaphosidae. It has a wide distribution from Ethiopia to South Africa and is commonly known as Pavesi's pearly-eyed ground spider.

== Etymology ==
The species name pavesii honors Italian zoologist Pietro Pavesi (1844–1907).

The specific epithet, pavesii, is a patronymic created to honor the Italian zoologist Pietro Pavesi (1844–1907). Pavesi was a professor at the University of Pavia and a prolific naturalist who contributed significantly to the early documentation of arachnids in Europe and Africa.

The genus name Camillina was established by Jacques Berland in 1919. While Berland did not explicitly state the derivation, in the context of early 20th-century arachnology, such names were often diminutive forms of existing genera or derived from Latin roots; however, it is most frequently cited in taxonomic literature simply as the established container for this specific group of ground spiders.

== Distribution ==
Camillina pavesii is widespread throughout Africa. In South Africa, it is recorded from three provinces: Limpopo, Mpumalanga, and Western Cape.

== Habitat and ecology ==
The species is a free-living ground dweller found at altitudes ranging from 15 to 2,066 m above sea level. It has been sampled from Grassland and Savanna biomes.

== Description ==
C. pavesii is known from both sexes.

== Conservation ==
Camillina pavesii is listed as Least Concern by the South African National Biodiversity Institute due to its wide range. The species is protected in De Hoop Nature Reserve and Blouberg Nature Reserve.

== Taxonomy ==
The species was described by Simon in 1897 from Ethiopia as Echemus pavesii. It was revised by Platnick & Murphy in 1987.
