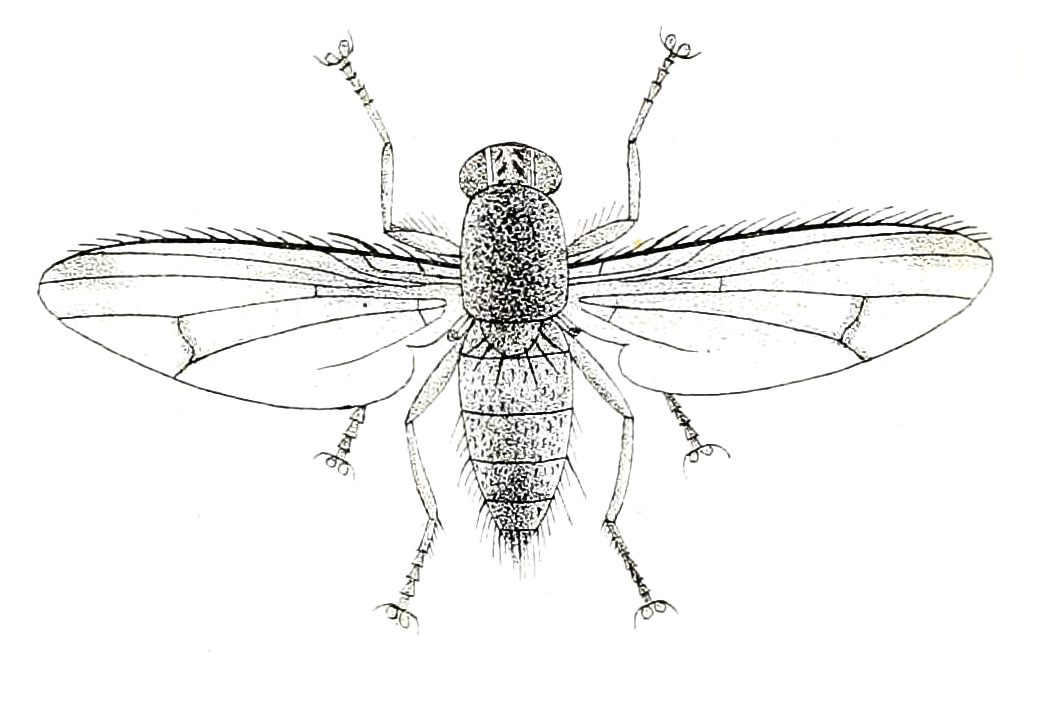
- Curtonota gibbum from Macquart, 1838 Insectes diptères exotiques nouveaux ou peu connus

Scientific classification
- Kingdom: Animalia
- Phylum: Arthropoda
- Clade: Pancrustacea
- Class: Insecta
- Order: Diptera
- Superfamily: Ephydroidea
- Family: Curtonotidae; Enderlein, 1914

Genera
- See text

= Curtonotidae =

Family of flies

The Curtotonidae or quasimodo flies are a small family of small grey to dark brown humpbacked flies (Diptera) with a worldwide distribution, but with very few species in the Nearctic, Australasian/Oceanian, and Palaearctic regions. Most members of the family are found in tropical to subtropical latitudes in Africa and the Neotropics. Many remain undescribed in collections, since little work on the family has been done since the 1930s.

== Description ==
For terms see Morphology of Diptera

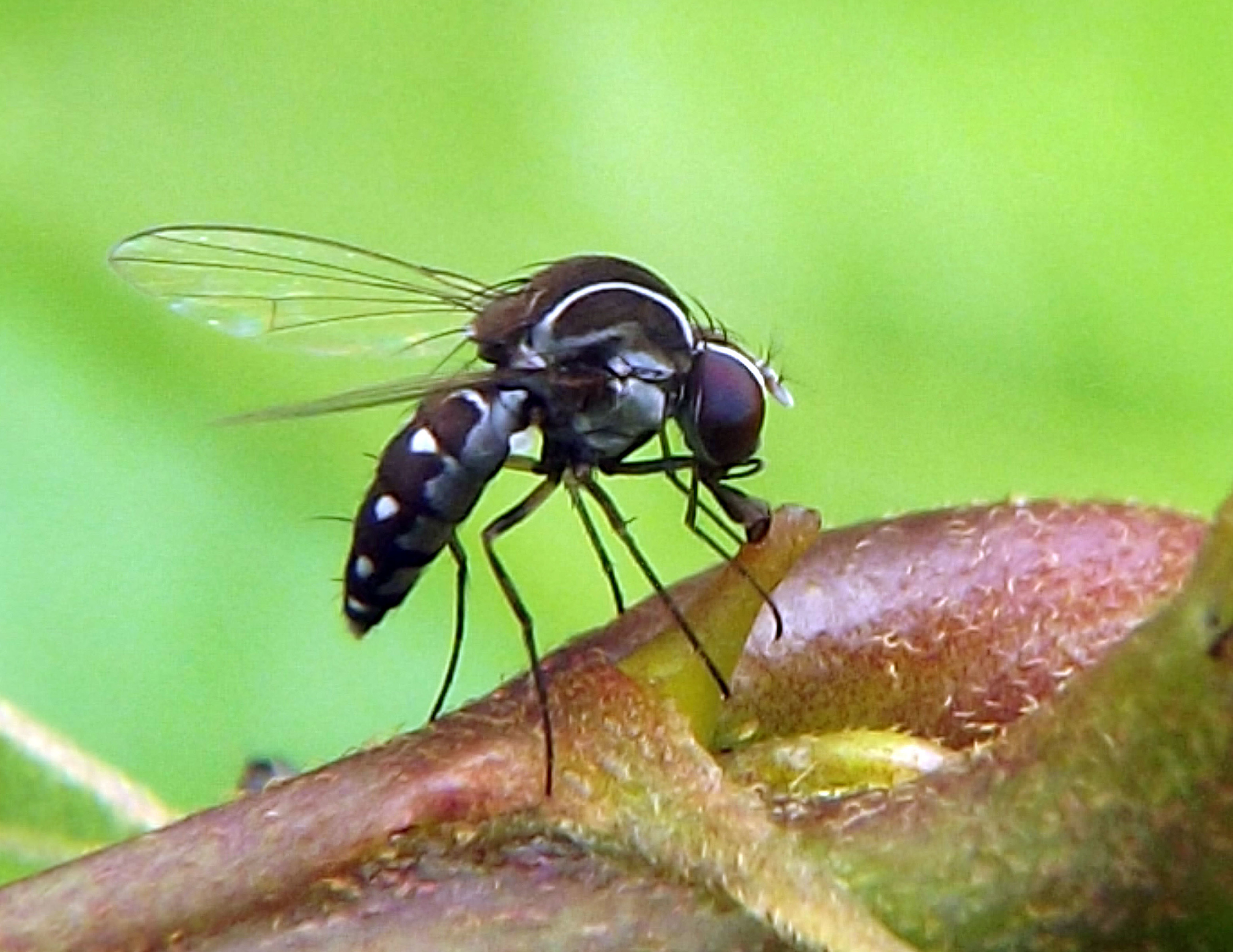
The typical profile

Medium-sized flies. The postvertical bristles on head are well developed and cruciate and there are three orbital bristles on head on each side of frons. Arista with long plumosity. Costa with two interruptions one more distal to the humeral crossvein and one before subcosta. Subcosta developed throughout its length up to costa. The posterior basal wing cell and discoidal wing cell are fused. The costa bears spinules.

== Classification ==
The family has at various times been placed in the Drosophilidae, Diastatidae, and Ephydridae. In 1934 Duda proposed the family name Curtonotidae and nowadays family rank is now widely accepted.

== Genera and Species ==
- Genus Axinota Wulp, 1886
  - A. kyphosis Kirk-Spriggs, 2010
  - A. obscuripes Meijere, 1911
  - A. pictiventris Wulp, 1886
  - A. rufipes Okada, 1966
  - A. sarawakensis Delfinado, 1969
  - A. simulans Delfinado, 1969
- Genus Curtonotum Macquart, 1844
  - C. adusticrus Klymko & Marshall, 2011
  - C. atlanticum Klymko & Marshall, 2011
  - C. balachowskyi Tsacas, 1974
  - C. bivittatum Klymko & Marshall, 2011
  - C. boeny Tsacas, 1974
  - C. brunneum Klymko & Marshall, 2011.
  - C. ceylonense Delfinado, 1969
  - C. coronaeformis Kirk-Spriggs, 2011
  - C. curtispinum Klymko & Marshall, 2011
  - C. desperatum Klymko & Marshall, 2011
  - C. flavisetum Klymko & Marshall, 2011
  - C. floridense Klymko & Marshall, 2011
  - C. gladiiformis Kirk-Spriggs, 2011
  - C. gracile Klymko & Marshall, 2011
  - C. griveaudi Kirk-Spriggs, 2011
  - C. hunkingi Klymko & Marshall, 2011
  - C. irwini Kirk-Spriggs, 2011
  - C. keiseri Tsacas, 1974
  - C. nigrum Klymko & Marshall, 2011
  - C. papillatum Klymko & Marshall, 2011
  - C. parkeri Kirk-Spriggs, 2011
  - C. pauliani Tsacas, 1974
  - C. rinhatinana Kirk-Spriggs, 2011
  - C. sakalava Tsacas, 1974
  - C. scambum Klymko & Marshall, 2011
  - C. sternithrix Tsacas, 1974
  - C. stuckenbergi Tsacas, 1974
- Genus Cyrtona Séguy, 1938
  - C. albomacula (Curran, 1933)
  - C. capensis Hackman, 1960
  - C. consobrina Hackman, 1960
  - C. pictipennis (Thomson 1869)
- Genus Tigrisomyia Kirk-Spriggs, 2010
  - T. amnoni Kirk-Spriggs, 2010
  - T. kinskii Kirk-Spriggs, 2010
  - T. rhayaderi Kirk-Spriggs, 2010
  - T. scoliosis Kirk-Spriggs, 2010

== Distribution ==
- Palaearctic 1 species
- Nearctic 1 species
- Australasian/Oceanian 1 species
- Afrotropical many species

== Biology ==
Curtonotum simile oviposits into wet sand under a Acacia in the Al Marmoum Conservation Reserve, Dubai, UAE.

Greathead (1958) records the immature stages as scavengers within egg pods of the desert locust, Schistocerca gregaria . Cuthbertson (1936) reared an Afrotropical species, Cyrtona albomacula Curran, from human faeces in Zimbabwe. Others have been found in the burrows of warthogs and ant bears.

== Fossils ==
Only one fossil species of Curtonotidae is known, Curtonotum gigas Théobald, from Oligocene deposits in France.

== Identification ==
- Duda, O. (1934), Curtonotidae 6, 1,58d, 1-5 In: Lindner, E. (Ed.). Die Fliegen der Paläarktischen Region 6: 1–115. Keys to Palaearctic species but now needs revision (in German).
- A.A. Stackelberg Family Curtonotidae in Bei-Bienko, G. Ya, 1988 Keys to the insects of the European Part of the USSR Volume 5 (Diptera) Part 2 English edition. Keys to Palaearctic species but now needs revision.

== Phylogeny ==
- Ephydroidea
  - Curtonotidae
  - - Drosophilidae+Camillidae
    - - Ephydridae
      - Diastatidae sensu lato

McAlpine (1989)

- Ephydroidea
  - - Curtonotidae+Drosophilidae
  - - Campichoetidae
    - - Ephydridae+Camillidae
      - Diastatidae

Grimaldi (1990)

== Gallery ==
See images at and at Diptera.info

== References and sources ==
- McAlpine, J. P. (ed.), 1981–89.Manual of Nearctic Diptera. Research Branch, Agriculture Canada Monograph
- Papp, L. 1998. Family Curtonotidae. I: Papp, L. and Darvas, B. (Ed.). Contributions to a Manual of Palaearctic Diptera. 3: 497–502. Science Herald, Budapest.
- no:Curtonotidae
- Pollck, J.N., 2002 Observations on the biology and anatomy of Curtonotidae (Diptera: Schizophora), by J. N. Pollock Journal of Natural History, 36,14:1725 - 1745.New information concerning the biology and anatomy of Curtonotum quinquevittatum. During the hot, dry season the latter species leaves its warthog burrow refuges at night. Cyrtona spp. rest in densely shaded humid habitats during the same season, dispersing in the cooler parts of the year.
- Meier, R., Kotrba, M., Barber, K. 1997. On the natural history and morphology of the egg, first instar larva, puparium, and female reproductive system of Curtonotum helvum (Curtonotidae; Ephydroidea; Diptera). American Museum Novitates 3219:1-20.
- Greathead, D.J., Kooyman, C., Launois-Luong, M.H. and Popov, G.B., 1994. Les ennemis naturels des criquets du Sahel ES collection Acridologie Opérationnelle no 8 (1994) Some information on Curtonotidae on pp. 17–18.
- Kirk-Spriggs, A.H. & Freidberg, A. 2007. The Palaearctic species of Curtonotidae (Diptera: Schizophora), with special reference to the fauna of Israel. Bulletin de l’Institut r. des sciences naturelles de Belgique (Entomologie) 77: 133–146.
