= Camillina elegans =

Scientific classification
- Kingdom: Animalia
- Phylum: Arthropoda
- Subphylum: Chelicerata
- Class: Arachnida
- Order: Araneae
- Infraorder: Araneomorphae
- Family: Gnaphosidae
- Genus: Camillina
- Species: C. elegans

Binomial name
- Camillina elegans (E.B.Bryant, 1940)

Synonyms
- Eilicina elegans Bryant, 1940; Drassyllus elegans (Bryant, 1940)

Species of spider

Camillina elegans is a spider species in the family Gnaphosidae. It is native to the Caribbean, and has been introduced to Angola and the Pacific Islands.

== Taxonomy ==
It was first described by Elizabeth B. Bryant in 1940 as Eilicina elegans. In 1980, it was transferred to the genus Drassyllus and in 1982, the same authors placed it in Camillina.

== Description ==
Spiders in the genus Camillina are distinguished by a combination of features: a preening comb on the metatarsi of the third and fourth legs; the posterior median eyes are large and almost touch; and the male palpal bulb and the female epigyne have distinctive features. Males of Camillina elegans have a long spur on the prolateral side of the embolus of the palpal bulb. Females have long ducts coiled around the spermathecae.

Males have a body averaging about 3 mm (0.12 in) long. Females are slightly larger, averaging about 3.3 mm (0.13 in).

== Distribution ==
Camillina elegans is described as "widespread" in the West Indies, south to Curaçao. It is also common in Florida, where it may have been introduced. It has been introduced to Hawaii, the Marshall Islands and Angola.
