= Camillina capensis =

Cape Pearly-Eyed Ground Spider

Conservation status
- Least Concern (SANBI Red List)

Scientific classification
- Kingdom: Animalia
- Phylum: Arthropoda
- Subphylum: Chelicerata
- Class: Arachnida
- Order: Araneae
- Infraorder: Araneomorphae
- Family: Gnaphosidae
- Genus: Camillina
- Species: C. capensis

Binomial name
- Camillina capensis Platnick & Murphy, 1987

Species of spider

Camillina capensis is a species of spider in the family Gnaphosidae. It is endemic to South Africa and is commonly known as the Cape pearly-eyed ground spider.

== Distribution ==
Camillina capensis is endemic to South Africa, where it occurs in three provinces: Eastern Cape, Gauteng, and Western Cape.

== Habitat and ecology ==
The species is a free-living ground dweller found at altitudes ranging from 56 to 1,333 m above sea level. It has been sampled from Grassland, Nama Karoo, Savanna, and Thicket biomes.

== Description ==
C. capensis is known from both sexes.

== Conservation ==
Camillina capensis is listed as Least Concern by the South African National Biodiversity Institute due to its wide geographic range. The species is protected in Mountain Zebra National Park and Swartberg Nature Reserve.

== Taxonomy ==
The species was described by Platnick & Murphy in 1987 from Pineapple Research Station, East London.
