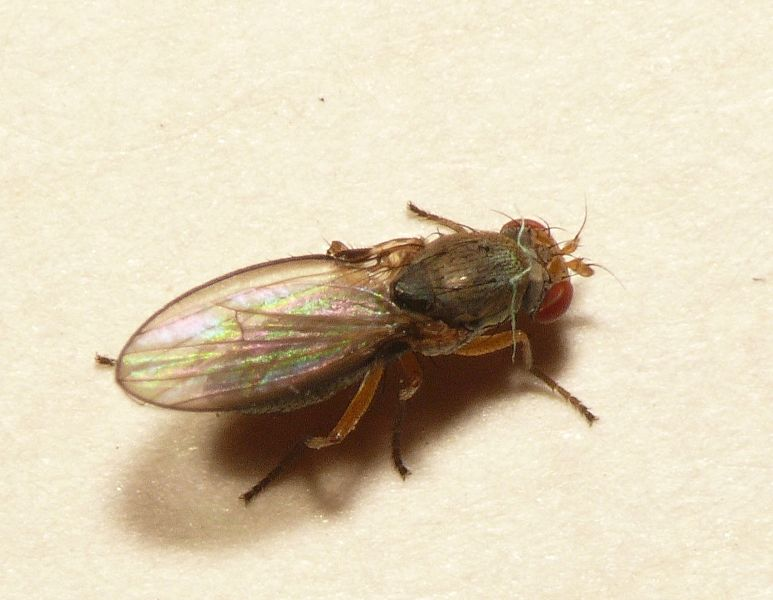
- Diastata costata Netherlands

Scientific classification
- Kingdom: Animalia
- Phylum: Arthropoda
- Class: Insecta
- Order: Diptera
- Family: Diastatidae
- Genus: Diastata
- Species: D. costata

Binomial name
- Diastata costata Meigen, 1830

= Diastata costata =

Species of fly

Diastata costata is a species of fly in the family Diastatidae. It is found in the Palearctic.
