= Camillina biplagia =

Pearly-Eyed Ground Spider

Conservation status
- Least Concern (SANBI Red List)

Scientific classification
- Kingdom: Animalia
- Phylum: Arthropoda
- Subphylum: Chelicerata
- Class: Arachnida
- Order: Araneae
- Infraorder: Araneomorphae
- Family: Gnaphosidae
- Genus: Camillina
- Species: C. biplagia

Binomial name
- Camillina biplagia Tucker, 1923

Species of spider

Camillina biplagia is a species of spider in the family Gnaphosidae. It is endemic to South Africa and is commonly known as the pearly-eyed ground spider.

== Distribution ==
Camillina biplagia is endemic to South Africa, where it occurs in five provinces: Eastern Cape, KwaZulu-Natal, Northern Cape, North West, and Western Cape.

== Habitat and ecology ==
The species is a free-living ground dweller found at altitudes ranging from sea level to 1,205 m above sea level. It has been sampled from Fynbos, Nama Karoo, Savanna, Succulent Karoo, and Thicket biomes.

== Description ==
C. biplagia is known from both sexes.

== Conservation ==
Camillina biplagia is listed as Least Concern by the South African National Biodiversity Institute due to its wide distribution range. The species is protected in four protected areas: Mountain Zebra National Park, Ndumo Game Reserve, Tembe Elephant Park, and Table Mountain National Park.

== Taxonomy ==
The species was described by Tucker in 1923 from Great Winterhoek Mountains. It was revised by Platnick & Murphy in 1987.
