= Camillina maun =

Botswana Pearly-Eyed Ground Spider

Scientific classification
- Kingdom: Animalia
- Phylum: Arthropoda
- Subphylum: Chelicerata
- Class: Arachnida
- Order: Araneae
- Infraorder: Araneomorphae
- Family: Gnaphosidae
- Genus: Camillina
- Species: C. maun

Binomial name
- Camillina maun Platnick & Murphy, 1987

Species of spider

Camillina maun is a species of spider in the family Gnaphosidae. It is found in several African countries and is commonly known as the Botswana pearly-eyed ground spider.

== Distribution ==
Camillina maun occurs in Botswana, Namibia, Zambia, and South Africa. In South Africa, it is found in seven of the nine provinces.

== Habitat and ecology ==
The species is a free-living ground dweller. It has been sampled from Forest, Grassland, and Savanna biomes at altitudes ranging from 93 to 1,674 m above sea level.

== Conservation ==
Camillina maun is listed as Least Concern by the South African National Biodiversity Institute due to its wide distribution range. The species is protected in more than ten protected areas.

== Taxonomy ==
The species was described by Platnick & Murphy in 1987 from Botswana. It was revised by the same authors.
