= Camillina setosa =

Hairy Pearly-Eyed Ground Spider

Conservation status
- Least Concern (SANBI Red List)

Scientific classification
- Kingdom: Animalia
- Phylum: Arthropoda
- Subphylum: Chelicerata
- Class: Arachnida
- Order: Araneae
- Infraorder: Araneomorphae
- Family: Gnaphosidae
- Genus: Camillina
- Species: C. setosa

Binomial name
- Camillina setosa Tucker, 1923

Species of spider

Camillina setosa is a species of spider in the family Gnaphosidae. It is endemic to South Africa and is commonly known as the hairy pearly-eyed ground spider.

== Etymology ==
The species name setosa is Latin for "hairy" or "bristly".

== Distribution ==
Camillina setosa is endemic to South Africa, where it occurs in three provinces: KwaZulu-Natal, Mpumalanga, and Western Cape.

== Habitat and ecology ==
The species is a free-living ground dweller found at altitudes ranging from 84 to 1,795 m above sea level. It has been sampled from Fynbos, Nama Karoo, Indian Ocean Coastal Belt, Grassland, and Savanna biomes. The species has also been collected from sugarcane plantations in KwaZulu-Natal.

== Description ==
C. setosa is known from both sexes.

== Conservation ==
Camillina setosa is listed as Least Concern by the South African National Biodiversity Institute due to its wide range. The species is protected in Kruger National Park, Swartberg Nature Reserve, Witteberg Nature Reserve, and Table Mountain National Park.

== Taxonomy ==
The species was described by Tucker in 1923 from Signal Hill in Cape Town. It was revised by Platnick & Murphy in 1987.
