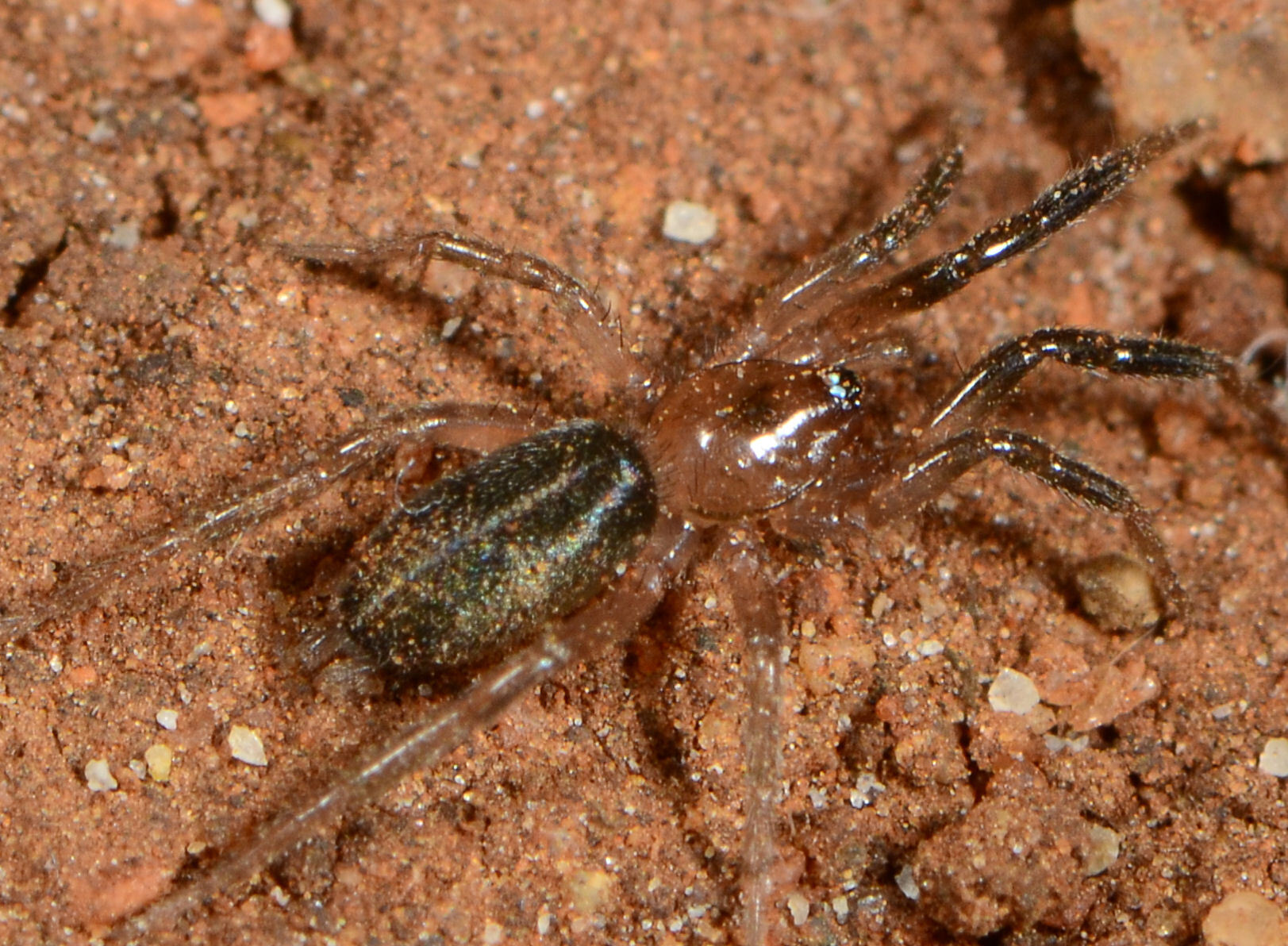
- female
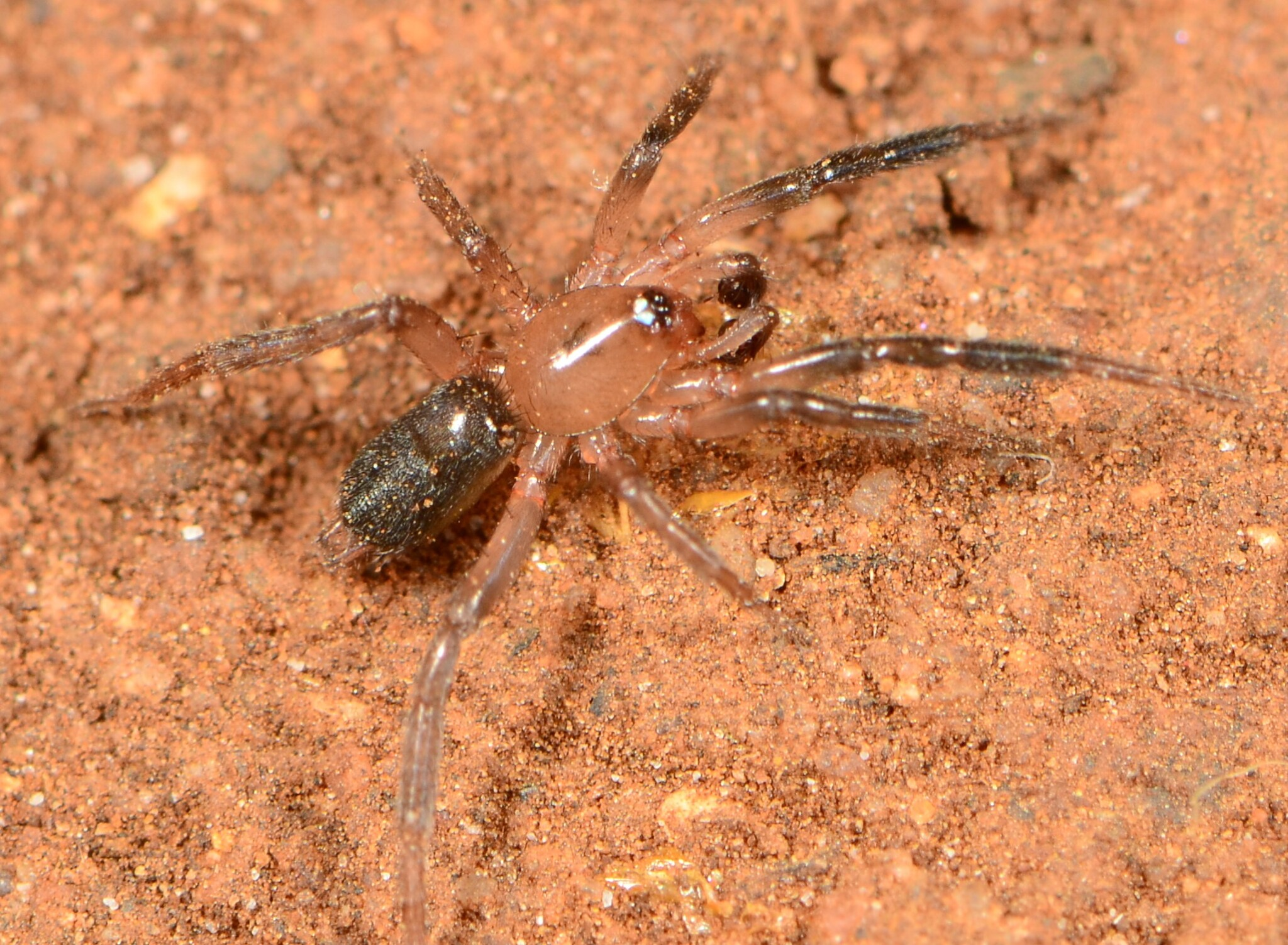
- male

Scientific classification
- Kingdom: Animalia
- Phylum: Arthropoda
- Subphylum: Chelicerata
- Class: Arachnida
- Order: Araneae
- Infraorder: Araneomorphae
- Family: Gnaphosidae
- Genus: Camillina
- Species: C. cordifera

Binomial name
- Camillina cordifera (Tullgren, 1910)

Synonyms
- Camillina natalensis Lawrence, 1938

= Camillina cordifera =

Common African Pearly-Eyed Ground Spider

Species of spider

Camillina cordifera is a species of spider in the family Gnaphosidae. It has a wide distribution across Africa and is commonly known as the common African pearly-eyed ground spider.

== Distribution ==
Camillina cordifera is widespread throughout Africa, recorded from South Africa, Lesotho, Botswana, Zimbabwe, Zambia, and Malawi. In South Africa, it occurs in all provinces.

== Habitat and ecology ==
The species is a free-living ground dweller found at altitudes ranging from 29 to 2,398 m above sea level. It has been sampled from all floral biomes except Desert and Succulent Karoo. The species has also been collected from citrus, cotton, maize, pistachio, and sunflower fields.

== Description ==
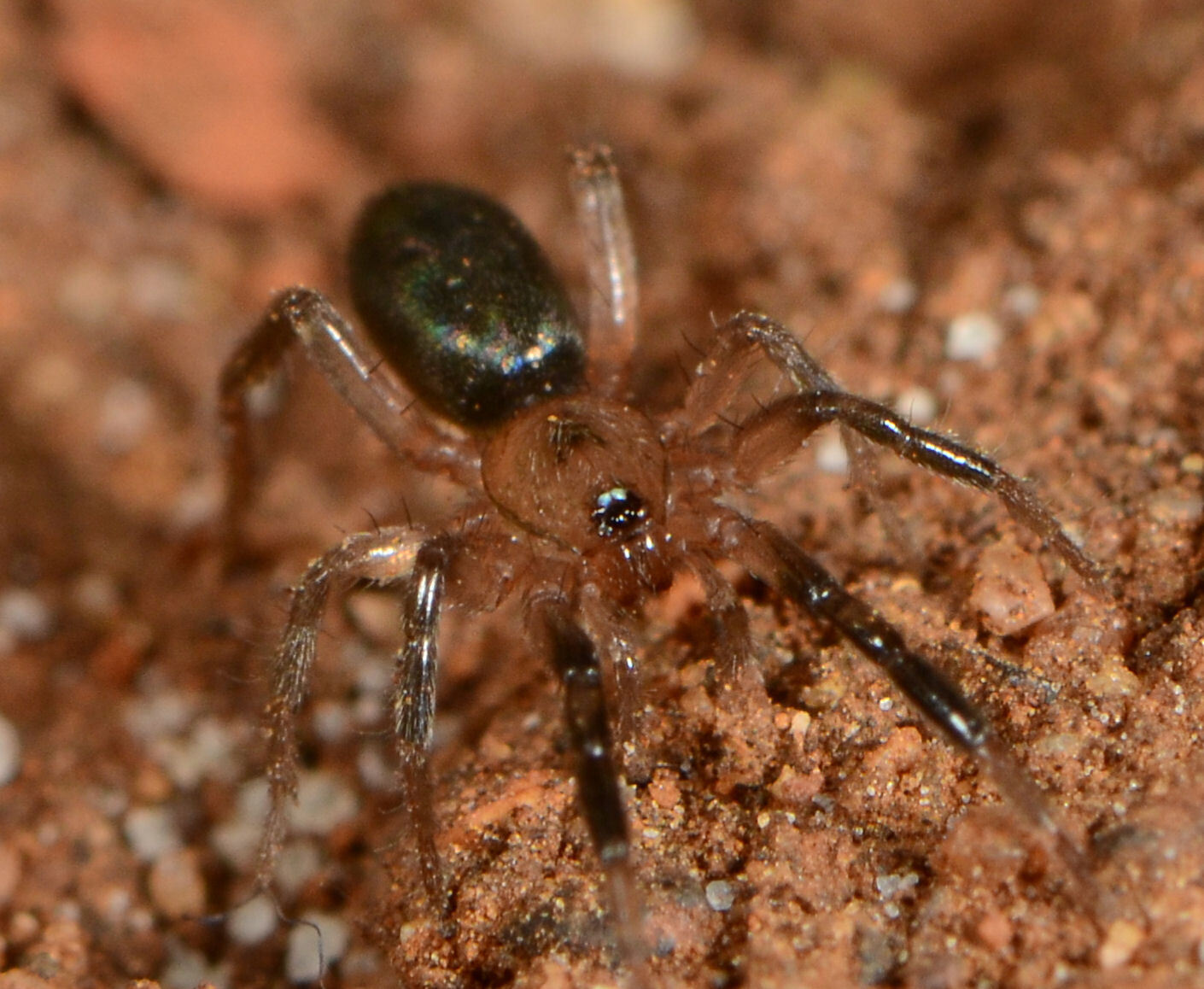
female

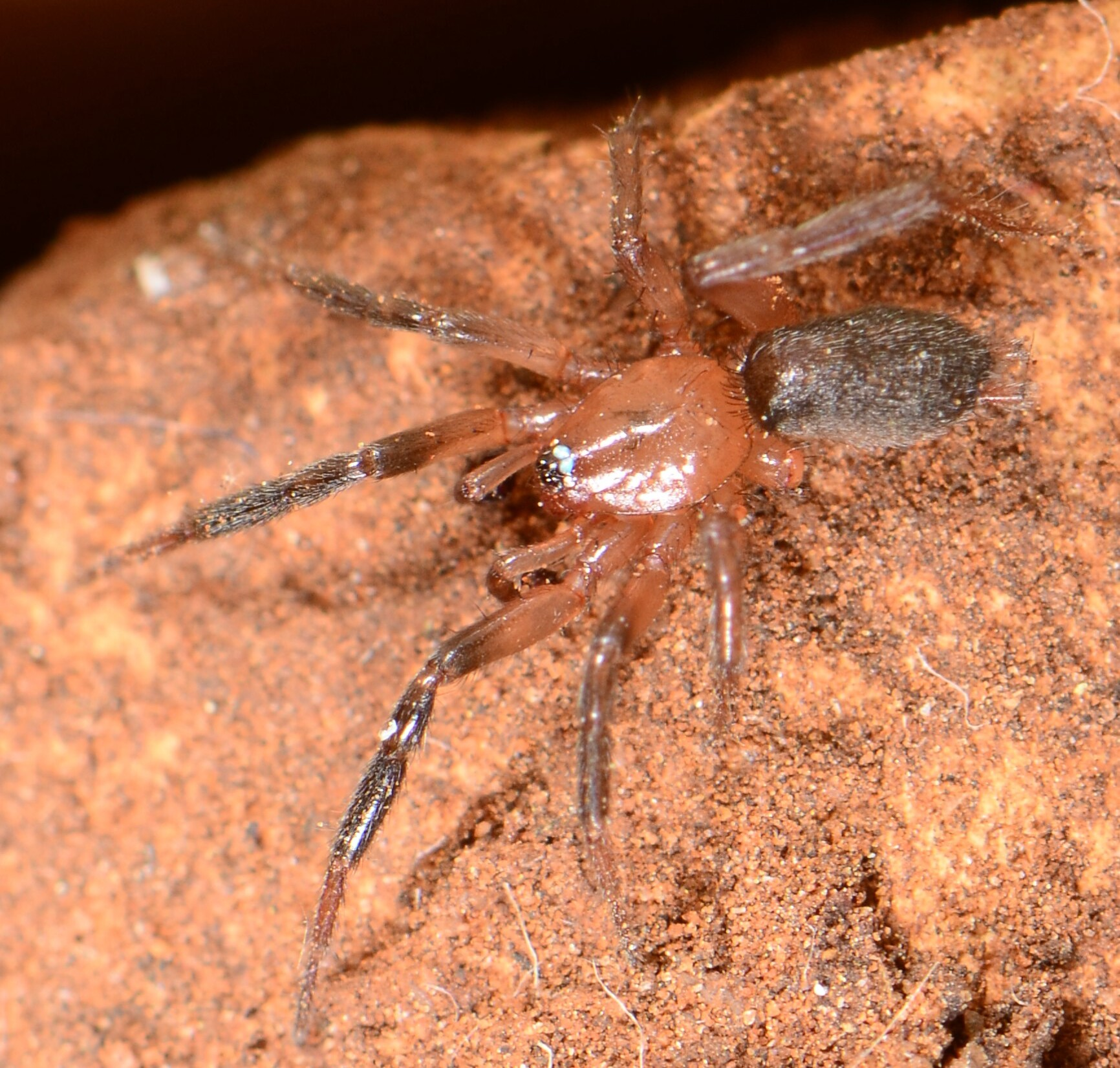
male

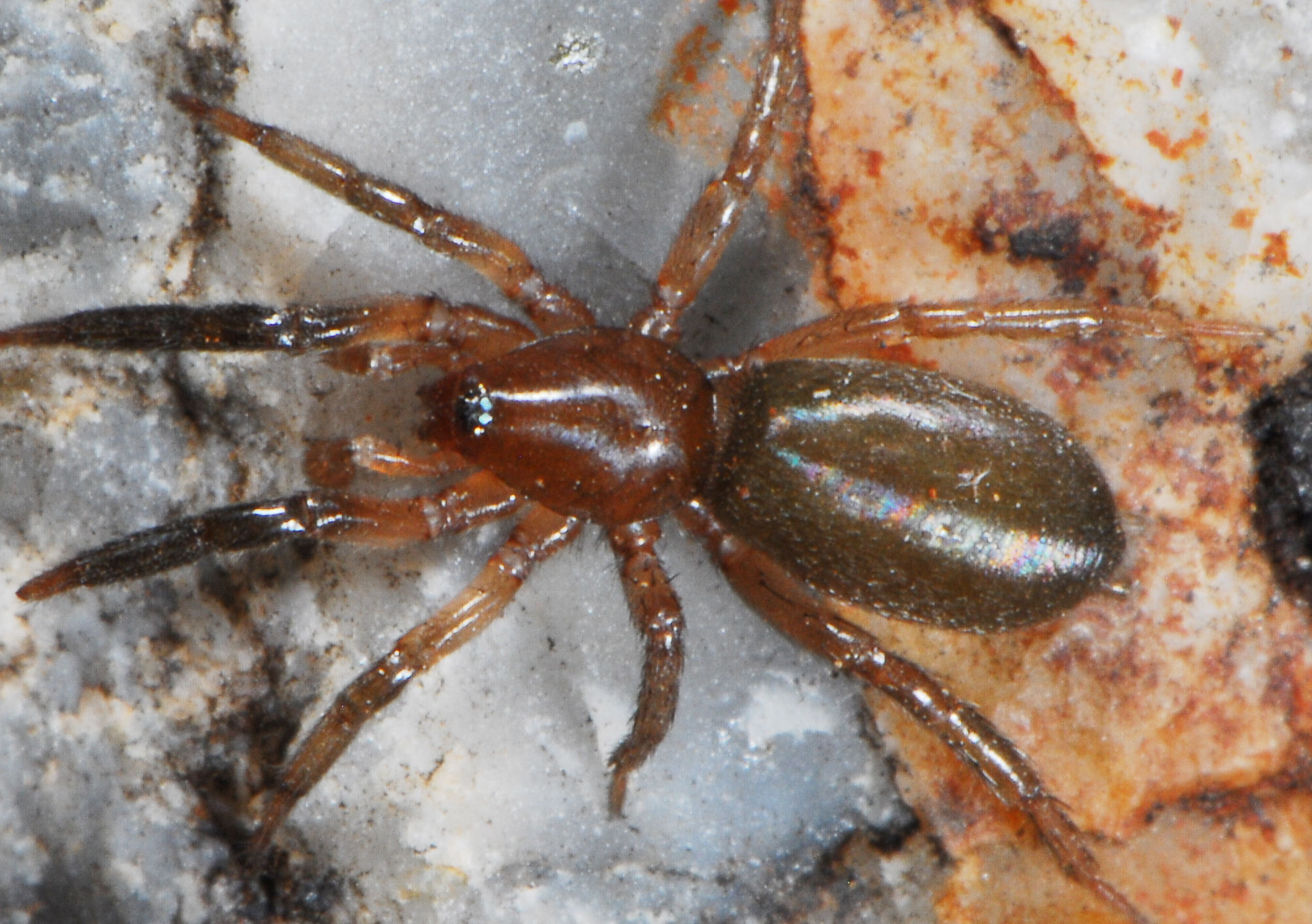
juvenile male

== Conservation ==
Camillina cordifera is listed as Least Concern by the South African National Biodiversity Institute due to its wide global range. The species is protected in more than ten protected areas.

== Taxonomy ==
The species was described by Tullgren in 1910 from Tanzania. It was revised by Platnick & Murphy in 1987, who synonymized Camillina natalensis Lawrence, 1938 with this species.
