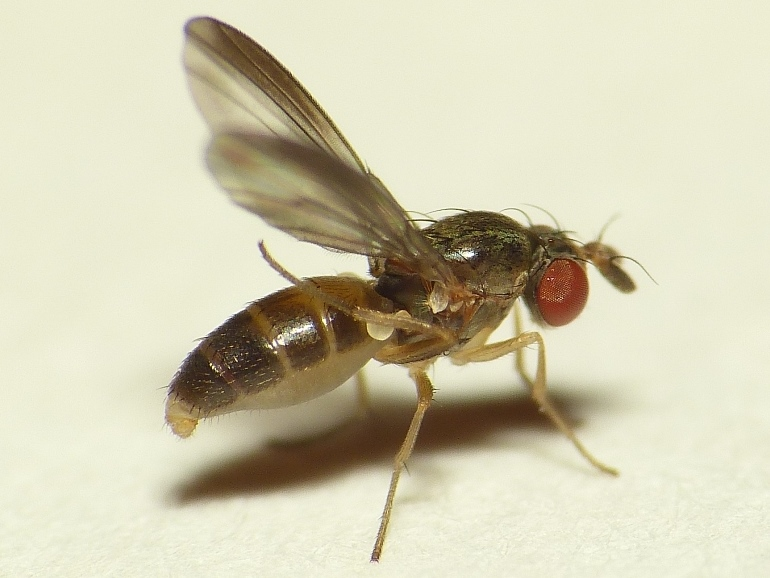
- Campichoeta obscuripennis

Scientific classification
- Kingdom: Animalia
- Phylum: Arthropoda
- Clade: Pancrustacea
- Class: Insecta
- Order: Diptera
- Family: Campichoetidae
- Genus: Campichoeta; Macquart, 1835

Type species
- Diastata rufipes Meigen, 1830

= Campichoeta =

Genus of flies

Campichoeta are a genus of flies, and are in the family Diastatidae.

== Species ==
- C. fumigata Duda, 1934
- C. grandiloba McAlpine, 1962
- C. griseola (Zetterstedt, 1855)
- C. obscuripennis (Meigen, 1830)
- C. punctum (Meigen, 1830)
- C. zernyi Duda, 1934
