= Camillidae =

Scientific classification
- Kingdom: Animalia
- Phylum: Arthropoda
- Class: Insecta
- Order: Diptera
- Superfamily: Ephydroidea
- Family: Camillidae; Frey, 1921

Genera
- Camilla Haliday in Curtis, 1837; Others...

Family of flies

The Camillidae are a family of flies, or Diptera. The family has five genera (four living; one fossil).

== Description ==
Camilla wing veins

For terms see Morphology of Diptera

Minute (2–3.5 mm or 0.079–0.138 in long), slender, lustrous black flies with hyaline wings. The postvertical bristles on the head are cruciate. There are three small orbital bristles on head on each side of frons, one of which is poorly developed. The vibrissae on the head are well developed. The arista has long rays above and shorter rays below. There are two pairs of dorsocentral bristles on thorax and one mesopleural bristle on the side of the thorax. The costa is interrupted near R1, the subcosta reduced and close to R1, the posterior basal wing cell and discoidal wing cell are fused; anal wing cell rudimentary. Femur of forelegs has a spine on its ventral side.

== Biology ==
The lifestyle of the Camillidae is for the most part little known. There is an assumption that the larvae feed on decaying plant matter or animal faeces. Adults have frequently been found at the entrances of mammal burrows, or captured in mammal nests. Adults may be also found feeding on flowers. One species has been reared from larvae in the dung of rock hyraxes in Southern Africa (Barraclough, 1992).

== Genera ==
- Camilla Haliday in Curtis, 1837
- Afrocamilla Barraclough, 1992
- Katacamilla Papp, 1978
- Teratocamilla Barraclough, 1993
- †Protocamilla Hannig 1965

== Identification ==
- Duda, O. 1934. Camillidae. In Lindner, E. Die Fliegen der Paläarktischen Region, Band VI/1: 1-7, Textfig. 1-8, Stuttgart.
- Papp, L. 1985. A key of the World species of Camillidae (Diptera). Acta zoologica hungarica 31: 217-227.
- A.A. Stackelberg Family Camillidae in Bei-Bienko, G. Ya, 1988 Keys to the insects of the European Part of the USSR Volume 5 (Diptera) Part 2 English edition.

== Phylogeny ==
- Ephydroidea
  - Curtonotidae
  - - Diastatidae+Ephydridae
    - - Drosophilidae
      - Camillidae

McAlpine (1989)

- Ephydroidea
  - Curtonotidae+Drosophilidae
  - - Diastatidae
    - - Ephydridae
      - Camillidae

Grimaldi (1990)
