= Camillina europaea =

Scientific classification
- Domain: Eukaryota
- Kingdom: Animalia
- Phylum: Arthropoda
- Subphylum: Chelicerata
- Class: Arachnida
- Order: Araneae
- Infraorder: Araneomorphae
- Family: Gnaphosidae
- Genus: Camillina
- Species: C. europaea

Binomial name
- Camillina europaea Dalmas, 1922

Species of spider

Camillina europaea is a species of spider in the genus Camillina found in Italy.
