= Camilla (fly) =

Scientific classification
- Kingdom: Animalia
- Phylum: Arthropoda
- Clade: Pancrustacea
- Class: Insecta
- Order: Diptera
- Family: Camillidae
- Genus: Camilla; Haliday in Curtis, 1837

Species
- See text

Synonyms
- Ambacis Enderlein 1922

Genus of flies

Camilla is a genus of flies, from the family Camillidae. Species are small slender, dark flies generally 2–3.5 millimetres (0.1–0.1 in) in length.

== Species ==
- Camilla atrimana
- Camilla flavicauda
- Camilla fuscipes
- Camilla glabra
- Camilla nigrifrons
- Camilla acutipennis
- Camilla africana
- Camilla armata
- Camilla arnaudi
- Camilla atrimana
- Camilla capensis
- Camilla manningi
- Camilla mathisi
- Camilla mongolica
- Camilla orientalis
- Camilla pruinosa
- Camilla sabroskyi
- Camilla seticosta
- Camilla varipes

== Identification ==
- Papp, L. 1985. A key of the World species of Camillidae (Diptera). Acta zoologica hungarica 31: 217–227.
- Collin, J.E. 1933. Five new species of Diptera. Entomologist's monthly Magazine 69: 272–275. (British Species)
