= Echemella =

Scientific classification
- Kingdom: Animalia
- Phylum: Arthropoda
- Subphylum: Chelicerata
- Class: Arachnida
- Order: Araneae
- Infraorder: Araneomorphae
- Family: Gnaphosidae
- Genus: Echemella; Strand, 1906

Type species
- E. quinquedentata Strand, 1906

Species
- 6, see text

Synonyms
- Allodrassus Strand, 1906; Maniana Strand, 1906

Genus of spiders

Echemella is a genus of African ground spiders that was first described by Embrik Strand in 1906.

== Species ==
As of May 2019 it contains six species, mostly from Ethiopia:

- Echemella occulta (Benoit, 1965) – Congo
- Echemella pavesii (Simon, 1909) – Ethiopia
- Echemella quinquedentata Strand, 1906 (type) – Ethiopia
- Echemella sinuosa Murphy & Russell-Smith, 2007 – Ethiopia
- Echemella strandi (Caporiacco, 1940) – Ethiopia
- Echemella tenuis Murphy & Russell-Smith, 2007 – Ethiopia
