= Camillina =

- A juvenile male Camillina cordifera

Scientific classification
- Kingdom: Animalia
- Phylum: Arthropoda
- Subphylum: Chelicerata
- Class: Arachnida
- Order: Araneae
- Infraorder: Araneomorphae
- Family: Gnaphosidae
- Genus: Camillina; Berland, 1919

Type species
- Camillina cordifera (Tullgren, 1910)

Species
- see text

Synonyms
- Camilla Tullgren, 1910, preoccupied; Camillana Strand, 1928, superfluous replacement name

Genus of spiders

Camillina is a genus of ground spiders (family Gnaphosidae) that was first described by Albert Tullgren in 1910 using the unavailable name Camilla. Lucien Berland in 1919 published the replacement name Camillina. They are very similar to the sister genus Zelotes.

They are common ground dwellers often sampled in pitfall traps.

== Taxonomy ==
The genus was erected by Albert Tullgren in 1910 using the name Camilla. However, this had already been used in 1838 for a genus of flies. Accordingly, in 1919 Lucien Berland published the replacement name Camillina. The superfluous replacement name Camillana was published by Embrik Strand in 1928.

== Description ==
Species of genus Camillina can be distinguished from all other gnaphosids by the combined presence of a preening comb on metatarsi III and IV, large and almost touching posterior median eyes, and specific genital features. The male pedipalp has a prolaterally situated, bifid terminal apophysis and medially situated, recessed embolar base, while females have a median epigynal plate.

The body coloration is typically light brown, with the opisthosoma often testaceous. The carapace is longer than wide. The anterior row of eyes, when viewed from the front, is procurved with the lateral eyes larger than the median ones. The posterior row of eyes, when viewed from above, is distinctly procurved with the median eyes larger than the laterals, angular, and contiguous posteriorly.

The sternum is narrower and more oval, measuring 1.25-1.5 times as long as broad and about 1.5 times as broad at the point of greatest width as anteriorly. The abdomen is long and oval. The legs bear preening combs on metatarsi III and IV, consisting of apical combs of long bristles usually on the undersurface.

== Species ==
As of September 2025, this genus includes 77 species:

- Camillina aldabrae (Strand, 1907) – Central, South Africa, Seychelles. Introduced to Malaysia (Borneo)
- Camillina antigua Platnick & Shadab, 1982 – Guatemala, Honduras
- Camillina arequipa Platnick & Shadab, 1982 – Peru
- Camillina balboa Platnick & Shadab, 1982 – Panama, Colombia
- Camillina bimini Platnick & Shadab, 1982 – Bahamas
- Camillina biplagia Tucker, 1923 – South Africa
- Camillina bonaldoi Xavier, Ott & Saturnino, 2020 – Brazil
- Camillina brasiliensis Müller, 1987 – Brazil
- Camillina caldas Platnick & Shadab, 1982 – Brazil
- Camillina calel Platnick & Shadab, 1982 – Argentina
- Camillina campeche Platnick & Shadab, 1982 – Mexico
- Camillina capensis Platnick & Murphy, 1987 – South Africa
- Camillina cauca Platnick & Shadab, 1982 – Colombia
- Camillina cayman Platnick & Shadab, 1982 – Cayman Islands
- Camillina chiapa Platnick & Shadab, 1982 – Mexico
- Camillina chilensis (Simon, 1902) – Brazil, Chile, Juan Fernandez Islands
- Camillina chincha Platnick & Shadab, 1982 – Peru
- Camillina claro Platnick & Shadab, 1982 – Brazil
- Camillina colon Platnick & Shadab, 1982 – Panama
- Camillina cordifera (Tullgren, 1910) – Egypt, Cape Verde, Central, Southern Africa, Seychelles (type species)
- Camillina cordoba Platnick & Murphy, 1987 – Argentina
- Camillina cruz Platnick & Shadab, 1982 – Galapagos
- Camillina cui Platnick & Murphy, 1987 – Paraguay
- Camillina desecheonis (Petrunkevitch, 1930) – Puerto Rico
- Camillina elegans (Bryant, 1940) – Caribbean. Introduced to Angola, Pacific islands
- Camillina europaea Dalmas, 1922 – Italy
- Camillina fiana Platnick & Murphy, 1987 – Madagascar, Comoros
- Camillina gaira Platnick & Shadab, 1982 – Colombia, Caribbean
- Camillina galapagoensis (Banks, 1902) – Galapagos
- Camillina galianoae Platnick & Murphy, 1987 – Argentina
- Camillina huanta Platnick & Shadab, 1982 – Peru
- Camillina isabela Platnick & Murphy, 1987 – Galapagos
- Camillina isla Platnick & Shadab, 1982 – Galapagos
- Camillina javieri Alayón, 2004 – Cuba
- Camillina jeris Platnick & Shadab, 1982 – Curaçao
- Camillina kaibos Platnick & Murphy, 1987 – Ivory Coast, Kenya
- Camillina kochalkai Platnick & Murphy, 1987 – Paraguay
- Camillina kuarup Xavier, Ott & Saturnino, 2020 – Brazil
- Camillina longipes (Nicolet, 1849) – Chile
- Camillina madrejon Platnick & Murphy, 1987 – Paraguay
- Camillina mahnerti Platnick & Murphy, 1987 – Paraguay
- Camillina major (Keyserling, 1891) – Brazil, Argentina
- Camillina marmorata (Mello-Leitão, 1943) – Argentina, Bolivia
- Camillina maun Platnick & Murphy, 1987 – Zambia, Namibia, Botswana, South Africa
- Camillina mauryi Platnick & Murphy, 1987 – Argentina
- Camillina merida Platnick & Shadab, 1982 – Venezuela
- Camillina minuta (Mello-Leitão, 1941) – Argentina
- Camillina mogollon Platnick & Shadab, 1982 – Peru
- Camillina mona Platnick & Shadab, 1982 – Jamaica
- Camillina namibensis Platnick & Murphy, 1987 – Namibia
- Camillina nevada Platnick & Shadab, 1982 – Colombia
- Camillina nevis Platnick & Shadab, 1982 – Caribbean
- Camillina nova Platnick & Shadab, 1982 – Brazil, Paraguay, Argentina
- Camillina oruro Platnick & Shadab, 1982 – Bolivia, Peru, Argentina
- Camillina pavesii (Simon, 1897) – South Saharan Africa
- Camillina pecki Baert, 1994 – Galapagos
- Camillina pedestris (O. Pickard-Cambridge, 1898) – Mexico
- Camillina penai Platnick & Murphy, 1987 – Chile, Peru
- Camillina pernambuco Müller, 1987 – Brazil
- Camillina pilar Platnick & Murphy, 1987 – Paraguay, Argentina
- Camillina piura Platnick & Shadab, 1982 – Peru
- Camillina procurva (Purcell, 1908) – Namibia, South Africa
- Camillina puebla Platnick & Shadab, 1982 – Mexico, Honduras
- Camillina pulchra (Keyserling, 1891) – Brazil, Argentina. Introduced to United States
- Camillina punta Platnick & Shadab, 1982 – Peru
- Camillina recife Müller, 1987 – Brazil
- Camillina relucens (Simon, 1893) – Venezuela
- Camillina rogeri Alayón, 1993 – Cuba
- Camillina samariensis Müller, 1988 – Colombia
- Camillina sandrae Baert, 1994 – Galapagos
- Camillina setosa Tucker, 1923 – South Africa
- Camillina shaba FitzPatrick, 2005 – DR Congo
- Camillina suya Xavier, Ott & Saturnino, 2020 – Brazil
- Camillina tarapaca Platnick & Shadab, 1982 – Chile
- Camillina taruma Platnick & Höfer, 1990 – Brazil
- Camillina tsima Platnick & Murphy, 1987 – Madagascar
- Camillina ventana Ferreira, Zambonato & Lise, 2004 – Argentina
