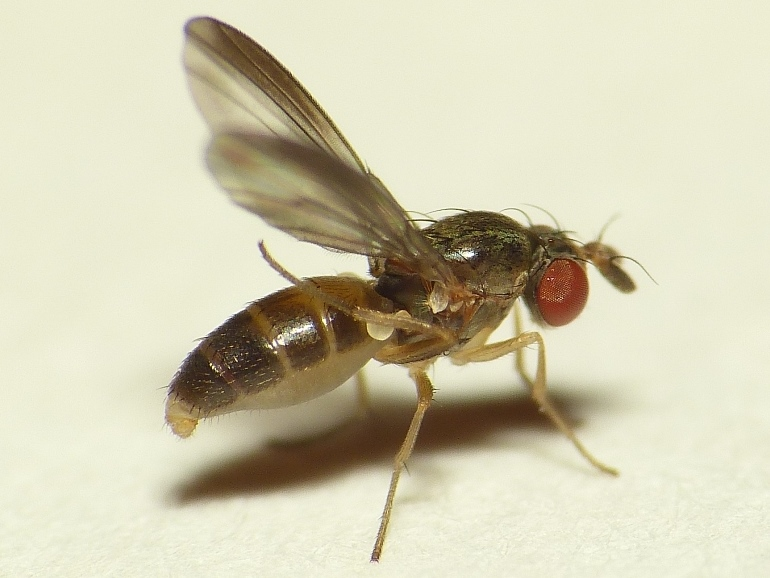
- Campichoeta obscuripennis

Scientific classification
- Kingdom: Animalia
- Phylum: Arthropoda
- Class: Insecta
- Order: Diptera
- Superfamily: Ephydroidea
- Family: Campichoetidae

= Campichoetidae =

Family of flies

Campichoetidae is a small family of acalyptrate Diptera with only one genus Campichoeta Macquart, 1835. They are regarded by most authors as Diastatidae as subfamily Campichoetinae.
