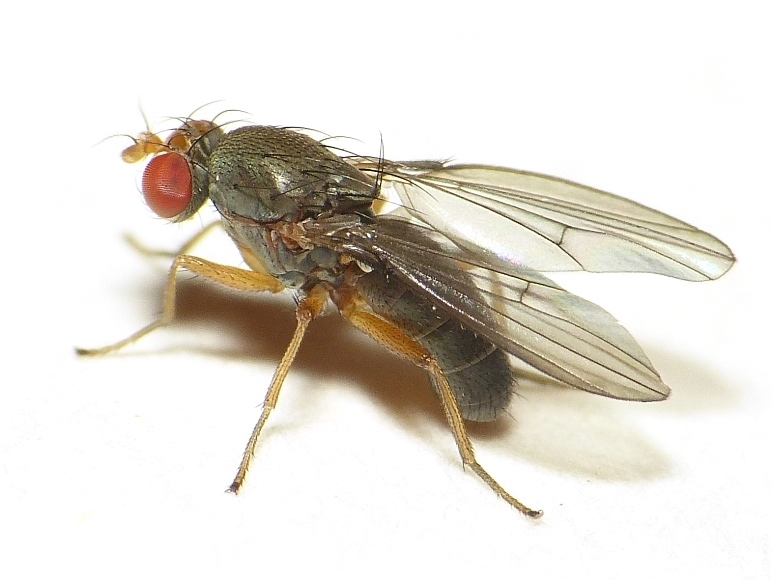
- Diastata fuscula
- Diastatidae wing veins

Scientific classification
- Domain: Eukaryota
- Kingdom: Animalia
- Phylum: Arthropoda
- Class: Insecta
- Order: Diptera
- Superfamily: Ephydroidea
- Family: Diastatidae; Hendel, 1917)

Type genus
- Diastata Meigen, 1830

Subfamilies
- Diastatinae; Campichoetinae

= Diastatidae =

Family of flies

Diastata costata filmed in a forest near Marburg, Hesse; Germany.

Diastatidae are a family of flies in the order Diptera. They are encountered primarily in the Holarctic Region, but several species are found in the Oriental, Neotropical and Australasian regions. Members of the family number over 20 described species in three genera. There is an additional fossil genus.

== Description ==
For terms see Morphology of Diptera

Minute flies with grey or brown-grey body and, usually, maculate wings. The postvertical bristles on head are cruciate and vibrissae are present on the head are present. The front orbital bristles are inset and upswept. The costa is interrupted near the end of Radial vein 1 and sometimes also near the humeral crossvein. The subcosta is incomplete fusing with Radial vein 1 before the apex. The posterior basal wing cell and discoidal wing cell are separate. The anal cell of wing and the anal vein of wing are both present.

== Biology ==
Adults of living forms have been found along margins of bogs, marshes, and the edges of moist woodlands. Immature biologies are largely unknown. Hennig wrote about it thought to be Campichoeta punctum.

== Genera ==
- Diastatinae
  - Diastata Meigen, 1830
- Campichoetinae
  - Campichoeta Macquart, 1835 (sometimes treated as a separate family Campichoetidae)
  - Euthychaeta Loew, 1864
  - †Pareuthychaeta Hennig 1965

== Identification ==
- Duda, O. (1934), Ephydridae. 6, 1, 58e, 1–18.In: Lindner, E. (Ed.). Die Fliegen der Paläarktischen Region 6: 1–115. Keys to Palaearctic species but now needs revision (in German).
- A.A. Shtakel 'berg Family Diastatidae in Bei-Bienko, G. Ya, 1988 Keys to the insects of the European Part of the USSR Volume 5 (Diptera) Part 2 English edition. Keys to Palaearctic species but now needs revision .

== Phylogeny ==
- Ephydroidea
  - Curtonotidae
  - - Drosophilidae+Camillidae
    - - Ephydridae
      - Diastatidae sensu lato

McAlpine (1989)

- Ephydroidea
  - - Curtonotidae+Drosophilidae
  - - Campichoetidae
    - - Ephydridae+Camillidae
      - Diastatidae

Grimaldi (1990)

== Other ==
Diastatidae were once considered by some to be Ephydridae.
