= Zelotes otavi =

Otavi's Dark Ground Spider

Conservation status
- Least Concern (SANBI Red List)

Scientific classification
- Kingdom: Animalia
- Phylum: Arthropoda
- Subphylum: Chelicerata
- Class: Arachnida
- Order: Araneae
- Infraorder: Araneomorphae
- Family: Gnaphosidae
- Genus: Zelotes
- Species: Z. otavi

Binomial name
- Zelotes otavi FitzPatrick, 2007

Synonyms
- Setaphis lightfooti Tucker, 1923 (preoccupied)

Species of spider

Zelotes otavi is a species of spider in the family Gnaphosidae. It is commonly known as Otavi's dark ground spider and is endemic to southern Africa.

== Distribution ==
Zelotes otavi occurs in Namibia, Botswana, and South Africa. In South Africa, the species is known only from Limpopo province, where it has been recorded from locations including the Springbok Flats area, Goro Game Ranch, Western Soutpansberg, Lhuvhondo Nature Reserve, and Nwanedi Nature Reserve.

== Habitat and ecology ==
The species inhabits the Savanna biome at altitudes ranging from 973 to 1,523 m above sea level. Like other members of its genus, Zelotes otavi are free-running ground spiders that are found under stones during the day.

== Conservation ==
Zelotes otavi is listed as Least Concern by the South African National Biodiversity Institute due to its wide range across southern Africa. In South Africa, the species receives protection in Lhuvhondo Nature Reserve. There are no significant threats identified for this species.

== Taxonomy ==
The species was originally described by Tucker in 1923 as Setaphis lightfooti, but this name was preoccupied by another species described by Purcell in 1907. FitzPatrick provided the replacement name Zelotes otavi in 2007 and transferred the species from the genus Setaphis to Zelotes.
