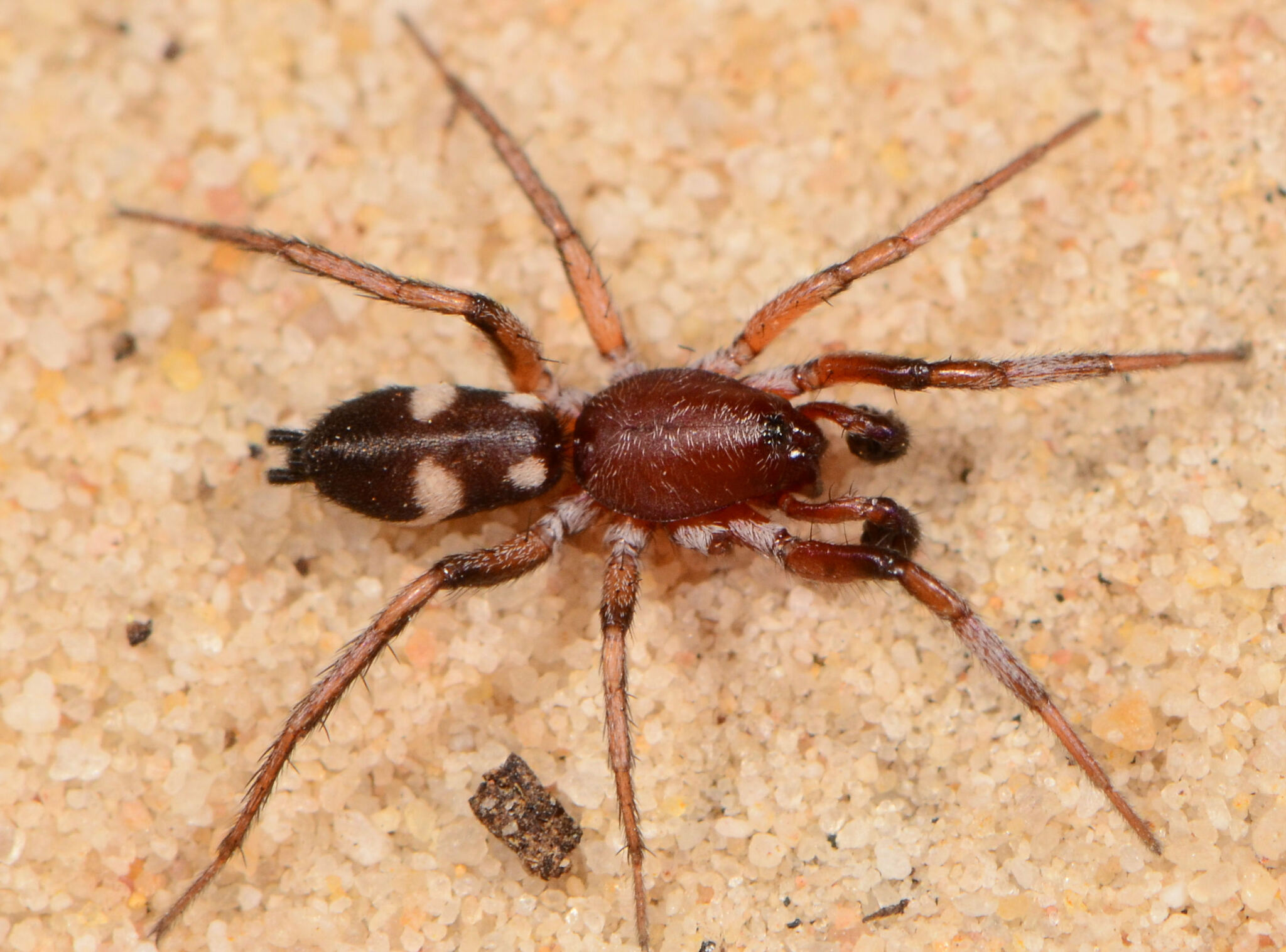
- male from South Africa
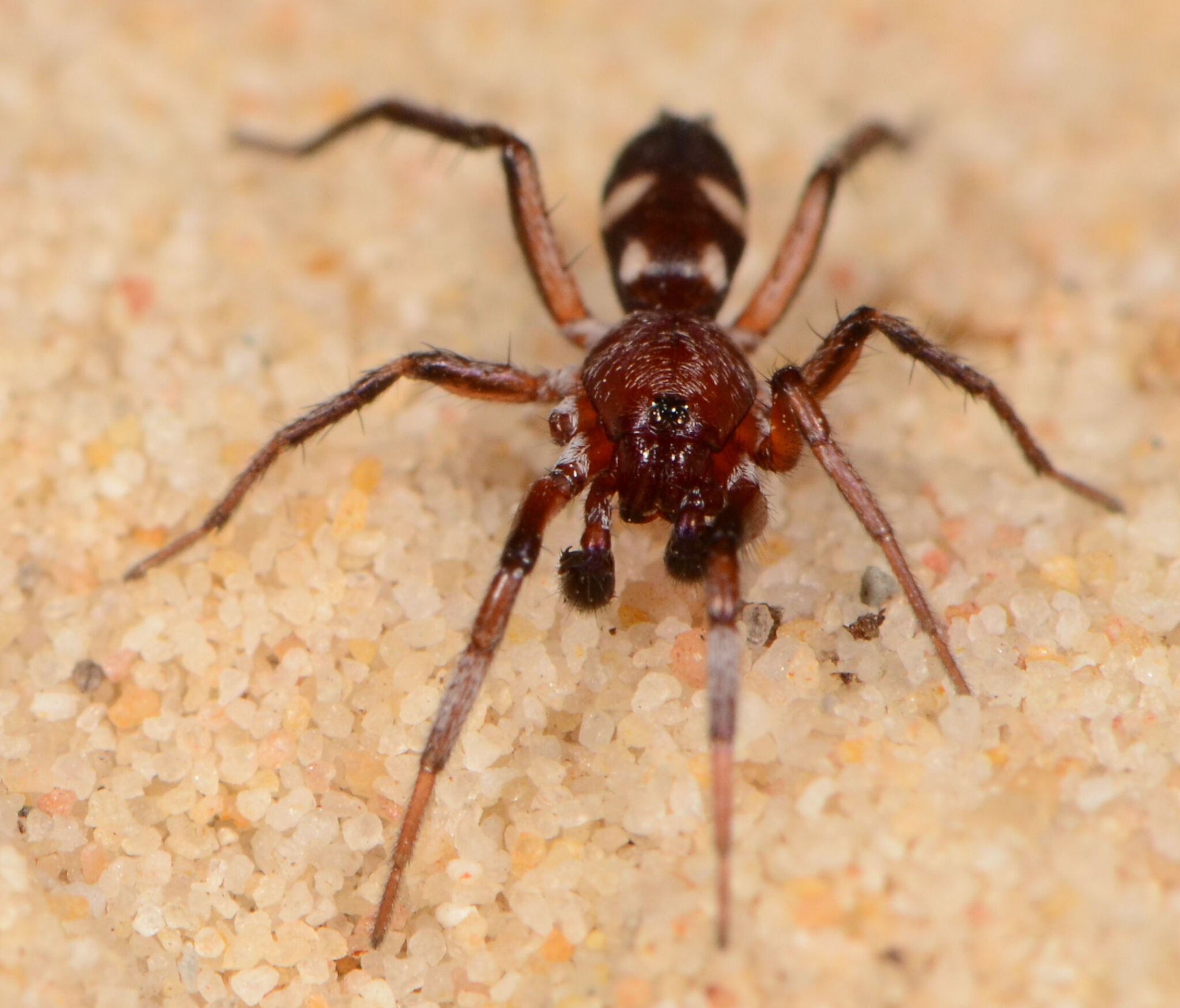

Conservation status
- Least Concern (SANBI Red List)

Scientific classification
- Kingdom: Animalia
- Phylum: Arthropoda
- Subphylum: Chelicerata
- Class: Arachnida
- Order: Araneae
- Infraorder: Araneomorphae
- Family: Gnaphosidae
- Genus: Ibala
- Species: I. bilinearis

Binomial name
- Ibala bilinearis (Tucker, 1923)

= Ibala bilinearis =

Spotted Ibala Flat-bellied Ground Spider

Species of spider

Ibala bilinearis is a species of spider in the family Gnaphosidae. It is a southern African endemic species commonly known as the spotted Ibala flat-bellied ground spider.

== Distribution ==
Ibala bilinearis is distributed across Botswana, Mozambique, and South Africa. In South Africa, it is recorded from five provinces, Eastern Cape, Limpopo, Mpumalanga, Northern Cape, and Western Cape, at altitudes ranging from 241 to 1,523 m above sea level.

== Habitat and ecology ==
The species is a free-living ground dweller sampled from Nama Karoo, Savanna, and Thicket biomes as well as in agro-ecosystems including cotton fields and pistachio orchards.

== Conservation ==
Ibala bilinearis is listed as Least Concern by the South African National Biodiversity Institute due to its wide range. It is protected in more than 10 protected areas.

== Taxonomy ==
The species was originally described by Tucker in 1923 from Hanover in the Northern Cape as Setaphis bilinearis. It was revised by Fitzpatrick (2009).
