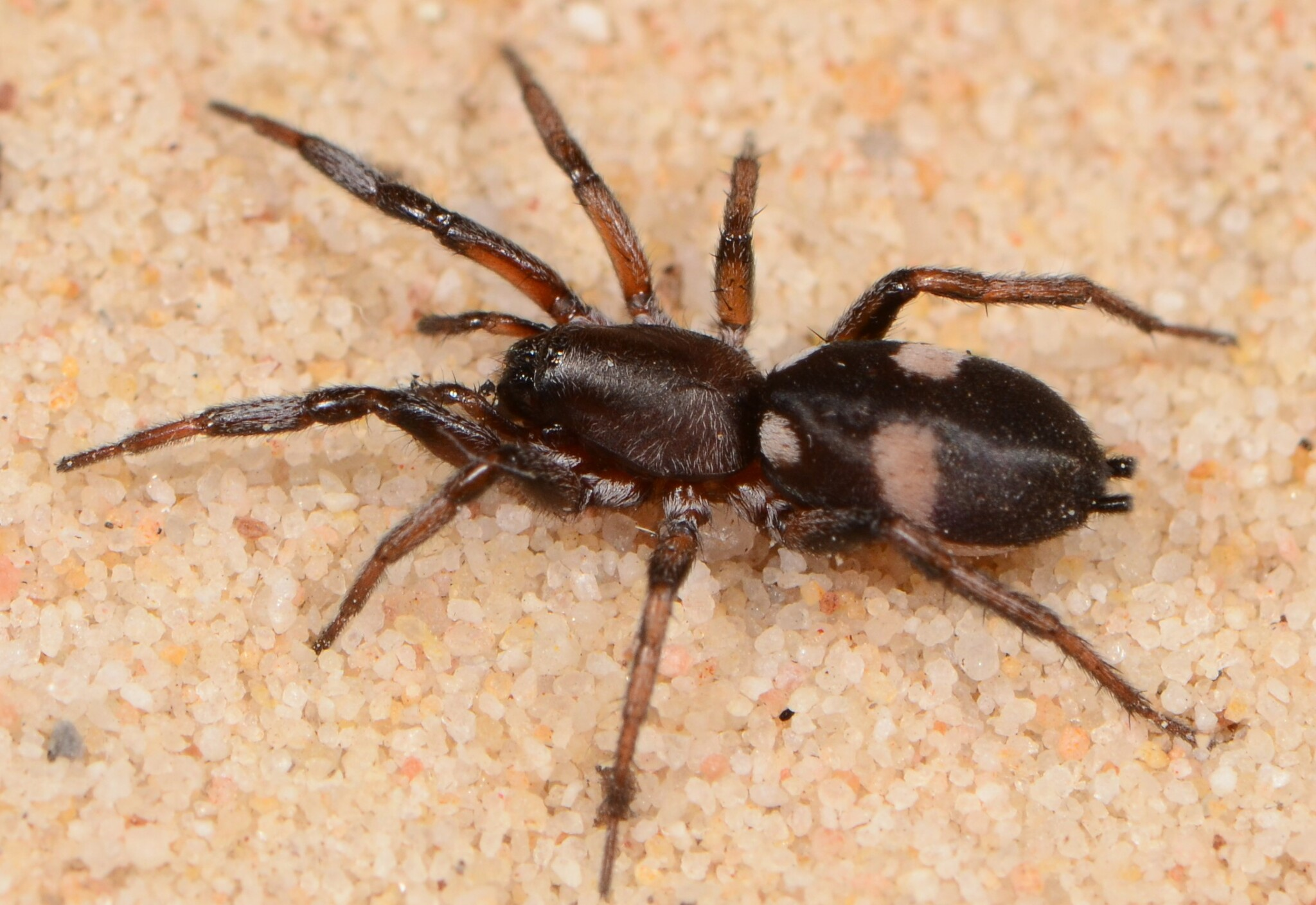
- female Ibala arcus
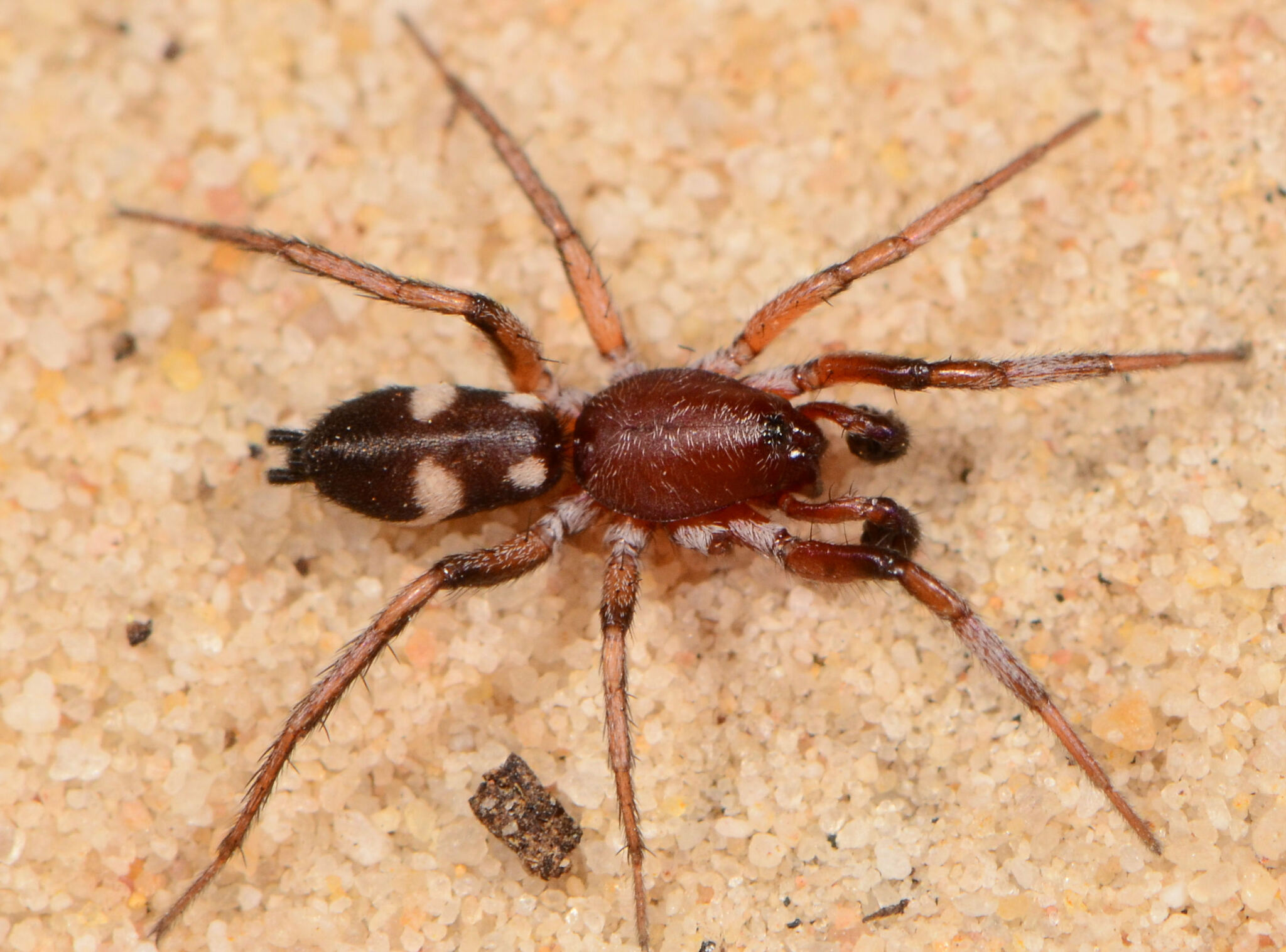
- male Ibala bilinearis

Scientific classification
- Kingdom: Animalia
- Phylum: Arthropoda
- Subphylum: Chelicerata
- Class: Arachnida
- Order: Araneae
- Infraorder: Araneomorphae
- Family: Gnaphosidae
- Genus: Ibala; Fitzpatrick, 2009

Type species
- I. arcus (Tucker, 1923)

Species
- 17, see text

= Ibala =

Genus of spiders

Ibala is a genus of African ground spiders that was first described by M. J. FitzPatrick in 2009.

== Description ==
Spiders of the genus Ibala are small with average total length of 4-6 mm. The carapace and legs are reddish brown, while the abdomen is black with four white spots dorsally joined to form two longitudinal white strips or two white longitudinal white stripes ventrally. The carapace is longer than wide, with anterior lateral eyes largest and posterior medial eyes oval in shape. The anterior row is slightly recurved and the posterior row straight. The carapace is covered in fine hairs and the fovea is short.

The chelicerae have four teeth on the outer row and one or none on the inner row. The labium is not fused to the sternum.

The abdomen is covered in fine hairs, with some strong curved hairs antero-dorsally. The leg formulae is IV, I, II, III. A preening comb is present on metatarsi III and IV. Several long, curved trichobothria are present on tibiae, metatarsi and tarsi I-IV.

The palpal tibia has a single curved apophysis and patches of hairs. The male palp has a prominent curved median apophysis and the embolus is long and thin. The epigynum has a central opening, with ducts variable but usually curved.

== Taxonomy ==
The status of most of the southern African species of the genus Setaphis had remained uncertain since the generic revision by Platnick and Murphy (1966). The southern African gnaphosids formerly placed in Setaphis formed a monophyletic group recognized by their colour pattern consisting of white markings on a black abdomen. Fitzpatrick (2009) created the genus Ibala to accommodate them.

== Species ==
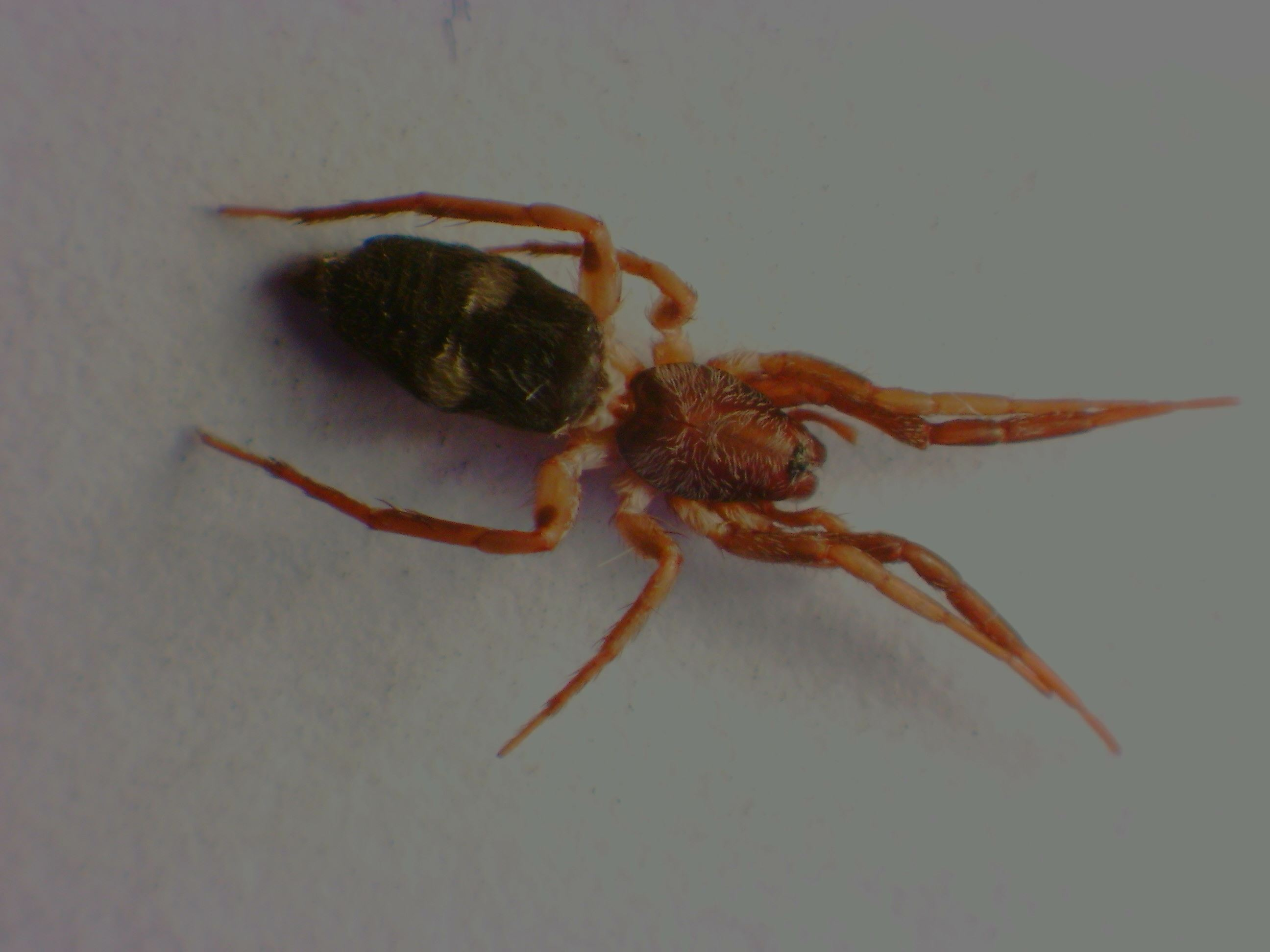
Female I. minshullae in Shangani, Zimbabwe

As of September 2025, this genus includes 17 species:

- Ibala arcus (Tucker, 1923) – Namibia, Zimbabwe, South Africa (type species)
- Ibala bilinearis (Tucker, 1923) – Botswana, Mozambique, South Africa
- Ibala bulawayensis (Tucker, 1923) – Zimbabwe, South Africa
- Ibala declani Fitzpatrick, 2009 – Zimbabwe
- Ibala gonono Fitzpatrick, 2009 – Zimbabwe
- Ibala hessei (Lawrence, 1928) – Namibia
- Ibala isikela Fitzpatrick, 2009 – Zambia, Zimbabwe
- Ibala kaokoensis (Lawrence, 1928) – Namibia
- Ibala kevini Fitzpatrick, 2009 – Zimbabwe
- Ibala kylae Fitzpatrick, 2009 – Zimbabwe
- Ibala lapidaria (Lawrence, 1928) – Namibia, South Africa
- Ibala mabalauta Fitzpatrick, 2009 – Zimbabwe
- Ibala minshullae Fitzpatrick, 2009 – Zimbabwe
- Ibala okorosave Fitzpatrick, 2009 – Namibia, South Africa
- Ibala omuramba (Lawrence, 1927) – Namibia
- Ibala quadrativulva (Lawrence, 1927) – Namibia
- Ibala robinsoni Fitzpatrick, 2009 – Zimbabwe, Botswana
