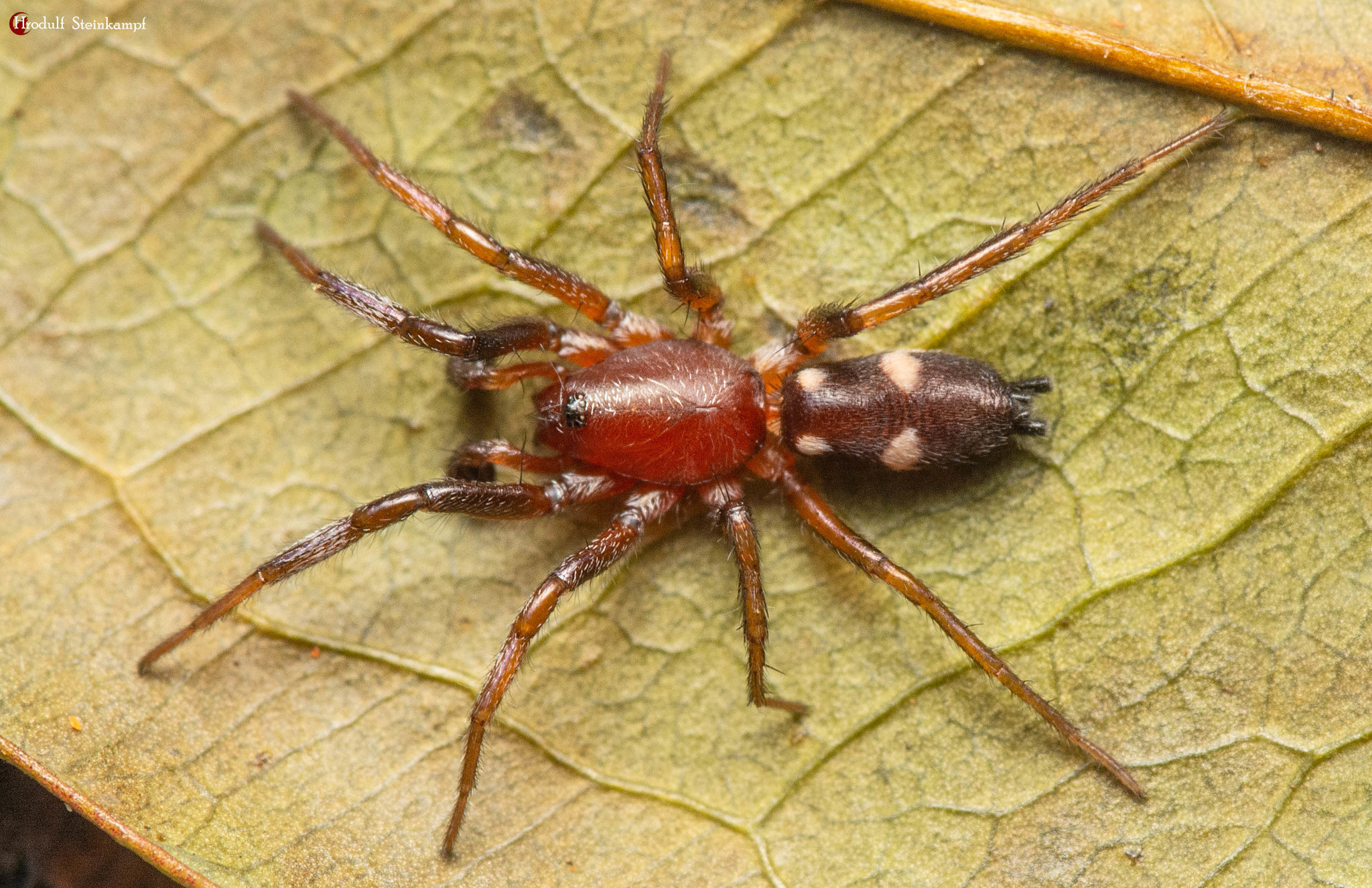
- male
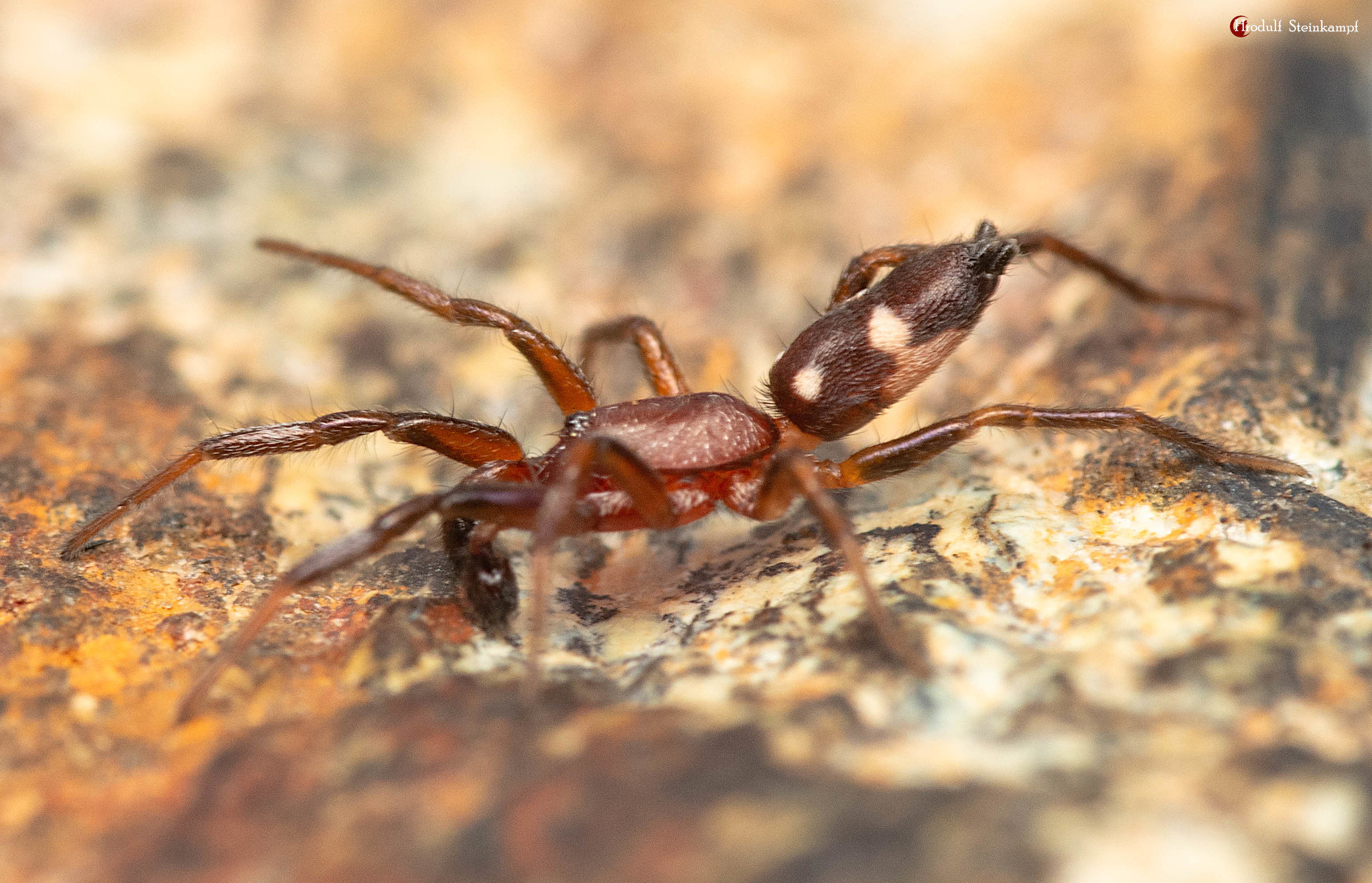
- male

Scientific classification
- Kingdom: Animalia
- Phylum: Arthropoda
- Subphylum: Chelicerata
- Class: Arachnida
- Order: Araneae
- Infraorder: Araneomorphae
- Family: Gnaphosidae
- Genus: Ibala
- Species: I. bulawayensis

Binomial name
- Ibala bulawayensis (Tucker, 1923)

= Ibala bulawayensis =

Zimbabwean Spotted Ibala Flat-bellied Ground Spider

Species of spider

Ibala bulawayensis is a species of spider in the family Gnaphosidae. It is a southern African endemic species commonly known as the Zimbabwean spotted Ibala flat-bellied ground spider.

== Distribution ==
Ibala bulawayensis is distributed across Zimbabwe and South Africa. In South Africa, it is recorded from the two provinces Limpopo and Northern Cape.

== Habitat and ecology ==
The species is a free-living ground dweller sampled from the Savanna biome, at altitudes ranging from 1,190 to 1,341 m above sea level.

== Description ==
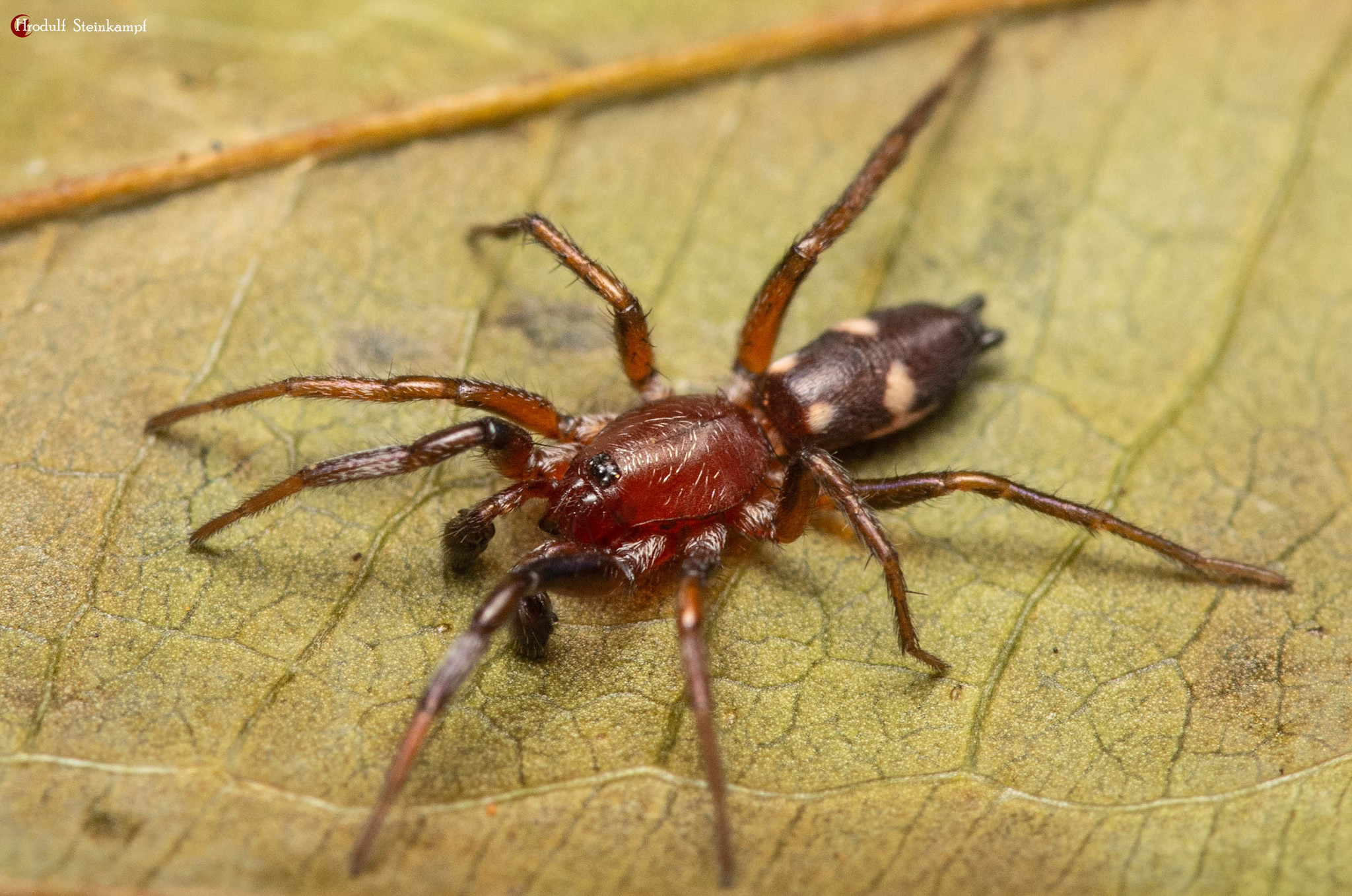
male

== Conservation ==
Ibala bulawayensis is listed as Least Concern by the South African National Biodiversity Institute due to its wide geographic range in southern Africa. It is protected in Benfontein Game Reserve and Lhuvhondo Nature Reserve.

== Taxonomy ==
The species was originally described by Tucker in 1923 from Zimbabwe as Setaphis bulawayensis. It was revised by Fitzpatrick (2009).
