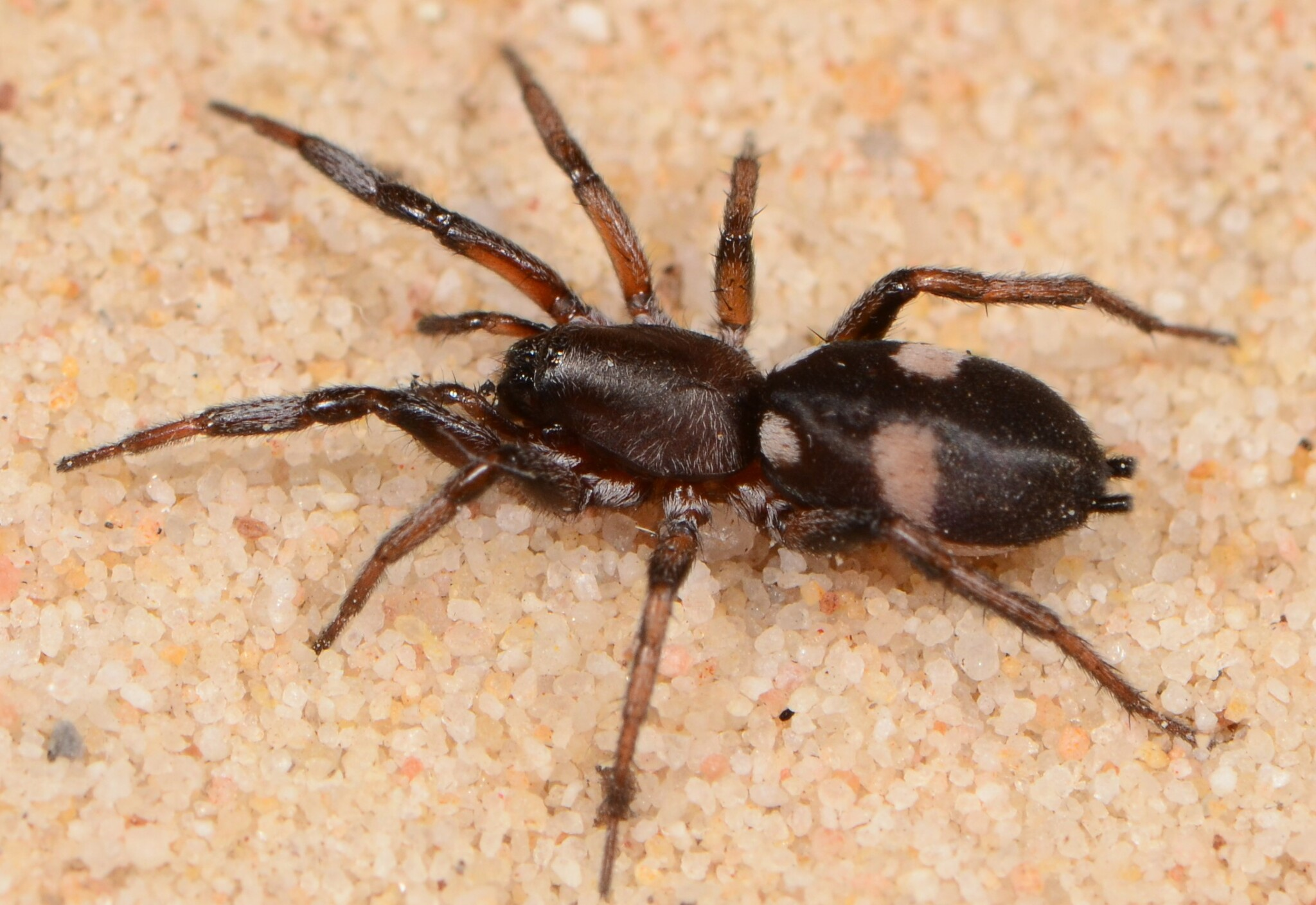
- female
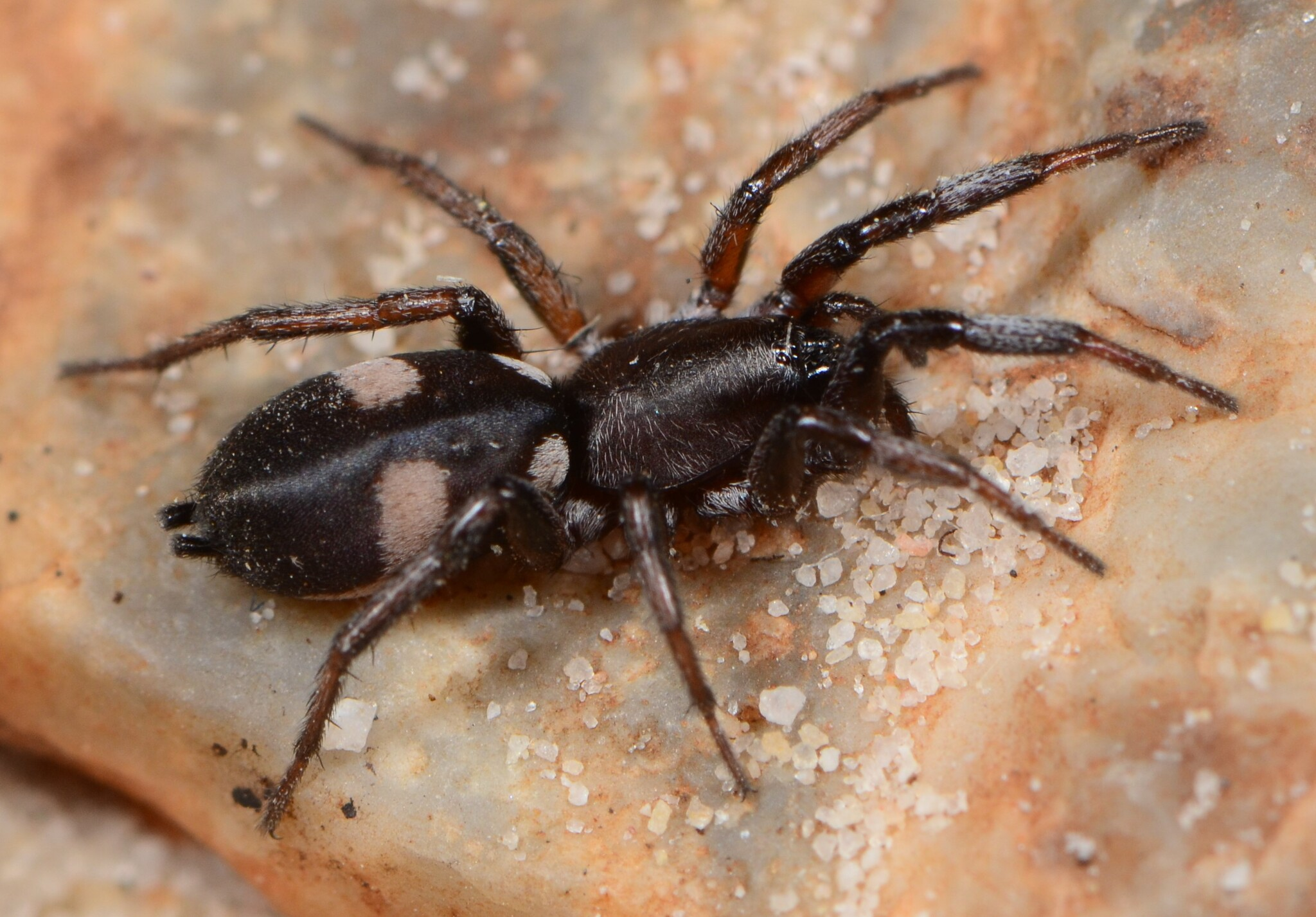
- female

Scientific classification
- Kingdom: Animalia
- Phylum: Arthropoda
- Subphylum: Chelicerata
- Class: Arachnida
- Order: Araneae
- Infraorder: Araneomorphae
- Family: Gnaphosidae
- Genus: Ibala
- Species: I. arcus

Binomial name
- Ibala arcus (Tucker, 1923)

Synonyms
- Setaphis calviniensis Tucker, 1923

= Ibala arcus =

Species of spider

Ibala arcus is a species of spider in the family Gnaphosidae. It is a southern African endemic species.

== Distribution ==
Ibala arcus is distributed across Zimbabwe, Namibia, and South Africa. In South Africa, it is recorded from all provinces at altitudes ranging from 47 to 1,645 m above sea level.

== Habitat and ecology ==
The species is a free-living ground dweller, sampled from the Grassland, Nama Karoo, Savanna, and Succulent Karoo biomes. It has also been sampled from maize fields.

The species mimics velvet ants (Hymenoptera: Mutillidae) with whom they are often caught in pitfall traps.

== Description ==
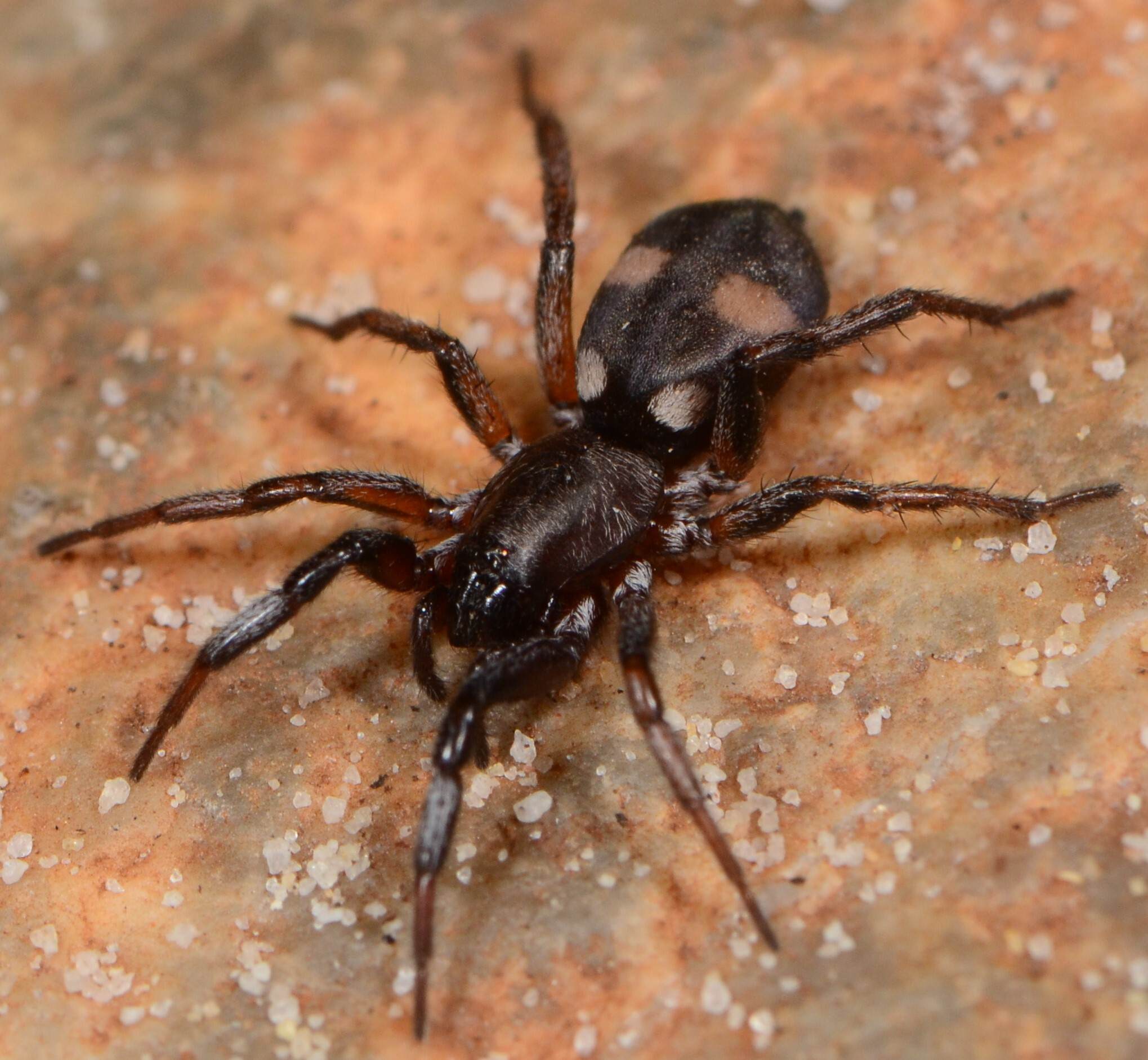
female

Ibala arcus is known from both sexes. It is a small spider with average total length of 4-6 mm. The carapace and legs are reddish brown, while the abdomen is black with four white spots dorsally joined to form two longitudinal white strips.

== Conservation ==
Ibala arcus is listed as Least Concern by the South African National Biodiversity Institute due to its wide distribution range. The species is found in more than 10 protected areas.

== Taxonomy ==
The species was originally described by Tucker in 1923 from Warmbaths in Limpopo as Setaphis arcus. It was revised by Fitzpatrick (2009).
