= Ibala okorosave =

Okorosave Ibala Flat-bellied Ground Spider

Conservation status
- Least Concern (SANBI Red List)

Scientific classification
- Kingdom: Animalia
- Phylum: Arthropoda
- Subphylum: Chelicerata
- Class: Arachnida
- Order: Araneae
- Infraorder: Araneomorphae
- Family: Gnaphosidae
- Genus: Ibala
- Species: I. okorosave

Binomial name
- Ibala okorosave FitzPatrick, 2009

Species of spider

Ibala okorosave is a species of spider in the family Gnaphosidae. It is a southern African endemic species commonly known as the Okorosave Ibala flat-bellied ground spider.

== Distribution ==
Ibala okorosave is distributed across Namibia and South Africa. In South Africa, it is recorded from the Northern Cape at altitudes ranging from 1,011 to 1,155 m above sea level.

== Habitat and ecology ==
The species is a free-living ground dweller sampled from the Savanna biome.

== Description ==
Ibala okorosave is known only from the female. The carapace is brown, the apex of femur, patella, and tibia of the first leg are infuscated, and the remaining segments are yellowish brown. Legs II, III and IV are more or less infuscated at the sides.

The abdomen has a pair of white markings above forming a large white patch on each side ventrally, with a median broad band much broader anteriorly than posteriorly ventrally.

== Conservation ==
Ibala okorosave is listed as Least Concern by the South African National Biodiversity Institute due to its wide range in southern Africa. It is protected in Tswalu Kalahari Reserve and Rooipoort Nature Reserve.

== Taxonomy ==
The species was originally described by FitzPatrick in 2009 from Namibia.
