= Setaphis sexmaculata =

Scientific classification
- Kingdom: Animalia
- Phylum: Arthropoda
- Subphylum: Chelicerata
- Class: Arachnida
- Order: Araneae
- Infraorder: Araneomorphae
- Family: Gnaphosidae
- Genus: Setaphis
- Species: S. sexmaculata

Binomial name
- Setaphis sexmaculata Simon, 1893

Species of spider

Setaphis sexmaculata is a species of spider in the family Gnaphosidae. It is endemic to South Africa.

== Distribution ==
Setaphis sexmaculata is found in two South African provinces: Northern Cape and North West. It is known from Kimberley and Vryburg.

== Habitat and ecology ==
The species is a free-running ground dweller found at altitudes ranging from 1,205 to 1,218 m above sea level. It has been sampled from the Savanna biome.

== Conservation ==
Setaphis sexmaculata is listed as Data Deficient for taxonomic reasons by the South African National Biodiversity Institute as too little is known about the location, habitat and threats of this taxon for an assessment to be made. Both samples were collected prior to 1893, and the placement of the species is problematic.

== Etymology ==
The species name sexmaculata means "six-spotted" in Latin.

== Taxonomy ==
The species was described by Eugène Simon in 1893 from Kimberley. According to FitzPatrick (2009), the type material could not be traced at the Museum National d'histoire Naturelle in Paris, and the status of this species remains unclear, although the general description fits that of Ibala.
