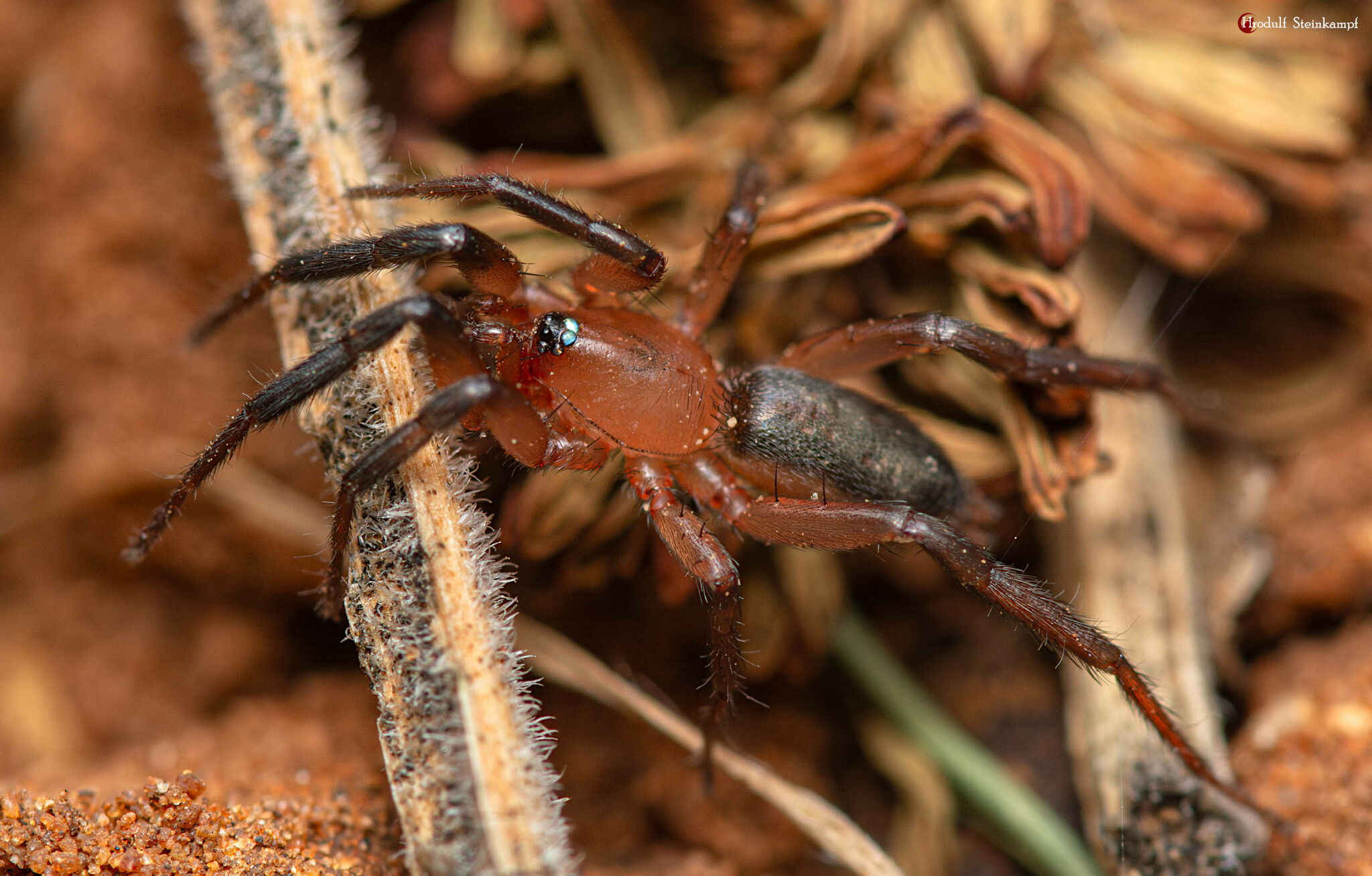

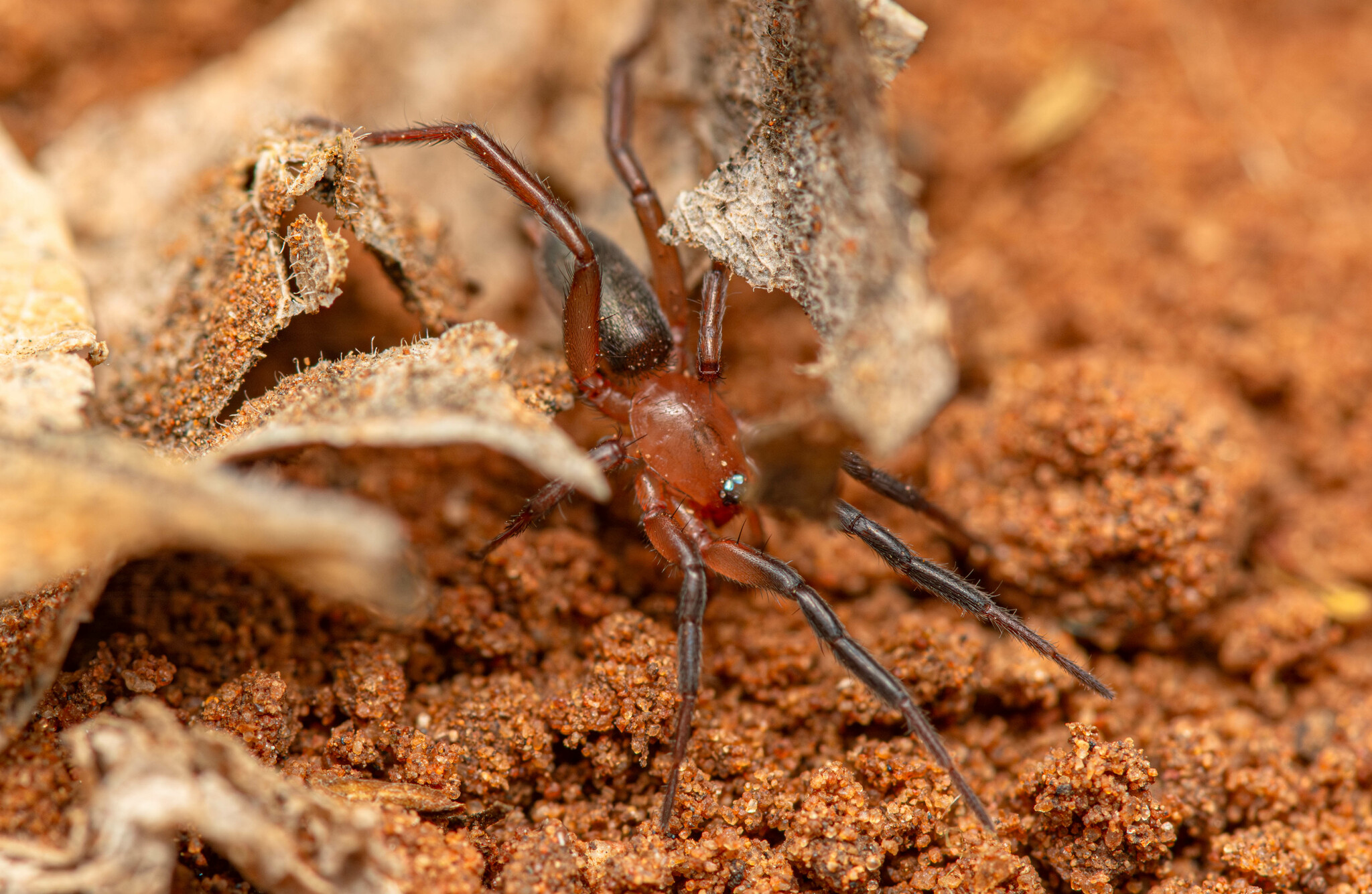

Scientific classification
- Kingdom: Animalia
- Phylum: Arthropoda
- Subphylum: Chelicerata
- Class: Arachnida
- Order: Araneae
- Infraorder: Araneomorphae
- Family: Gnaphosidae
- Genus: Setaphis
- Species: S. browni

Binomial name
- Setaphis browni (Tucker, 1923)

Synonyms
- Camillina browni Tucker, 1923; Liodrassus mandae Tikader & Gajbe, 1977; Nodocion mandae Brignoli, 1983

= Setaphis browni =

Species of spider

Setaphis browni is a species of spider in the family Gnaphosidae. It has a very wide distribution throughout Africa to northern Pakistan and India.

== Distribution ==
Setaphis browni is found from southern and central Africa to northern Pakistan and India.

In South Africa, it is widespread through seven provinces, Free State, KwaZulu-Natal, Limpopo, Northern Cape, North West, Mpumalanga, and Western Cape. Notable locations include Fauresmith, National Botanical Gardens in Bloemfontein, Ndumo Game Reserve, Kruger National Park, and Swartberg Nature Reserve.

== Habitat and ecology ==
The species is a free-running ground dweller found at altitudes ranging from 62 to 1,516 m above sea level. It has been sampled from Grassland, Nama Karoo, Savanna, and Thicket biomes, as well as from cotton and pistachio orchards.

== Description ==
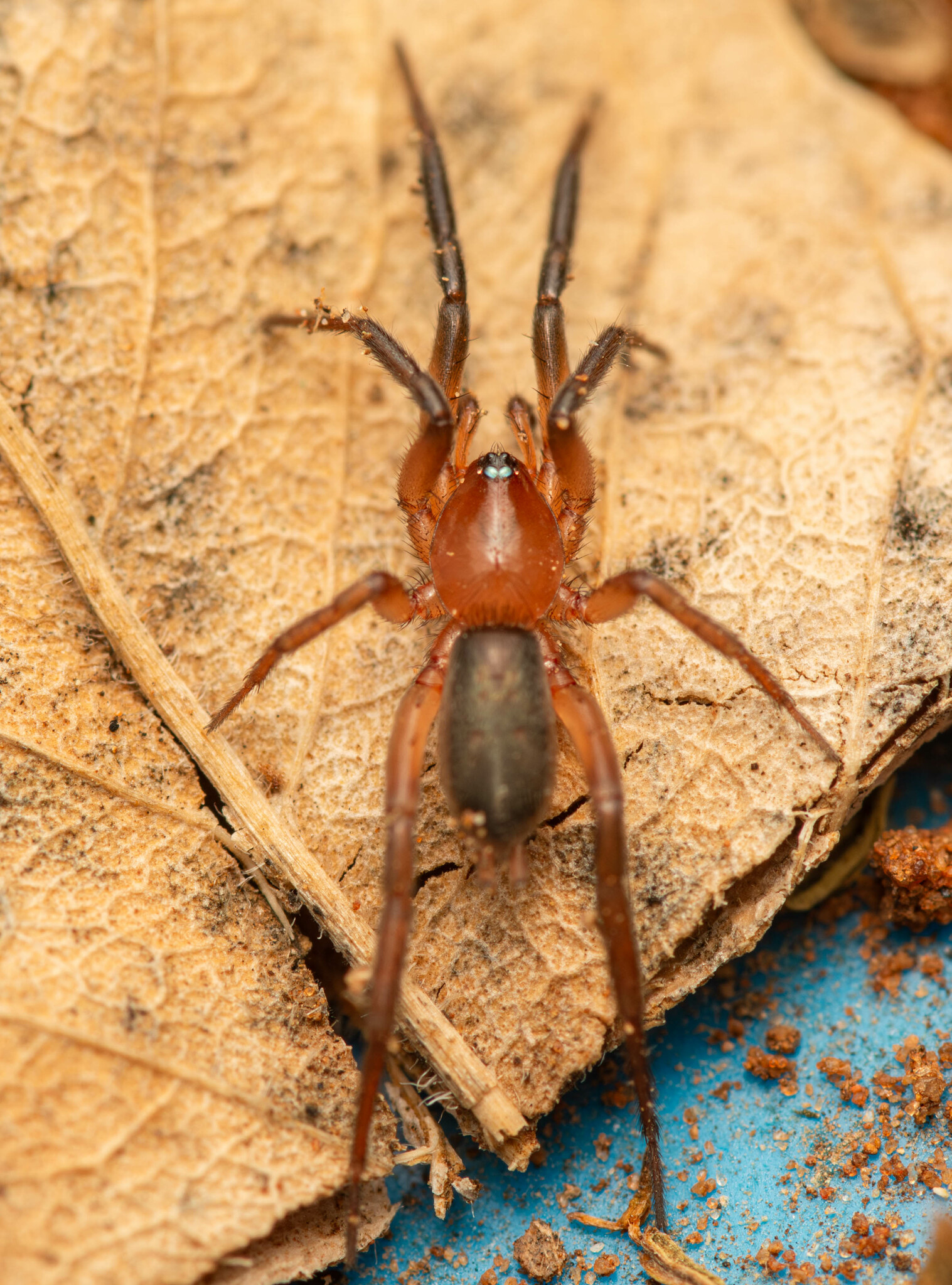

== Conservation ==
Setaphis browni is listed as Least Concern by the South African National Biodiversity Institute due to its wide range. The species is protected in more than ten protected areas and faces no significant threats.

== Taxonomy ==
Setaphis browni was originally described by Tucker in 1923 as Camillina browni from Vryburg in South Africa. It has undergone several taxonomic changes and is known from both sexes.
