= Ibala lapidaria =

Spotted Ibala Flat Bellied Ground Spider

Conservation status
- Least Concern (SANBI Red List)

Scientific classification
- Kingdom: Animalia
- Phylum: Arthropoda
- Subphylum: Chelicerata
- Class: Arachnida
- Order: Araneae
- Infraorder: Araneomorphae
- Family: Gnaphosidae
- Genus: Ibala
- Species: I. lapidaria

Binomial name
- Ibala lapidaria (Lawrence, 1928)

Species of spider

Ibala lapidaria is a species of spider in the family Gnaphosidae. It is a southern African endemic species commonly known as the spotted ibala flat bellied ground spider.

== Distribution ==
Ibala lapidaria is distributed across Namibia and South Africa. In South Africa, it is recorded from two provinces: Gauteng and Limpopo, at altitudes ranging from 464 to 1,471 m above sea level.

== Habitat and ecology ==
The species is a free-living ground dweller recorded from the Grassland and Savanna biomes.

== Conservation ==
Ibala lapidaria is listed as Least Concern by the South African National Biodiversity Institute due to its wide distribution range. It is protected in three reserves, Suikerbosrand Nature Reserve, Maremani Game Reserve and Nwanedi Game Reserve.

== Taxonomy ==
The species was originally described by R. F. Lawrence in 1928 from Namibia as Setaphis lapidaria. It was revised by Fitzpatrick (2009).
