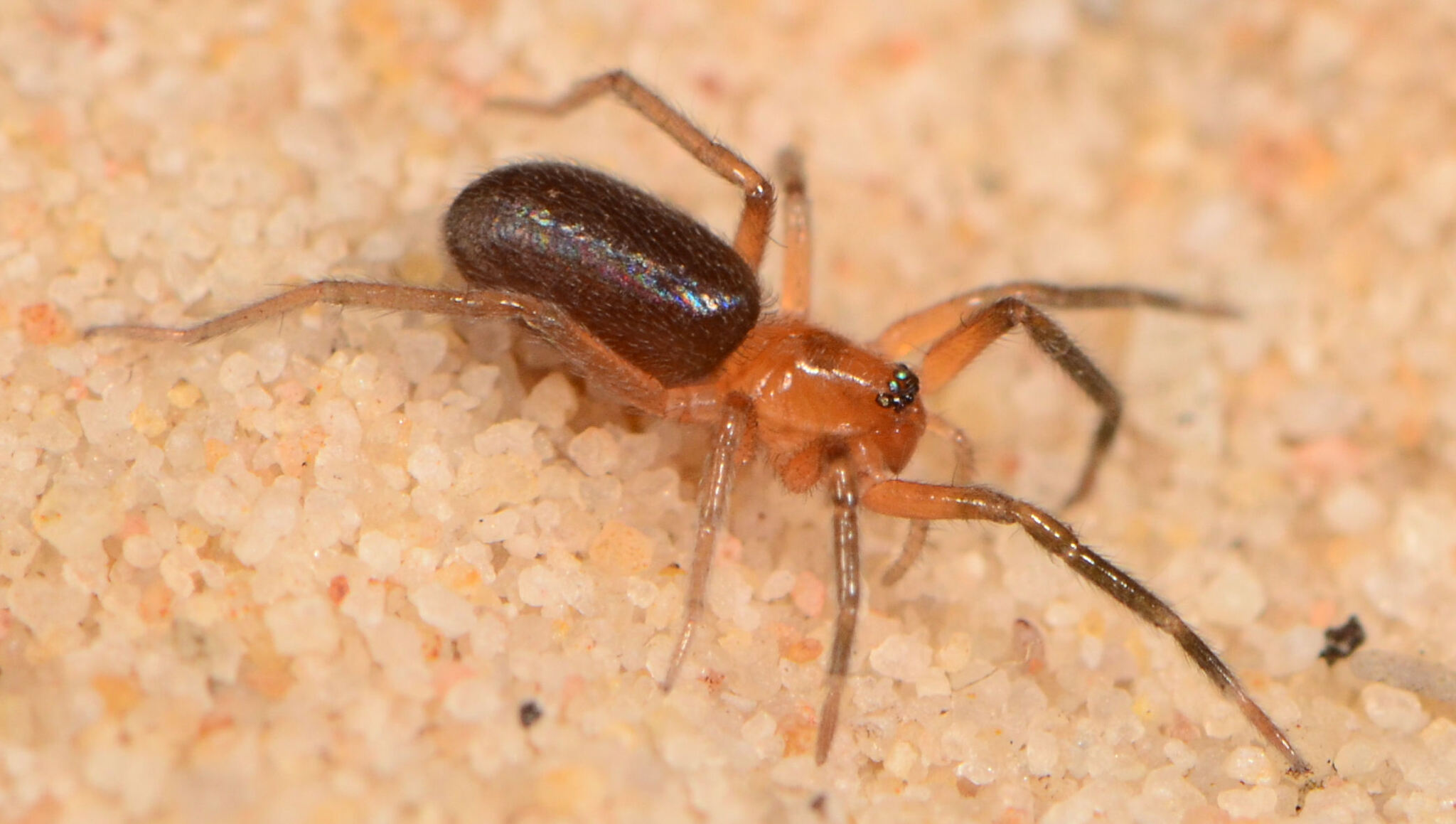
- male
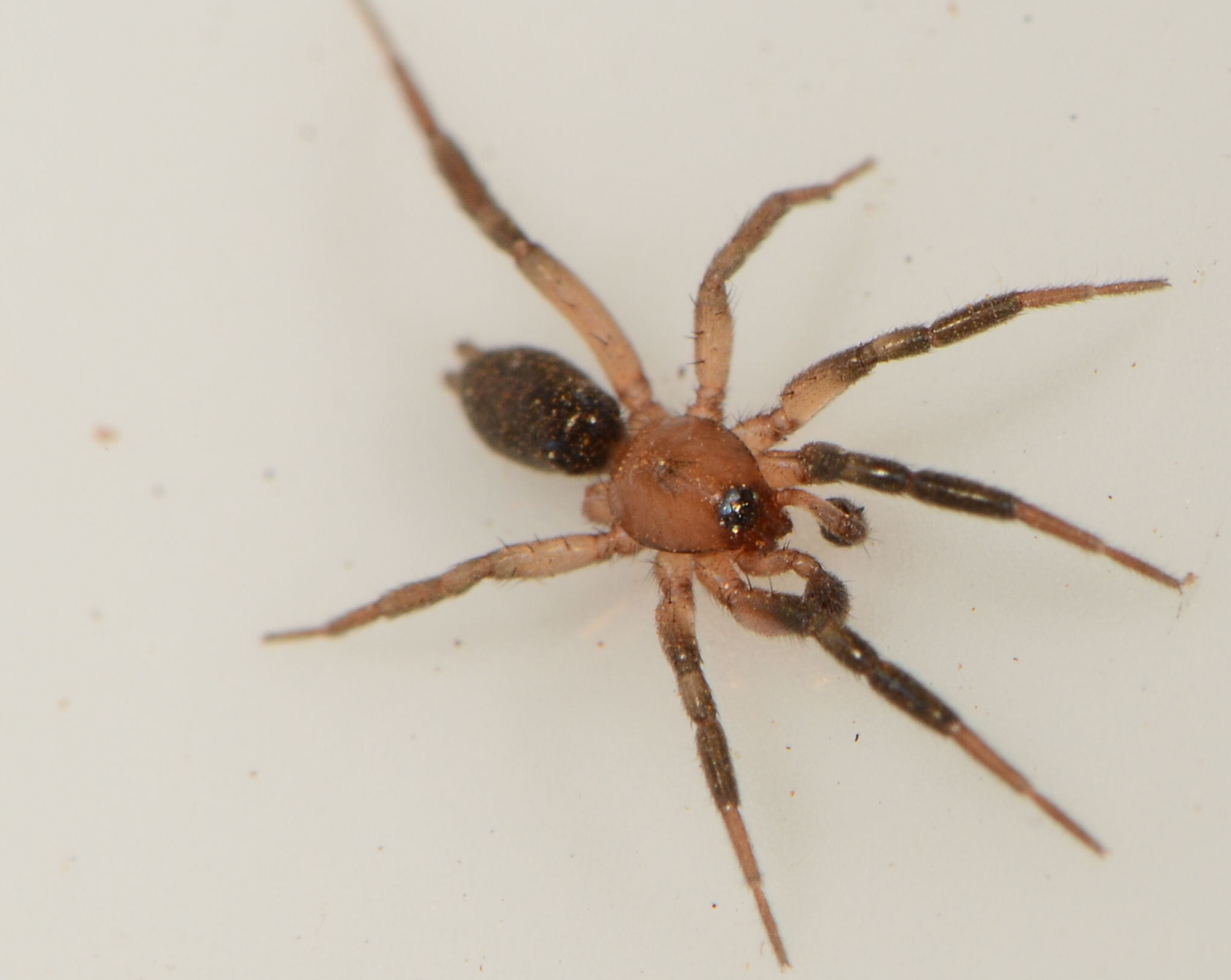
- male

Scientific classification
- Kingdom: Animalia
- Phylum: Arthropoda
- Subphylum: Chelicerata
- Class: Arachnida
- Order: Araneae
- Infraorder: Araneomorphae
- Family: Gnaphosidae
- Genus: Setaphis
- Species: S. subtilis

Binomial name
- Setaphis subtilis (Simon, 1897)

Synonyms
- Mulicymnis subtilis Simon, 1897; Mulicymnis lubrica Simon, 1905; Camillina lubrica Berland, 1919; Camillina luteus Tucker, 1923; Camillina berlandi Denis, 1945; Zelotes convolutus Denis, 1953; Drassodes oppenheimeri Tikader, 1973

= Setaphis subtilis =

Common Setaphis Ground Spider

Species of spider

Setaphis subtilis is a species of spider in the family Gnaphosidae. It has a very wide distribution from Africa to the Philippines and is commonly known as common Setaphis ground spider.

== Distribution ==
Setaphis subtilis is recorded from South Africa to the Philippines. In South Africa, it is found in all nine provinces at altitudes ranging from 103 to 1,730 m above sea level. Notable locations include Alicedale, Kirkwood, Bloemfontein, Pretoria, Irene, Kruger National Park, and De Hoop Nature Reserve.

== Habitat and ecology ==
The species is a free-living ground dweller found across multiple biomes including Fynbos, Nama Karoo, Savanna, Succulent Karoo, and Thicket. It has also been sampled from agricultural areas including cabbage, citrus, cotton, maize, pistachio, and tomato fields.

== Description ==
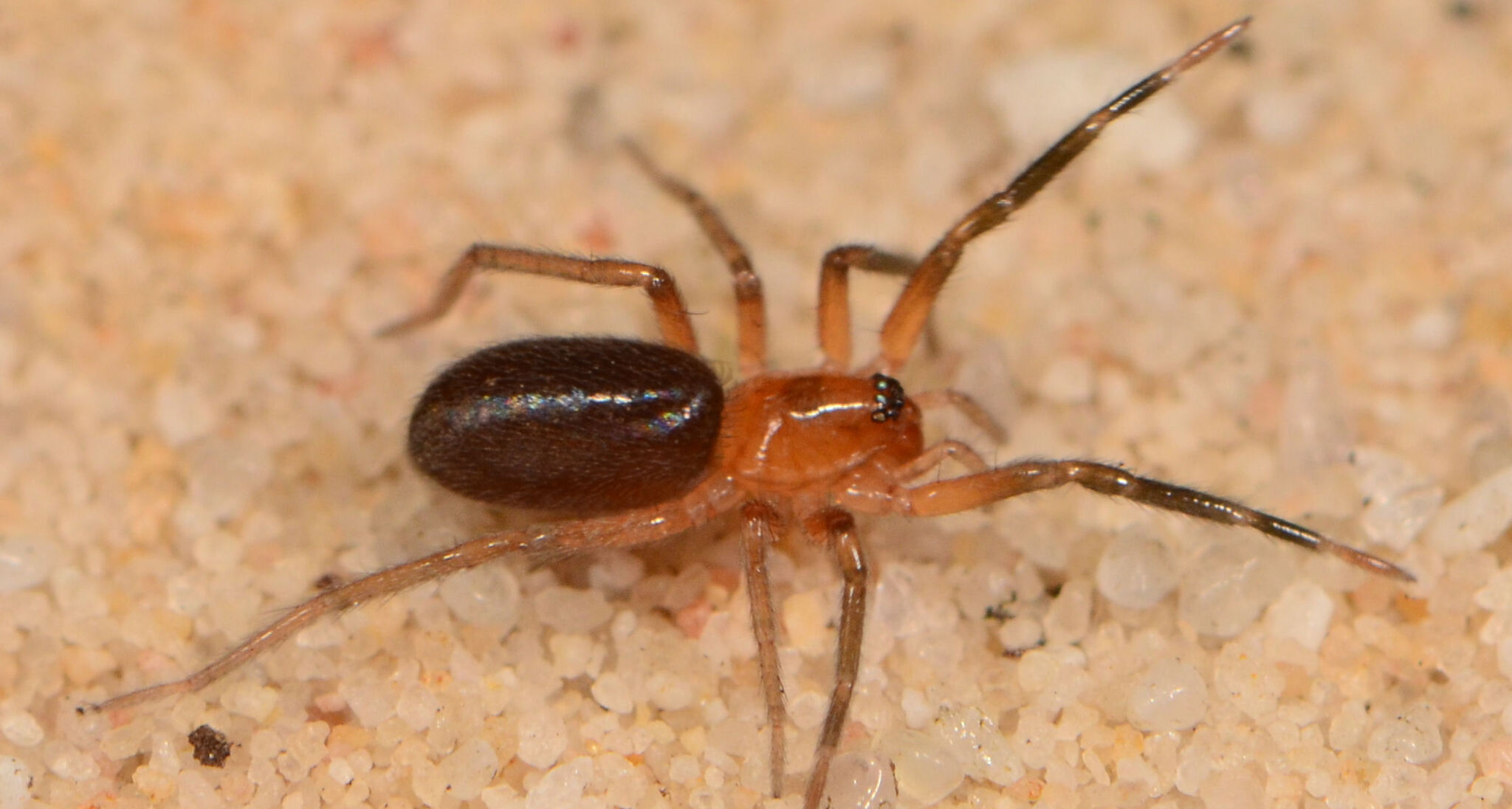
male

== Conservation ==
Setaphis subtilis is listed as Least Concern by the South African National Biodiversity Institute due to its wide range. The species faces no significant threats and is found in more than ten protected areas.

== Etymology ==
The species name subtilis means "fine" or "delicate" in Latin.

== Taxonomy ==
The species was originally described by Eugène Simon in 1897 as Mulicymnis subtilis. It has undergone extensive taxonomic revision with numerous synonyms. Platnick and Murphy (1996) transferred it to Setaphis and synonymized several species with it. It is known from both sexes.
