= Setaphis makalali =

Scientific classification
- Kingdom: Animalia
- Phylum: Arthropoda
- Subphylum: Chelicerata
- Class: Arachnida
- Order: Araneae
- Infraorder: Araneomorphae
- Family: Gnaphosidae
- Genus: Setaphis
- Species: S. makalali

Binomial name
- Setaphis makalali FitzPatrick, 2005

Species of spider

Setaphis makalali is a species of spider in the family Gnaphosidae. It is endemic to South Africa.

== Distribution ==
Setaphis makalali is known only from Limpopo Province, specifically the Makalali Nature Reserve.

== Habitat and ecology ==
The species is a free-running ground dweller found at an altitude of 468 m above sea level. It has been sampled from the Savanna biome.

== Conservation ==
Setaphis makalali is listed as Data Deficient by the South African National Biodiversity Institute as too little is known about the location, habitat and threats of this taxon for an assessment to be made. More sampling is needed to determine the species' range. The species is protected in the Makalali Nature Reserve.

== Etymology ==
The species name makalali refers to the Makalali Nature Reserve where it was discovered.

== Taxonomy ==
The species was described by FitzPatrick in 2005 from the Makalali Nature Reserve. It is known from both sexes.
