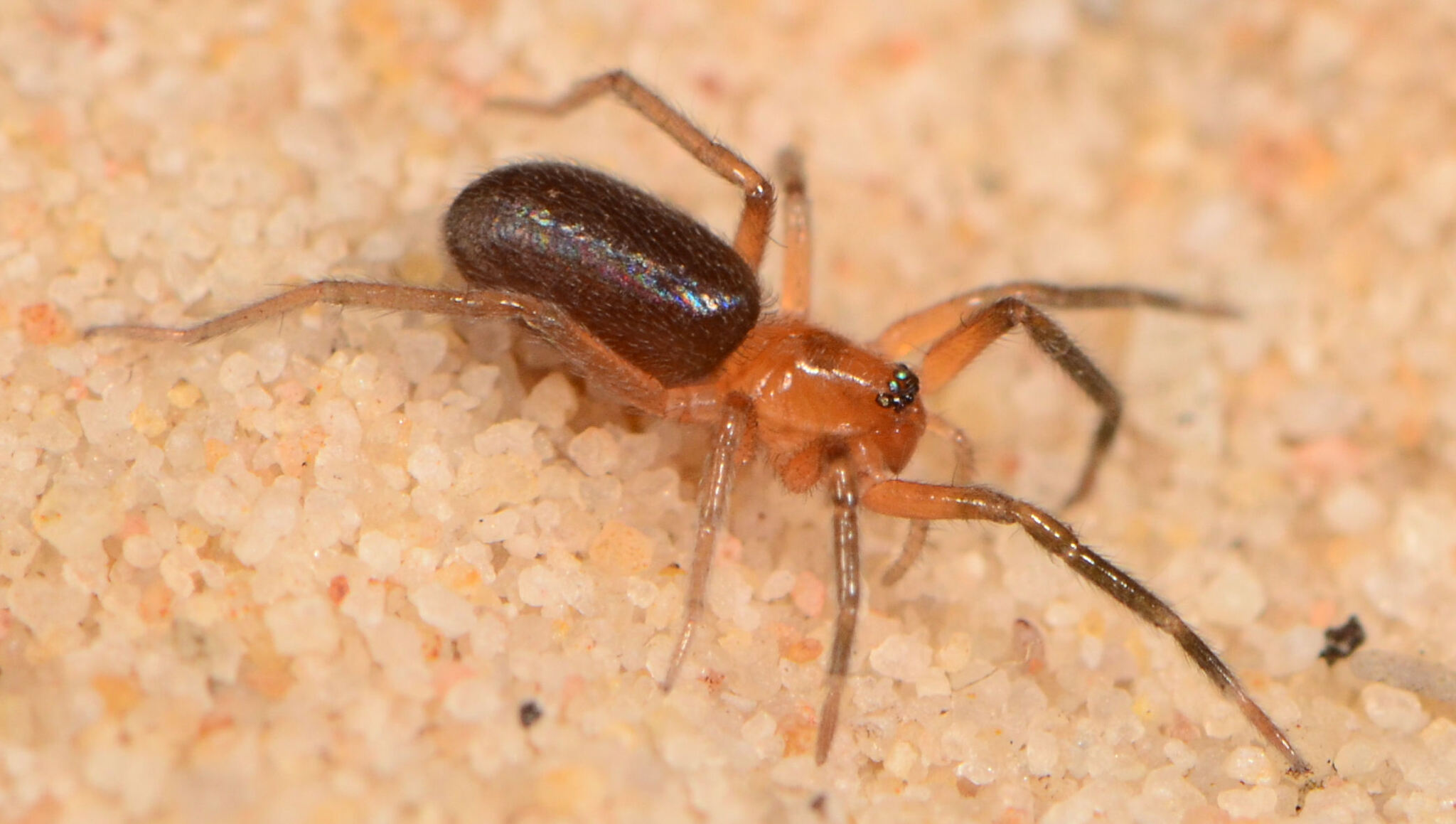
- male S. subtilis
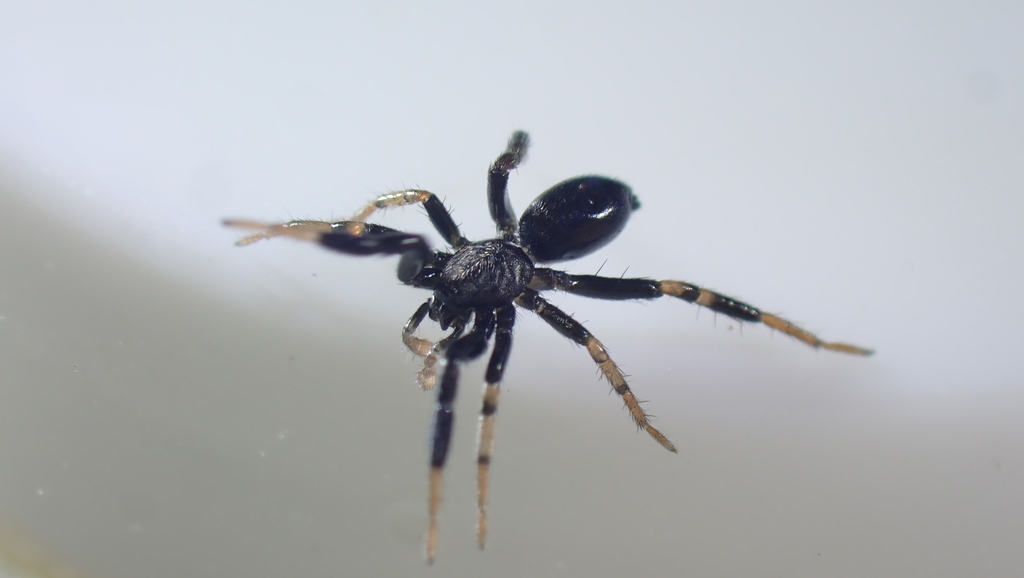
- S. carmeli

Scientific classification
- Kingdom: Animalia
- Phylum: Arthropoda
- Subphylum: Chelicerata
- Class: Arachnida
- Order: Araneae
- Infraorder: Araneomorphae
- Family: Gnaphosidae
- Genus: Setaphis; Simon, 1893

Type species
- S. parvula (Lucas, 1846)

Species
- 23, see text
- Range based on locations in WSC

= Setaphis =

Genus of spiders

Setaphis is a genus of ground spiders that was first described by Eugène Simon in 1893.

== Distribution ==
Spiders in this genus are found from the Mediterranean to the Philippines and parts of Africa.

== Species ==
As of September 2025, this genus includes 23 species:

- Setaphis algerica (Dalmas, 1922) – Spain, Algeria
- Setaphis atlantica (Berland, 1936) – Cape Verde
- Setaphis browni (Tucker, 1923) – Central and Southern Africa, Pakistan, India
- Setaphis canariensis (Simon, 1883) – Canary Islands, Madeira
- Setaphis carmeli (O. Pickard-Cambridge, 1872) – Canary Islands, Mediterranean, Iran
- Setaphis fuscipes (Simon, 1885) – Morocco, Israel
- Setaphis gomerae (Schmidt, 1981) – Canary Islands, Turkey?
- Setaphis jocquei Platnick & Murphy, 1996 – Ivory Coast
- Setaphis makalali FitzPatrick, 2005 – South Africa
- Setaphis mediterranea Levy, 2009 – Israel
- Setaphis mollis (O. Pickard-Cambridge, 1874) – Morocco, Egypt, Italy (Sicily), Israel
- Setaphis murphyi Wunderlich, 2011 – Canary Islands
- Setaphis parvula (Lucas, 1846) – Mediterranean (type species)
- Setaphis salrei Schmidt, 1999 – Cape Verde
- Setaphis sexmaculata Simon, 1893 – South Africa
- Setaphis simplex (Simon, 1885) – Morocco, Algeria, Tunisia, Libya
- Setaphis solanensis (Tikader & Gajbe, 1977) – India
- Setaphis spiribulbis (Denis, 1952) – Morocco
- Setaphis subtilis (Simon, 1897) – West and South Africa, Ethiopia, Egypt, Middle East, Pakistan, India, Thailand, Philippines
- Setaphis tikaderi (Gajbe, 1993) – India
- Setaphis villiersi (Denis, 1955) – Niger, Somalia, Ethiopia
- Setaphis walteri Platnick & Murphy, 1996 – Canary Islands
- Setaphis wunderlichi Platnick & Murphy, 1996 – Canary Islands
