= List of Chloropidae genera =

The fly family Chloropidae contains over 160 described genera. These include:

- Afrocelyphus
- Apallates
- Aphanotrigonum
- Apotropina
- Arcuator
- Assuania
- Biorbitella
- Cadrema
- Calamoncosis
- Camarota
- Capnoptera
- Caviceps
- Centorisoma
- Cetema
- Chaetochlorops
- Chlorops
- Chloropsina
- Conioscinella
- Cryptonevra
- Dasyopa
- Dicraeus
- Diplotoxa
- Diplotoxoides
- Dysartia
- Ectecephala
- Elachiptera
- Elachiptereicus
- Elliponeura
- Epichlorops
- Eribolus
- Eugaurax
- Eurina
- Eutropha
- Fiebrigella
- Gampsocera
- Gaurax
- Hapleginella
- Hippelates
- Homalura
- Homaluroides
- Incertella
- Lagaroceras
- Lasiambia
- Lasiosina
- Liohippelates
- Lipara
- Malloewia
- Melanochaeta
- Melanum
- Meromyza
- Metopostigma
- Microcercis
- Monochaetoscinella
- Neodiplotoxa
- Neohaplegis
- Neoscinella
- Olcella
- Opetiophora
- Oscinella
- Oscinimorpha
- Oscinisoma
- Oscinoides
- Paraeurina
- Parectecephala
- Phyladelphus
- Platycephala
- Platycephalisca
- Polyodaspis
- Pseudogaurax
- Pseudopachychaeta
- Rhodesiella
- Rhopalopterum
- Sacatonia
- Sabroskyina
- Scoliophthalmus
- Siphonella
- Siphonellopsis
- Siphunculina
- Speccafrons
- Stenoscinis
- Strobliola
- Thaumatomyia
- Trachysiphonella
- Trichieurina
- Tricimba
- Trigonomma
- Xena
