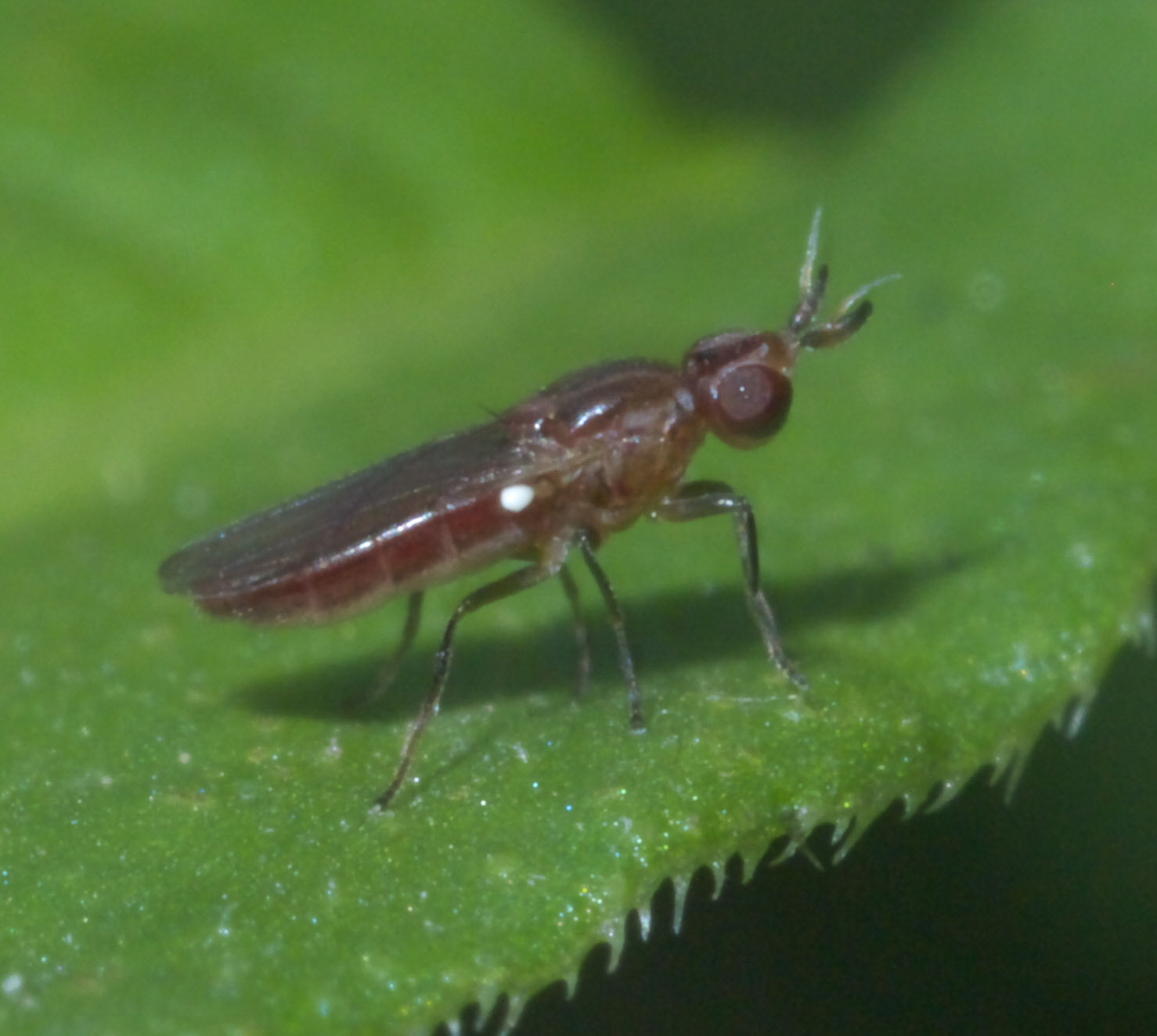
- Ectecephala albistylum

Scientific classification
- Kingdom: Animalia
- Phylum: Arthropoda
- Class: Insecta
- Order: Diptera
- Family: Chloropidae
- Subfamily: Chloropinae; Rondani, 1856

= Chloropinae =

Subfamily of flies

Chloropinae is a subfamily of grass flies in the family Chloropidae.

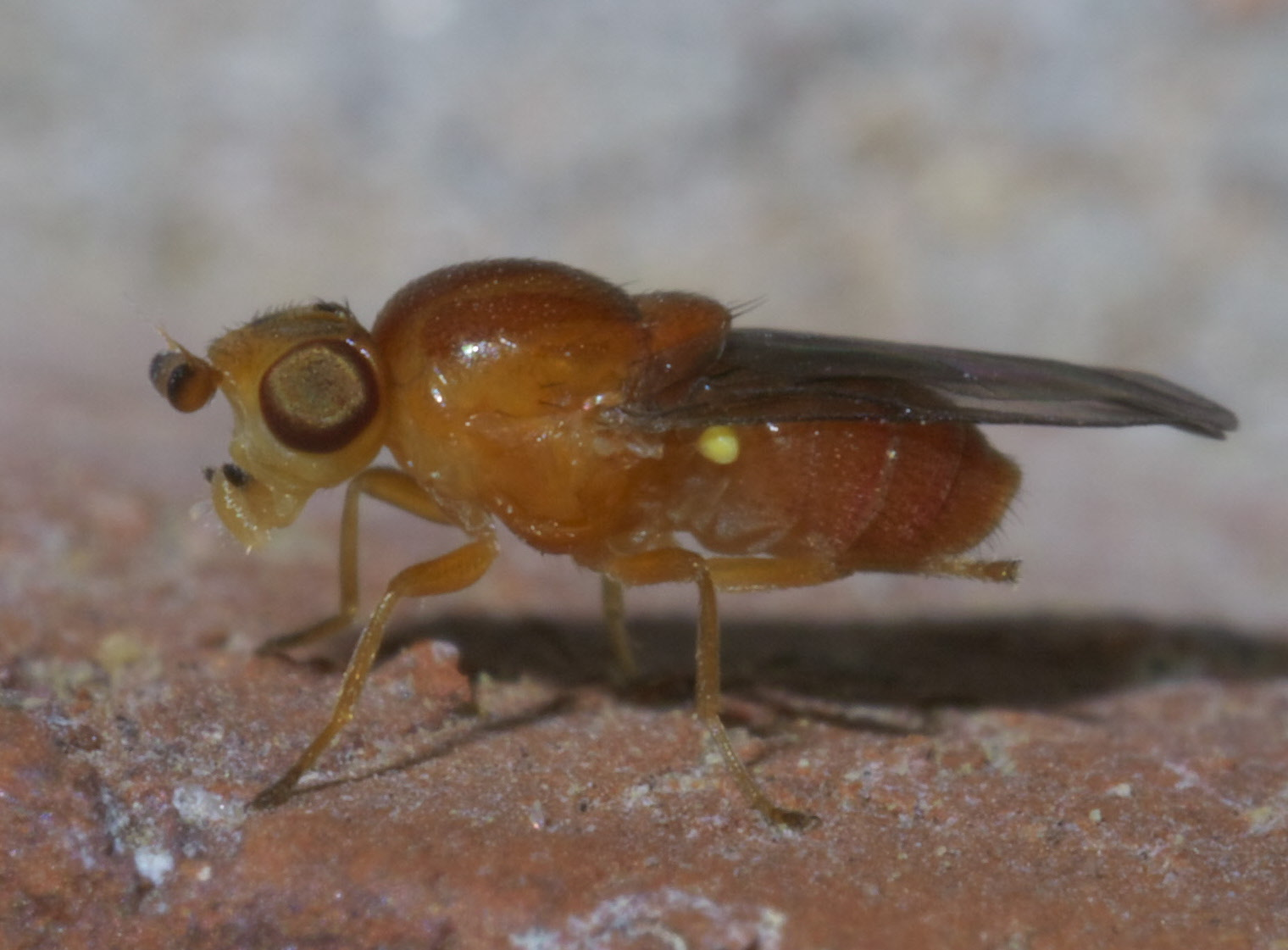
Grass flies, Chloropinae

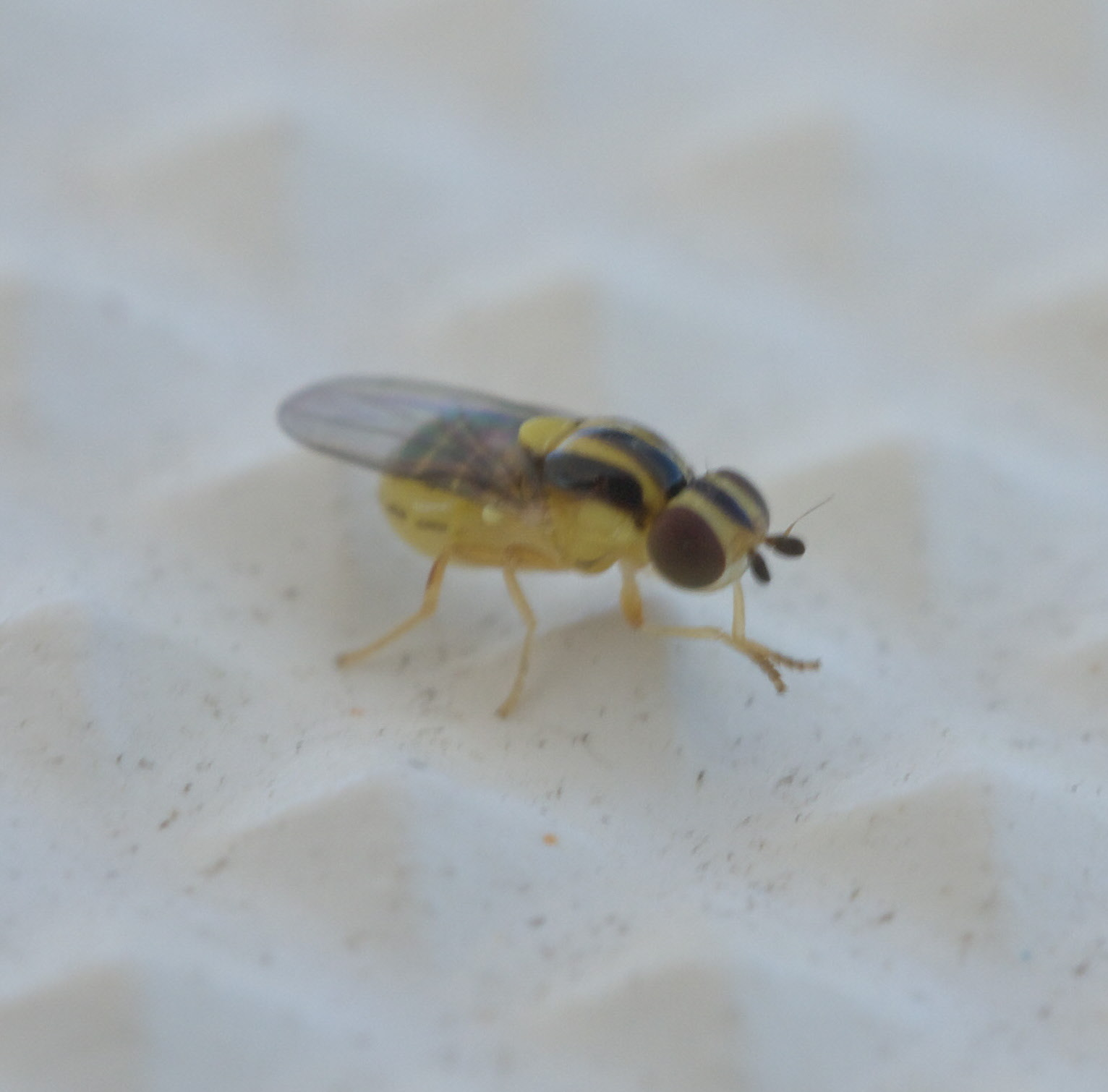
Grass flies, Chloropinae

== Genera ==
These 76 genera belong to the subfamily Chloropinae:

- Anathracophaga
- Anthracophagella Anderson, 1977^{c g}
- Aragara Walker, 1860^{c g}
- Archimeromyza Deeming, 1981^{c g}
- Assuania Becker, 1903^{c g}
- Bathyparia Lamb, 1917^{c g}
- Bothynocerus Paganelli, 2002
- Bricelochlorops Paganelli 2002^{g}
- Camarota Meigen, 1830^{c g}
- Capnoptera Loew, 1866^{c g}
- Centorisoma Becker, 1910^{c g}
- Cerais Wulp, 1881^{c g}
- Cetema Hendel, 1907^{i c g b}
- Chloromerus Becker, 1911^{c g}
- Chloropella Malloch, 1925^{c g}
- Chlorops Meigen, 1803^{i g b}
- Chloropsina Becker, 1911^{i c g}
- Chromatopterum Becker, 1910^{c g}
- Collessimyia Spencer, 1986^{c g}
- Coniochlorops Duda, 1934^{c g}
- Cordylosomides Strand, 1928^{c g}
- Coroichlorops Paganelli, 2002^{g}
- Cryptonevra Lioy, 1864^{c g}
- Desertochlorops Narchuk, 1966^{c g}
- Diplotoxa Loew, 1863^{i c g b}
- Dudeurina Ismay, 1995
- Ectecephala Macquart, 1851^{i c g b}
- Ectecephalina Paganelli, 2002
- Elachiptereicus Becker, 1909^{c g}
- Elliponeura Loew, 1869^{i c g}
- Ensiferella Andersson, 1977^{c g}
- Epichlorops Becker, 1910^{i c g b}
- Eurina Meigen, 1830^{c g}
- Eutropha Loew, 1855^{c g}
- Homalura Meigen, 1826^{c g}
- Homaluroides Sabrosky, 1980^{i c g b}
- Homops Speiser, 1923^{c g}
- Ischnochlorops Paganelli, 2002^{g}
- Lagaroceras Becker, 1903^{c g}
- Lasiosina Becker, 1910^{i c g b}
- Lieparella Spencer, 1986^{c g}
- Luzonia Frey, 1923
- Melanum Becker, 1910^{c g}
- Mepachymerus (Steleocerellus)^{c g}
- Merochlorops Hewlett, 1909^{c g}
- Meromyza Meigen, 1830^{i c g b}
- Meromyzella Andersson, 1977^{c g}
- Metopostigma Becker, 1903^{c g}
- Neodiplotoxa Malloch, 1914^{i c g b}
- Neohaplegis Beschovski, 1981a
- Neoloxotaenia Sabrosky^{i c g}
- Pachylophus Loew, 1858^{c g}
- Paracamarota Cherian, 1991^{c g}
- Paraeurina Duda, 1933^{c g}
- Parectecephala Becker, 1910^{i c g b}
- Pemphigonotus Lamb, 1917^{c g}
- Phyladelphus Becker, 1910^{c g}
- Platycephala Fallén, 1820^{g}
- Platycephalisca Nartshuk, 1959^{c g}
- Pseudochromatopterum Deeming, 1981^{c g}
- Pseudopachychaeta Strobl, 1902^{i c g b}
- Pseudothaumatomyia Narchuk, 1963^{c g}
- Psilochlorops Duda, 1930^{c g}
- Sagarocerus Paganelli, 2002
- Semaranga Becker^{i c g}
- Sineurina Yang & Yang, 1992
- Siphlus Loew, 1858^{c g}
- Steleocerellus Frey, 1961^{c g}
- Stenophthalmus Becker, 1903^{c g}
- Terusa Kanmiya, 1983^{c}
- Thaumatomyia Zenker, 1833^{i c g b}
- Thressa Walker, 1860^{c g}
- Trichieurina Duda^{c g}
- Trigonomma Enderlein, 1911^{i c g}
- Urubambina Paganelli, 2002
- Xena Nartshuk, 1964^{c g}

Data sources: i = ITIS, c = Catalogue of Life, g = GBIF, b = Bugguide.net
