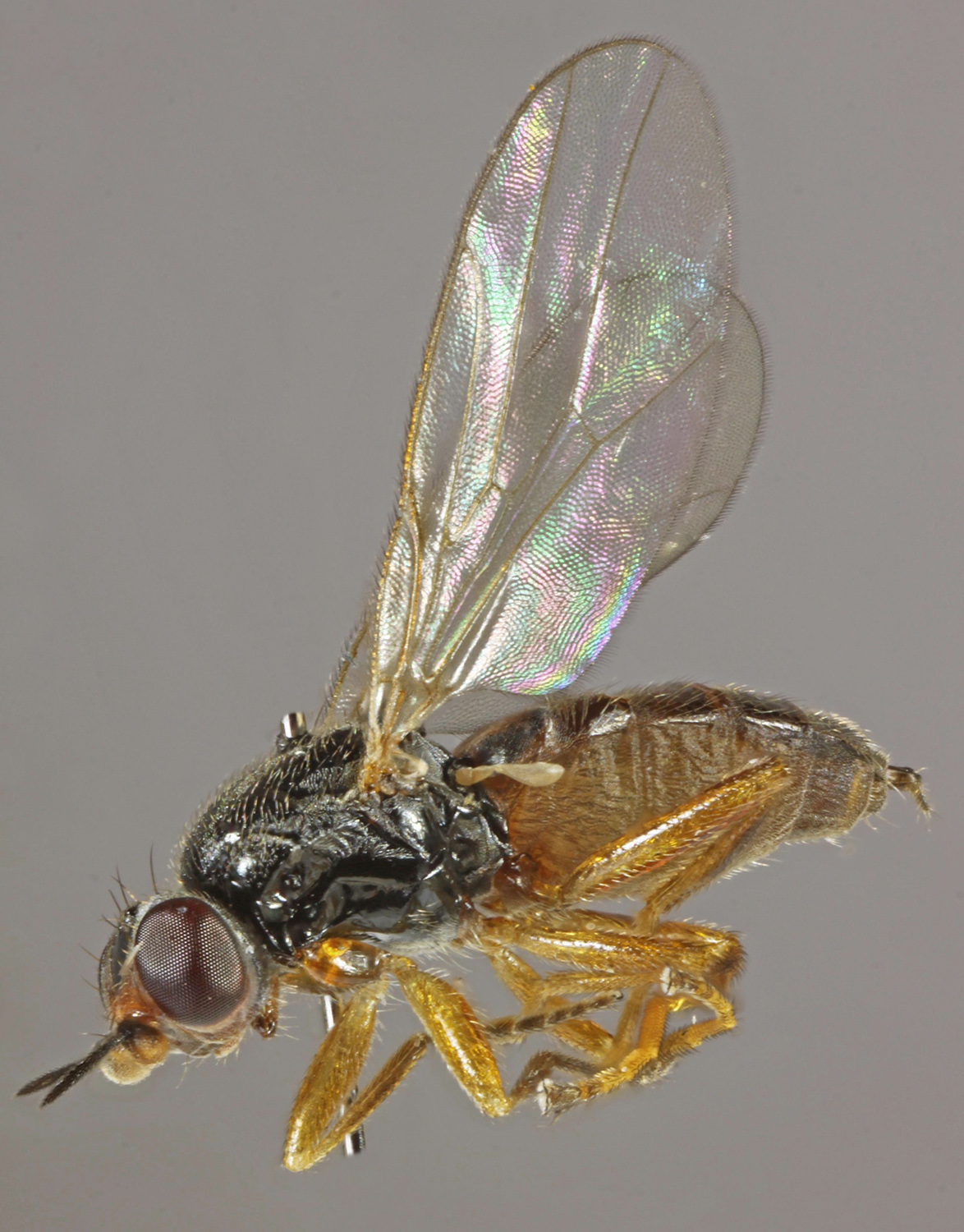
- Elachiptera cornuta North Wales

Scientific classification
- Kingdom: Animalia
- Phylum: Arthropoda
- Class: Insecta
- Order: Diptera
- Family: Chloropidae
- Genus: Elachiptera
- Species: E. cornuta

Binomial name
- Elachiptera cornuta (Fallén, 1820)

Synonyms
- Oscinis cornuta Fallén, 1820; Elachiptera nigromaculata Strobl, 1894

= Elachiptera cornuta =

Species of fly

Elachiptera cornuta is a species of fly in the family Chloropidae, the grass flies. It is found in the Palearctic. The larva feeds on Poaceae.It is a pest of maize and wheat.
