= H. nobilis =

H. nobilis may refer to:

- Hippelates nobilis, Loew, 1863, an eye gnat species in the genus Hippelates
- Hypophthalmichthys nobilis, the bighead carp, a freshwater fish species

== Synonyms ==
- Hepatica nobilis, a synonym for Anemone hepatica, the kidneywort, liverwort, pennywort or common hepatica, an herbaceous plant species native to the forest floors of temperate regions of the Northern Hemisphere

== See also ==
- Nobilis (disambiguation)
