= Chromatopterum =

Scientific classification
- Domain: Eukaryota
- Kingdom: Animalia
- Phylum: Arthropoda
- Class: Insecta
- Order: Diptera
- Family: Chloropidae
- Subfamily: Chloropinae
- Genus: Chromatopterum; Becker, 1910

Genus of flies

Chromatopterum is a genus of flies in the family Chloropidae (insects commonly known as fruit flies).

== Species ==
- Chromatopterum brevicercum Liu, Nartshuk & Yang, 2017
- Chromatopterum delicatum Becker, 1910
- Chromatopterum dimidiatum Deeming, 1981
- Chromatopterum ghanaensis Deeming, 1981
- Chromatopterum linguatum Séguy, 1957
- Chromatopterum longiclavatum Liu, Nartshuk & Yang, 2017: 283
- Chromatopterum mirabilis Deeming, 1981
- Chromatopterum nusantarum Kanmiya & Yukawa, 1985
- Chromatopterum pubescens Becker, 1911
- Chromatopterum suffusum Sabrosky, 1951
- Chromatopterum tibiale Malloch, 1931

Names brought to synonymy

- Chromatopterum amabile, synonym of Chloropsina amabile
- Chromatopterum ambiguum, synonym of Chloropsina ambigua
- Chromatopterum costale, synonym of Chloropsina costale
- Chromatopterum difficile, synonym of Chloropsina difficilis
- Chromatopterum elegans, synonym of Chloropsina elegans
- Chromatopterum lacreiventre, synonym of Chloropsina lacreiventris
- Chromatopterum minus, synonym of Chloropsina minus
- Chromatopterum simile, synonym of Chloropsina simile
- Chromatopterum sumatranum, synonym of Chloropsina sumatrana
- Chromatopterum triangulare, synonym of Chloropsina triangularis
