= Pseudogaurax signatus =

Scientific classification
- Domain: Eukaryota
- Kingdom: Animalia
- Phylum: Arthropoda
- Class: Insecta
- Order: Diptera
- Family: Chloropidae
- Genus: Pseudogaurax
- Species: P. signatus

Binomial name
- Pseudogaurax signatus (Loew, 1876)

Synonyms
- Gaurax araneae Coquillett, 1896; Gaurax mallochi Duda, 1930; Gaurax signatus Loew, 1876

Species of fly

Pseudogaurax signatus is a species of frit fly in the family Chloropidae.
