= Elachiptera longiventris =

Scientific classification
- Domain: Eukaryota
- Kingdom: Animalia
- Phylum: Arthropoda
- Class: Insecta
- Order: Diptera
- Family: Chloropidae
- Genus: Elachiptera
- Species: E. longiventris

Binomial name
- Elachiptera longiventris (Johannsen, 1924)

Synonyms
- Melanochaeta longiventris Johannsen, 1924

Species of fly

Elachiptera longiventris is a species of frit fly in the family Chloropidae.
