= Elachiptera costata =

Scientific classification
- Domain: Eukaryota
- Kingdom: Animalia
- Phylum: Arthropoda
- Class: Insecta
- Order: Diptera
- Family: Chloropidae
- Genus: Elachiptera
- Species: E. costata

Binomial name
- Elachiptera costata (Loew, 1863)

Synonyms
- Crassiseta costata Loew, 1863

Species of frit fly

Elachiptera costata is a species of frit fly in the family Chloropidae.
