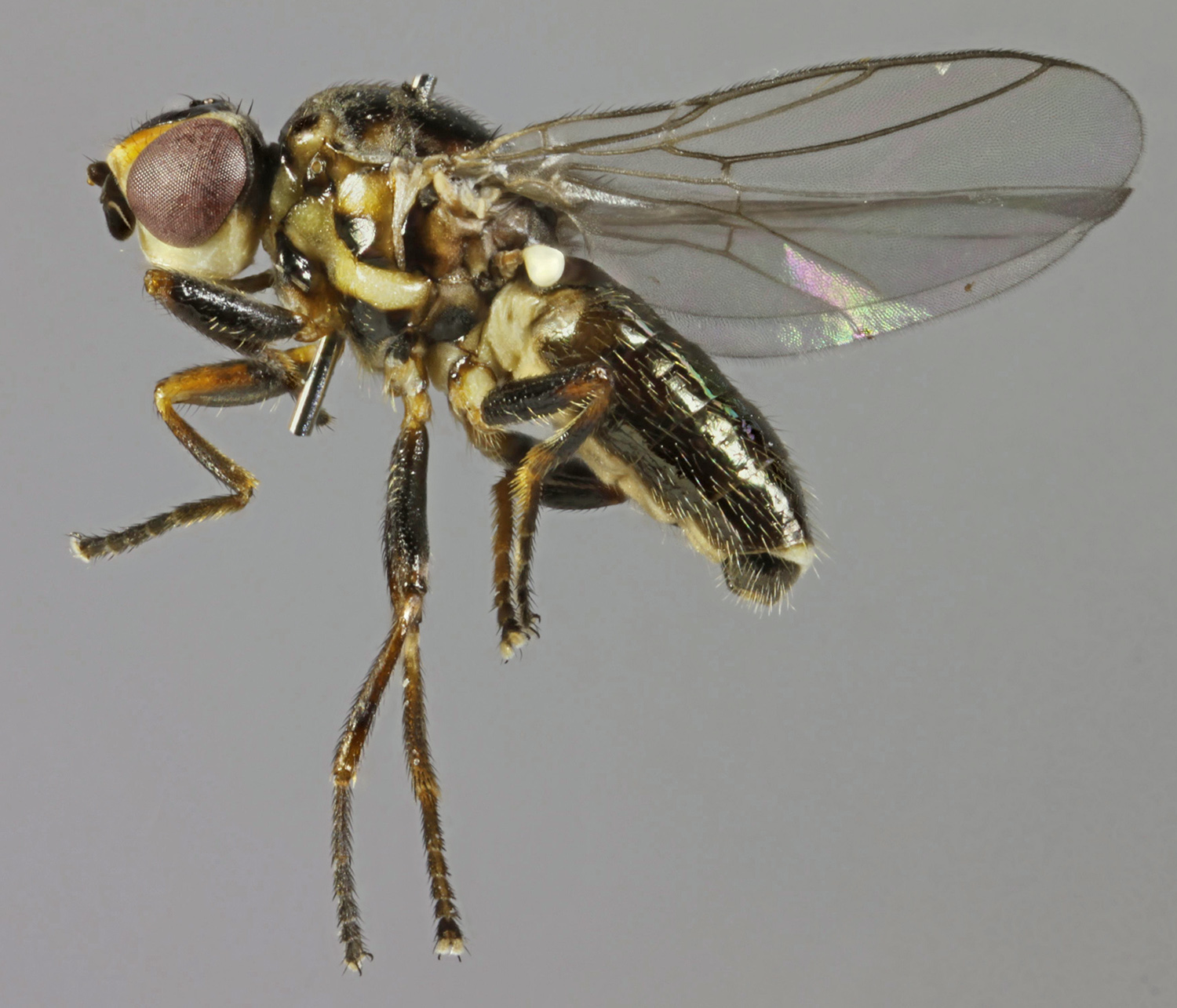
- Diplotoxa messoria North Wales

Scientific classification
- Domain: Eukaryota
- Kingdom: Animalia
- Phylum: Arthropoda
- Class: Insecta
- Order: Diptera
- Family: Chloropidae
- Genus: Diplotoxa
- Species: D. messoria

Binomial name
- Diplotoxa messoria (Fallén, 1820)

Synonyms
- Oscinis messoria Fallén, 1820

= Diplotoxa messoria =

Species of fly

Diplotoxa messoria is a species of fly in the family Chloropidae, the grass flies. It is found in the Palearctic. The larva feeds on Poaceae.
