= Elachiptera nigriceps =

Scientific classification
- Domain: Eukaryota
- Kingdom: Animalia
- Phylum: Arthropoda
- Class: Insecta
- Order: Diptera
- Family: Chloropidae
- Genus: Elachiptera
- Species: E. nigriceps

Binomial name
- Elachiptera nigriceps (Loew, 1863)

Synonyms
- Crassiseta nigriceps Loew, 1863

Species of fly

Elachiptera nigriceps is a species of frit fly in the family Chloropidae.
