= Malloewia abdominalis =

Scientific classification
- Domain: Eukaryota
- Kingdom: Animalia
- Phylum: Arthropoda
- Class: Insecta
- Order: Diptera
- Family: Chloropidae
- Genus: Malloewia
- Species: M. abdominalis

Binomial name
- Malloewia abdominalis (Becker, 1912)

Synonyms
- Oscinella bifurca Becker, 1912; Siphonella abdominalis Becker, 1912

Species of fly

Malloewia abdominalis is a species of frit fly in the family Chloropidae.
