= Chloropsina elegans =

Scientific classification
- Kingdom: Animalia
- Phylum: Arthropoda
- Class: Insecta
- Order: Diptera
- Family: Chloropidae
- Subfamily: Chloropinae
- Genus: Chloropsina
- Species: C. elegans

Binomial name
- Chloropsina elegans (Bezzi, 1913)

Synonyms
- Chromatopterum elegans Bezzi, 1913

Species of fly

Chloropsina elegans is a species of fly in the family Chloropidae. It is found in the Philippines (Luzon).
