= Hippelates plebejus =

Scientific classification
- Domain: Eukaryota
- Kingdom: Animalia
- Phylum: Arthropoda
- Class: Insecta
- Order: Diptera
- Family: Chloropidae
- Genus: Hippelates
- Species: H. plebejus

Binomial name
- Hippelates plebejus Loew, 1863

Species of fly

Hippelates plebejus is a species of frit fly in the family Chloropidae.
