= Hippelates proboscideus =

Scientific classification
- Domain: Eukaryota
- Kingdom: Animalia
- Phylum: Arthropoda
- Class: Insecta
- Order: Diptera
- Family: Chloropidae
- Genus: Hippelates
- Species: H. proboscideus

Binomial name
- Hippelates proboscideus Williston, 1896

Species of fly

Hippelates proboscideus is a species of frit fly in the family Chloropidae.
