= Olcella parva =

Scientific classification
- Domain: Eukaryota
- Kingdom: Animalia
- Phylum: Arthropoda
- Class: Insecta
- Order: Diptera
- Family: Chloropidae
- Genus: Olcella
- Species: O. parva

Binomial name
- Olcella parva (Adams, 1904)

Synonyms
- Siphonella parva Adams, 1904

Species of fly

Olcella parva, the chloropid fly, is a species of frit fly in the family Chloropidae.
