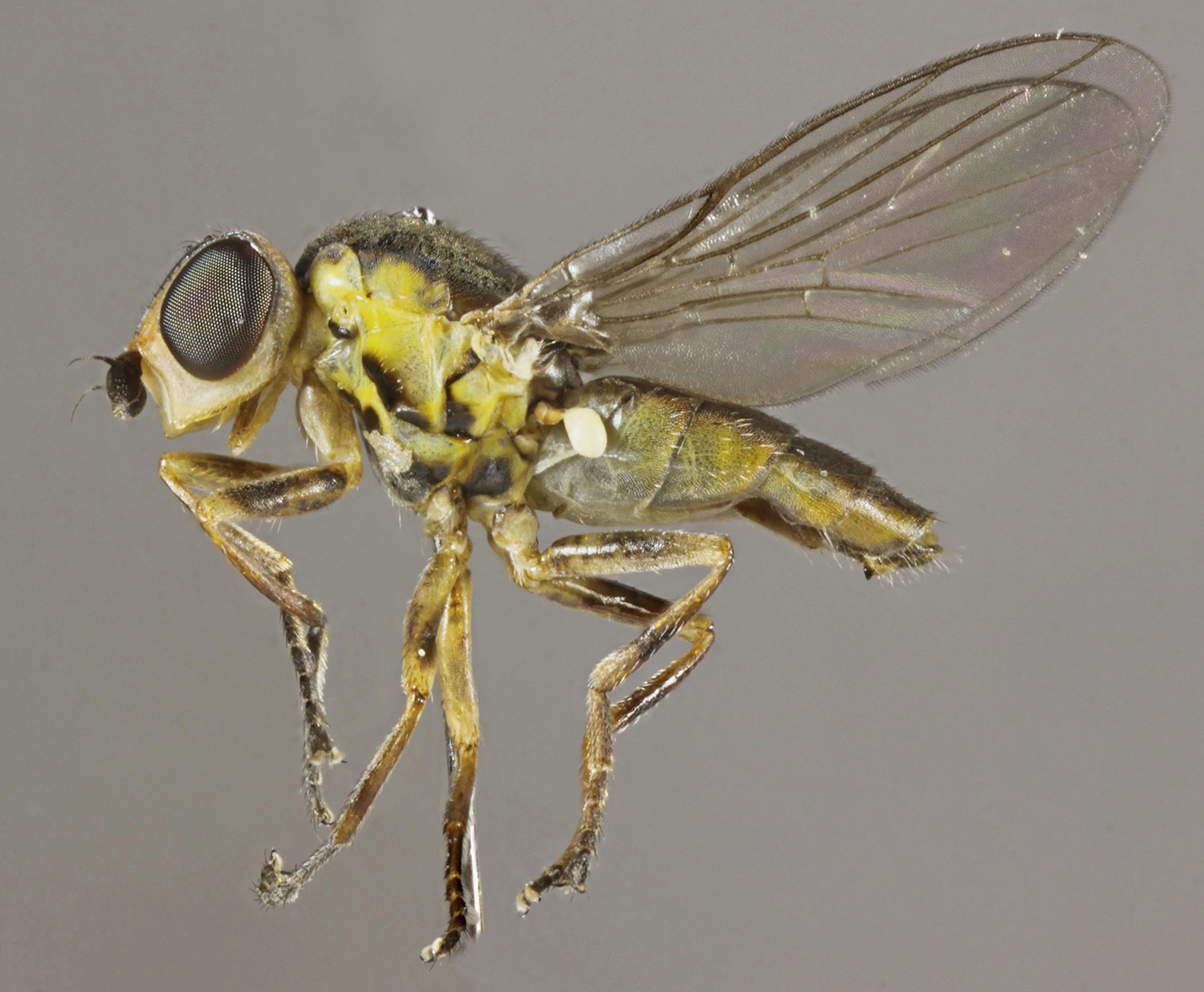
- Melanum laterale North Wales

Scientific classification
- Kingdom: Animalia
- Phylum: Arthropoda
- Class: Insecta
- Order: Diptera
- Family: Chloropidae
- Genus: Melanum
- Species: M. laterale

Binomial name
- Melanum laterale (Haliday, 1833)

Synonyms
- Chlorops laterale Haliday, 1833

= Melanum laterale =

Species of fly

Melanum laterale is a species of fly in the family Chloropidae, the grass flies. It is found in the Palearctic. The larva feeds on Poaceae.
