= Conioscinella elegans =

Scientific classification
- Kingdom: Animalia
- Phylum: Arthropoda
- Class: Insecta
- Order: Diptera
- Family: Chloropidae
- Genus: Conioscinella
- Species: C. elegans

Binomial name
- Conioscinella elegans Becker, 1910

Synonyms
- Oscinella elegans (Becker, 1910)

Species of fly

Conioscinella elegans is a species of eye flies in the genus of Conioscinella. It is found in Europe.
