= Oscinisoma alienum =

Scientific classification
- Domain: Eukaryota
- Kingdom: Animalia
- Phylum: Arthropoda
- Class: Insecta
- Order: Diptera
- Family: Chloropidae
- Genus: Oscinisoma
- Species: O. alienum

Binomial name
- Oscinisoma alienum (Becker, 1912)

Synonyms
- Elachiptera aliena Becker, 1912

Species of fly

Oscinisoma alienum is a species of frit fly in the family Chloropidae.
