= Stenoscinis longipes =

Scientific classification
- Domain: Eukaryota
- Kingdom: Animalia
- Phylum: Arthropoda
- Class: Insecta
- Order: Diptera
- Family: Chloropidae
- Genus: Stenoscinis
- Species: S. longipes

Binomial name
- Stenoscinis longipes (Loew, 1863)

Synonyms
- Oscinis longipes Loew, 1863

Species of fly

Stenoscinis longipes is a species of frit fly in the family Chloropidae.
