= Gaurax dorsalis =

Scientific classification
- Domain: Eukaryota
- Kingdom: Animalia
- Phylum: Arthropoda
- Class: Insecta
- Order: Diptera
- Family: Chloropidae
- Genus: Gaurax
- Species: G. dorsalis

Binomial name
- Gaurax dorsalis (Loew, 1863)

Species of fly

Gaurax dorsalis is a species of frit fly in the family Chloropidae.
