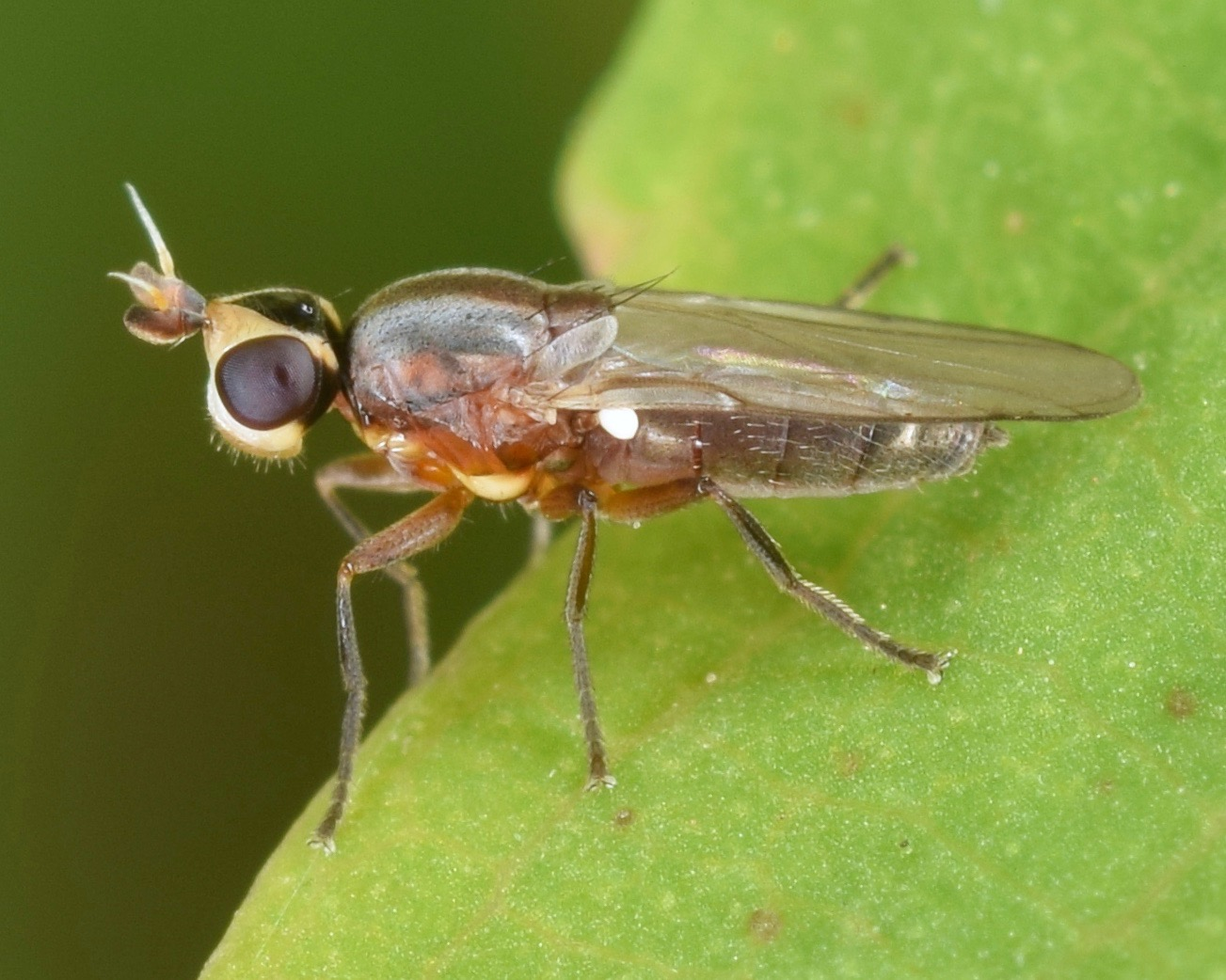

Scientific classification
- Domain: Eukaryota
- Kingdom: Animalia
- Phylum: Arthropoda
- Class: Insecta
- Order: Diptera
- Family: Chloropidae
- Genus: Diplotoxa
- Species: D. versicolor

Binomial name
- Diplotoxa versicolor (Loew, 1863)

Synonyms
- Chlorops versicolor Loew, 1863

= Diplotoxa versicolor =

Species of fly

Diplotoxa versicolor is a species of grass fly in the family Chloropidae.
