= Tricimba lineella =

Scientific classification
- Domain: Eukaryota
- Kingdom: Animalia
- Phylum: Arthropoda
- Class: Insecta
- Order: Diptera
- Family: Chloropidae
- Genus: Tricimba
- Species: T. lineella

Binomial name
- Tricimba lineella (Fallen, 1820)

Synonyms
- Oscinis lineella Fallen, 1820

Species of fly

Tricimba lineella is a species of frit fly in the family Chloropidae. It is found in Europe.
