= Gaurax shannoni =

Scientific classification
- Domain: Eukaryota
- Kingdom: Animalia
- Phylum: Arthropoda
- Class: Insecta
- Order: Diptera
- Family: Chloropidae
- Genus: Gaurax
- Species: G. shannoni

Binomial name
- Gaurax shannoni Sabrosky, 1951

Species of fly

Gaurax shannoni is a species of frit fly in the family Chloropidae.
