= Elachiptera angusta =

Scientific classification
- Domain: Eukaryota
- Kingdom: Animalia
- Phylum: Arthropoda
- Class: Insecta
- Order: Diptera
- Family: Chloropidae
- Genus: Elachiptera
- Species: E. angusta

Binomial name
- Elachiptera angusta Sabrosky, 1948

Species of fly

Elachiptera angusta is a species of frit fly in the family Chloropidae.
