= Ectecephala laticornis =

Scientific classification
- Domain: Eukaryota
- Kingdom: Animalia
- Phylum: Arthropoda
- Class: Insecta
- Order: Diptera
- Family: Chloropidae
- Genus: Ectecephala
- Species: E. laticornis

Binomial name
- Ectecephala laticornis Coquillett, 1910

Species of fly

Ectecephala laticornis is a species of grass fly in the family Chloropidae.
