= Pseudogaurax anchora =

Scientific classification
- Domain: Eukaryota
- Kingdom: Animalia
- Phylum: Arthropoda
- Class: Insecta
- Order: Diptera
- Family: Chloropidae
- Genus: Pseudogaurax
- Species: P. anchora

Binomial name
- Pseudogaurax anchora (Loew, 1866)

Synonyms
- Elachiptera dispar Williston, 1896; Gaurax anchora Loew, 1866

Species of fly

Pseudogaurax anchora is a species of frit fly in the family Chloropidae.
