= Gaurax melanotum =

Scientific classification
- Domain: Eukaryota
- Kingdom: Animalia
- Phylum: Arthropoda
- Class: Insecta
- Order: Diptera
- Family: Chloropidae
- Subfamily: Oscinellinae
- Genus: Gaurax
- Species: G. melanotum

Binomial name
- Gaurax melanotum Sabrosky, 1951

Species of fly

Gaurax melanotum is a species of frit fly in the family Chloropidae.
