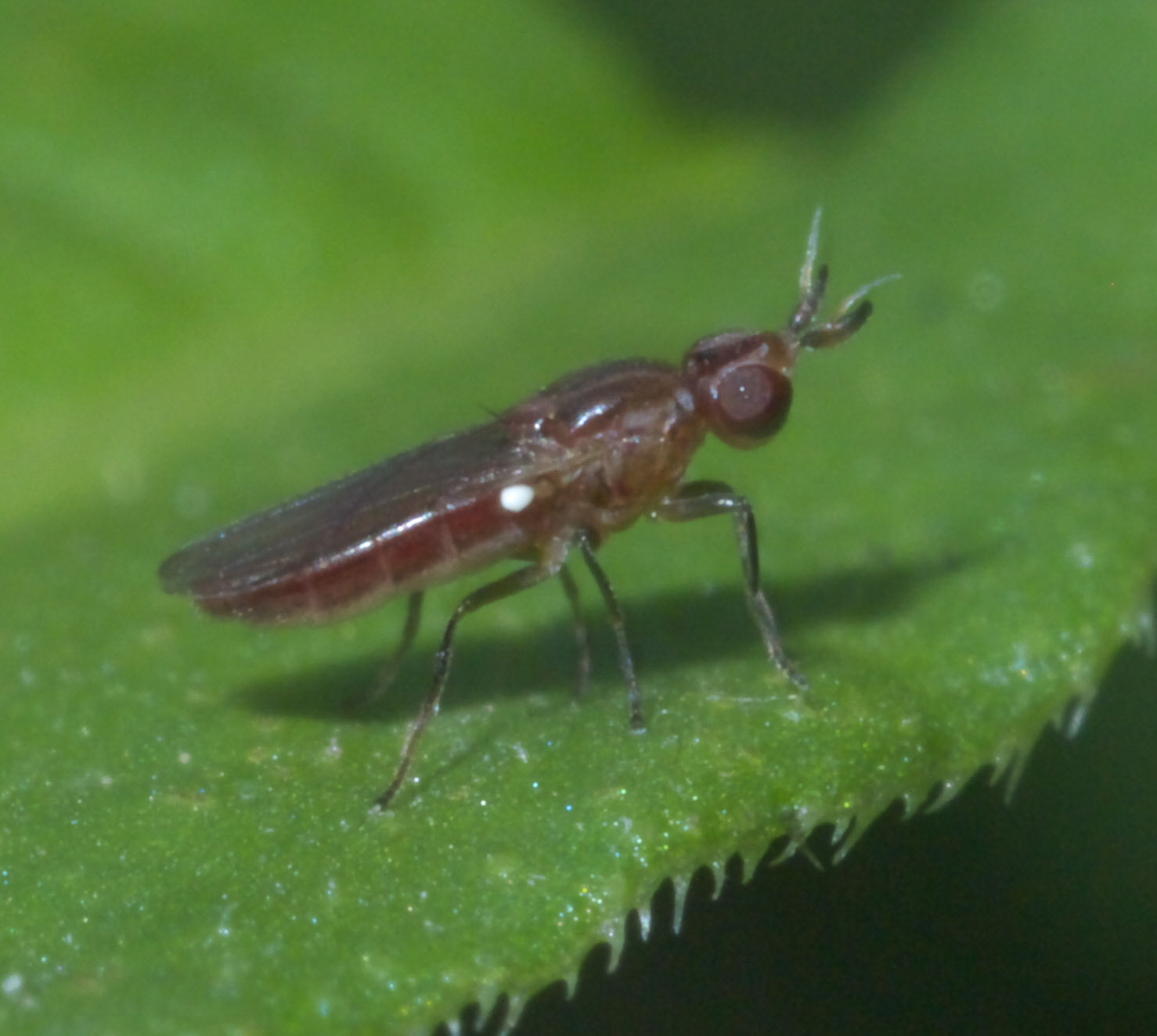

Scientific classification
- Domain: Eukaryota
- Kingdom: Animalia
- Phylum: Arthropoda
- Class: Insecta
- Order: Diptera
- Family: Chloropidae
- Genus: Ectecephala
- Species: E. albistylum

Binomial name
- Ectecephala albistylum Macquart, 1851

Synonyms
- Ectecephala laevifrons Authors, 1912

= Ectecephala albistylum =

Species of fly

Ectecephala albistylum is a species of grass fly in the family Chloropidae.
