= Chaetochlorops inquilinus =

Scientific classification
- Domain: Eukaryota
- Kingdom: Animalia
- Phylum: Arthropoda
- Class: Insecta
- Order: Diptera
- Family: Chloropidae
- Genus: Chaetochlorops
- Species: C. inquilinus

Binomial name
- Chaetochlorops inquilinus (Coquillett, 1898)

Synonyms
- Siphonella inquilina Coquillett, 1898

Species of fly

Chaetochlorops inquilinus is a species of frit fly in the family Chloropidae.
