= Gaurax pseudostigma =

Scientific classification
- Domain: Eukaryota
- Kingdom: Animalia
- Phylum: Arthropoda
- Class: Insecta
- Order: Diptera
- Family: Chloropidae
- Genus: Gaurax
- Species: G. pseudostigma

Binomial name
- Gaurax pseudostigma Johnson, 1913

Synonyms
- Gaurax flavidulus Malloch, 1915; Gaurax interruptus Malloch, 1915

Species of fly

Gaurax pseudostigma is a species of frit fly in the family Chloropidae.
