= Pseudopachychaeta =

Scientific classification
- Kingdom: Animalia
- Phylum: Arthropoda
- Class: Insecta
- Order: Diptera
- Family: Chloropidae
- Subfamily: Chloropinae
- Genus: Pseudopachychaeta

Genus of flies

Pseudopachychaeta is a genus of grass flies in the family Chloropidae. There is at least one described species in Pseudopachychaeta, P. approximatonervis.
