= Oscinisoma =

Scientific classification
- Domain: Eukaryota
- Kingdom: Animalia
- Phylum: Arthropoda
- Class: Insecta
- Order: Diptera
- Family: Chloropidae
- Subfamily: Oscinellinae
- Genus: Oscinisoma; Lioy, 1864

Genus of flies

Oscinisoma is a genus of frit flies in the family Chloropidae. There are about eight described species in Oscinisoma.

== Species ==
These eight species belong to the genus Oscinisoma:

- Oscinisoma alienum (Becker, 1912)^{i c g b}
- Oscinisoma catharinensis (Enderlein, 1911)^{c g}
- Oscinisoma cognatum (Meigen, 1830)^{c g}
- Oscinisoma germanicum (Duda, 1932)^{c g}
- Oscinisoma gilvipes (Loew, 1858)^{c g}
- Oscinisoma longipalpus (Enderlein, 1913)^{c g}
- Oscinisoma rectum (Becker, 1911)^{c g}
- Oscinisoma ussuriense Nartshuk, 1973^{c g}

Data sources: i = ITIS, c = Catalogue of Life, g = GBIF, b = Bugguide.net
