= Platycephalisca =

Scientific classification
- Domain: Eukaryota
- Kingdom: Animalia
- Phylum: Arthropoda
- Class: Insecta
- Order: Diptera
- Family: Chloropidae
- Subfamily: Chloropinae
- Genus: Platycephalisca; Nartshuk, 1959

Genus of flies

Platycephalisca is a genus of frit flies in the family Chloropidae. There are at least three described species in Platycephalisca.

== Species ==
These three species belong to the genus Platycephalisca:

- Platycephalisca amurensis Nartshuk, 1963^{c g}
- Platycephalisca australica Spencer, 1986^{c g}
- Platycephalisca novaeguineae Ismay, 1995^{c g}

Data sources: i = ITIS, c = Catalogue of Life, g = GBIF, b = Bugguide.net
