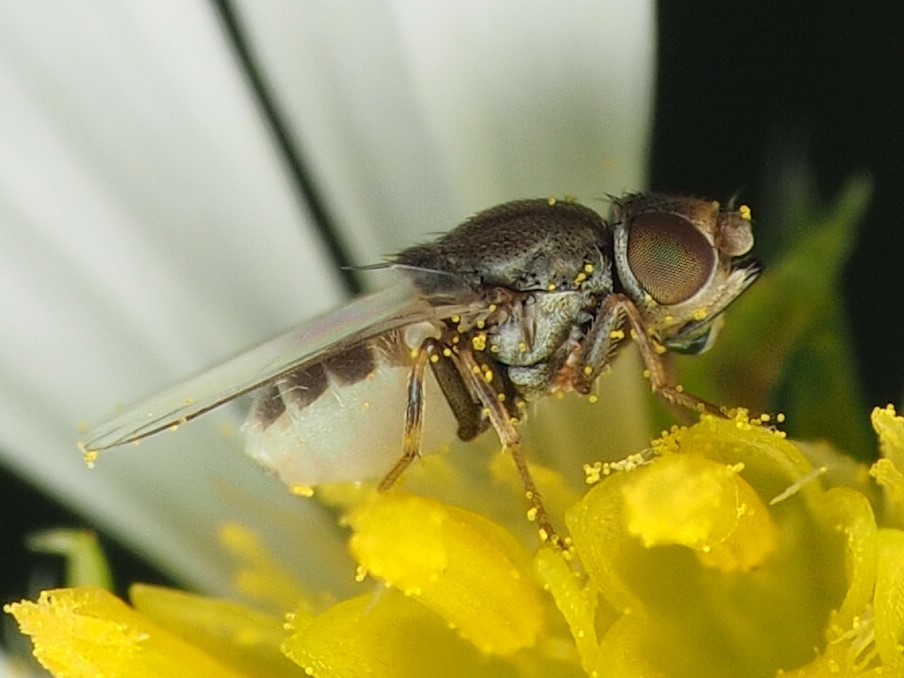

Scientific classification
- Kingdom: Animalia
- Phylum: Arthropoda
- Clade: Pancrustacea
- Class: Insecta
- Order: Diptera
- Family: Chloropidae
- Subfamily: Oscinellinae
- Genus: Olcella; Enderlein, 1911

= Olcella =

Genus of flies

Olcella is a genus of fruit flies in the family Chloropidae.

== Species ==
The following species are recognised in the genus Olcella:

- Olcella anaclasta Wheeler & Forrest, 2003
- Olcella angustibucca (Duda, 1930)
- Olcella australis (Malloch, 1934)
- Olcella cinerea (Loew, 1863)
- Olcella convexa (Malloch, 1934)
- Olcella difficilis (Becker, 1912)
- Olcella fasciata (Duda, 1930)
- Olcella finalis (Becker, 1912)
- Olcella flaviseta (Malloch, 1934)
- Olcella griseoscutellata (Duda, 1930)
- Olcella lupina Wheeler & Forrest, 2003
- Olcella mendozana Enderlein, 1911
- Olcella neotropica (Becker, 1912)
- Olcella nigriseta (Malloch, 1934)
- Olcella nigrithorax (Duda, 1930)
- Olcella obscuripila (Duda, 1929)
- Olcella opposita (Becker, 1912)
- Olcella parva (Adams, 1904)
- Olcella pleuralis (Becker, 1912)
- Olcella projecta (Malloch, 1913)
- Olcella provocans (Becker, 1912)
- Olcella punctifrons (Becker, 1912)
- Olcella pygmaea (Becker, 1912)
- Olcella quadrivittata (Sabrosky, 1935)
- Olcella scutellaris (Malloch, 1934)
- Olcella submarginalis (Sabrosky, 1935)
- Olcella trigramma (Loew, 1863)
- Olcella trilineata (Duda, 1930)
- Olcella turbata (Duda, 1930)
- BOLD:AAH4144 (Olcella sp.)
- BOLD:AAH4169 (Olcella sp.)
- BOLD:AAH4170 (Olcella sp.)
- BOLD:AAH4188 (Olcella sp.)
- BOLD:AAL7390 (Olcella sp.)
- BOLD:AAP3774 (Olcella sp.)
- BOLD:AAP5161 (Olcella sp.)
- BOLD:AAP5168 (Olcella sp.)
- BOLD:AAV6085 (Olcella sp.)
- BOLD:ABY7197 (Olcella sp.)
- BOLD:ABZ3783 (Olcella sp.)
- BOLD:ACB1547 (Olcella sp.)
- BOLD:ACG3260 (Olcella sp.)
- BOLD:ACJ1463 (Olcella sp.)
- BOLD:ACJ2144 (Olcella sp.)
- BOLD:ACL2364 (Olcella sp.)
- BOLD:ACL6983 (Olcella sp.)
- BOLD:ACM3043 (Olcella sp.)
- BOLD:ACN3846 (Olcella sp.)
- BOLD:ACO6946 (Olcella sp.)
- BOLD:ACO7645 (Olcella sp.)
- BOLD:ACU7016 (Olcella sp.)
- BOLD:ACX5000 (Olcella sp.)
- BOLD:ACY3336 (Olcella sp.)
- BOLD:ADA1854 (Olcella sp.)
- BOLD:ADN2299 (Olcella sp.)
- BOLD:ADZ7469 (Olcella sp.)
