= Camarota =

Scientific classification
- Domain: Eukaryota
- Kingdom: Animalia
- Phylum: Arthropoda
- Class: Insecta
- Order: Diptera
- Family: Chloropidae
- Subfamily: Chloropinae
- Genus: Camarota; Meigen, 1830

Genus of flies

Camarota is a genus of fly in the family Chloropidae.

== Species ==
- Camarota curvipennis (Latreille, 1805)
