= Phyladelphus =

Scientific classification
- Domain: Eukaryota
- Kingdom: Animalia
- Phylum: Arthropoda
- Class: Insecta
- Order: Diptera
- Family: Chloropidae
- Subfamily: Chloropinae
- Genus: Phyladelphus; Becker, 1910

Genus of flies

Phyladelphus is a genus of frit flies in the family Chloropidae. There are at least four described species in Phyladelphus.

== Species ==
These four species belong to the genus Phyladelphus:

- Phyladelphus cristatus Becker, 1911^{c g}
- Phyladelphus geminus Becker, 1910^{c g}
- Phyladelphus infuscatus Becker, 1916^{c g}
- Phyladelphus thalhammeri Becker, 1910^{c g}

Data sources: i = ITIS, c = Catalogue of Life, g = GBIF, b = Bugguide.net
