= Platycephala =

Scientific classification
- Kingdom: Animalia
- Phylum: Arthropoda
- Class: Insecta
- Order: Diptera
- Family: Chloropidae
- Subfamily: Chloropinae
- Genus: Platycephala; Fallén, 1820

Genus of flies

Platycephala is a genus of flies in the family Chloropidae.

== Species ==
- P. brevis An & Yang, 2008
- P. elongata An & Yang, 2008
- P. guangdongensis An & Yang, 2008
- P. guangxiensis An & Yang, 2004
- P. isinensis Kubík & Barták, 2008
- P. planifrons (Fabricius, 1798)
- P. rugosa (Nartshuk, 1964)
- P. sichuanensis Yang & Yang, 1997
- P. umbraculata (Fabricius, 1794)
- P. xui An & Yang, 2008
