= Centorisoma =

Scientific classification
- Domain: Eukaryota
- Kingdom: Animalia
- Phylum: Arthropoda
- Class: Insecta
- Order: Diptera
- Family: Chloropidae
- Subfamily: Chloropinae
- Genus: Centorisoma; Becker, 1910

Genus of flies

Centorisoma is a genus of frit flies in the family Chloropidae. There are at least 20 described species in Centorisoma.

== Species ==
These 21 species belong to the genus Centorisoma:

- Centorisoma arsenjevi Nartshuk, 1965^{c g}
- Centorisoma convexum^{g}
- Centorisoma divisum^{g}
- Centorisoma elegantulum Becker, 1910^{c g}
- Centorisoma flavum Nartshuk, 1965^{c g}
- Centorisoma helanshanensis^{g}
- Centorisoma koreanum Nartshuk, 2005^{c g}
- Centorisoma kozlovi Nartshuk, 1965^{c g}
- Centorisoma kyushuense Kanmiya, 1983^{c g}
- Centorisoma mediconvexum^{g}
- Centorisoma mongolicum Nartshuk, 1968^{c g}
- Centorisoma neimengguensis^{g}
- Centorisoma nigriaristatum Yang & Yang, 1992^{c g}
- Centorisoma nishijimai Kanmiya, 1983^{c g}
- Centorisoma obscuripenne Nartshuk, 1965^{c g}
- Centorisoma pentagonium^{g}
- Centorisoma scutatum^{g}
- Centorisoma sexangulatum^{g}
- Centorisoma shaanxiensis^{g}
- Centorisoma subdivitis Nartshuk, 2006^{c g}
- Centorisoma ussuriense Nartshuk, 1965^{c g}

Data sources: i = ITIS, c = Catalogue of Life, g = GBIF, b = Bugguide.net
