= Lagaroceras =

Scientific classification
- Kingdom: Animalia
- Phylum: Arthropoda
- Class: Insecta
- Order: Diptera
- Family: Chloropidae
- Subfamily: Chloropinae
- Genus: Lagaroceras; Becker, 1903

Genus of flies

Lagaroceras is a genus of fruit flies in the family Chloropidae. There are about 19 described species in Lagaroceras.

== Species ==
These 19 species belong to the genus Lagaroceras:

- Lagaroceras annulatum Deeming, 1981^{c g}
- Lagaroceras anomalum Lamb, 1917^{c g}
- Lagaroceras australis Deeming, 1981^{c g}
- Lagaroceras cogani Deeming, 1981^{c g}
- Lagaroceras curtum Sabrosky, 1961^{c g}
- Lagaroceras deceptivum Spencer, 1986^{c g}
- Lagaroceras distinctum Deeming, 1981^{c g}
- Lagaroceras infuscatum Lamb, 1917^{c g}
- Lagaroceras longicorne (Thomson, 1869)^{c g}
- Lagaroceras megalops Becker, 1903^{c g}
- Lagaroceras nigra Yang & Yang, 1995^{c g}
- Lagaroceras nigroscutellatum Deeming, 1981^{c g}
- Lagaroceras opaculum Becker, 1910^{c g}
- Lagaroceras princeps (Becker, 1910)^{c g}
- Lagaroceras pulchellum Lamb, 1917^{c g}
- Lagaroceras queenslandicum Spencer, 1986^{c g}
- Lagaroceras septentrionalis Spencer, 1986^{c g}
- Lagaroceras sequens Becker, 1910^{c g}
- Lagaroceras tenuicorne Malloch, 1927^{c g}

Data sources: i = ITIS, c = Catalogue of Life, g = GBIF, b = Bugguide.net
