= Gaurax =

Scientific classification
- Kingdom: Animalia
- Phylum: Arthropoda
- Class: Insecta
- Order: Diptera
- Family: Chloropidae
- Subfamily: Oscinellinae
- Genus: Gaurax; Loew, 1863

Genus of flies

Gaurax is a genus of flies in the family Chloropidae.

== Species ==
- G. apicalis Malloch, 1915
- G. atrilinea Sabrosky, 1951
- G. atripalpus Sabrosky, 1951
- G. basitarsalis Sabrosky, 1951
- G. borealis (Duda, 1933)
- G. britannicus Deeming, 1980
- G. dorsalis (Loew, 1863)
- G. dubia (Macquart, 1835)
- G. dubius (Macquart, 1835)
- G. ephippium (Zetterstedt, 1848)
- G. fascipes Becker, 1910
- G. festivus Loew, 863
- G. flavomaculatus (Duda, 1933)
- G. flavoscutellatus (Stackelberg, 1955)
- G. fumipennis (Malloch, 1915)
- G. gauracicornis (Duda, 1933)
- G. leucarista Nartshuk, 1962
- G. macrocerus (Nartshuk, 1962)
- G. maculicornis Sabrosky, 1951
- G. maculipennis (Zetterstedt, 1848)
- G. maculipes Sabrosky, 1951
- G. melanotum Sabrosky, 1951
- G. mesopedalis Sabrosky, 1951
- G. montanus Coquillett, 898
- G. niger Czerny, 1906
- G. obscuripennis Johnson, 1913
- G. ocellaris Sabrosky, 1951
- G. pallidipes Malloch, 1915
- G. patelainae Peterson, 1967
- G. pilosula (Becker, 1912)
- G. polonicus Nartshuk, 1980
- G. pseudostigma Johnson, 1913
- G. semivittatus Sabrosky, 1951
- G. shannoni Sabrosky, 1951
- G. splendidus Malloch, 1915
- G. strobilum Karps, 1983
- G. tripus Sabrosky, 1951
- G. varihalterata (Malloch, 1913)
- G. vittipes Sabrosky, 1951
