= Trichieurina =

Scientific classification
- Kingdom: Animalia
- Phylum: Arthropoda
- Class: Insecta
- Order: Diptera
- Family: Chloropidae
- Subfamily: Chloropinae
- Genus: Trichieurina; Duda, 1933

Genus of flies

Trichieurina is a genus of flies in the family Chloropidae.

== Species ==
- T. pubescens (Meigen, 1830)
