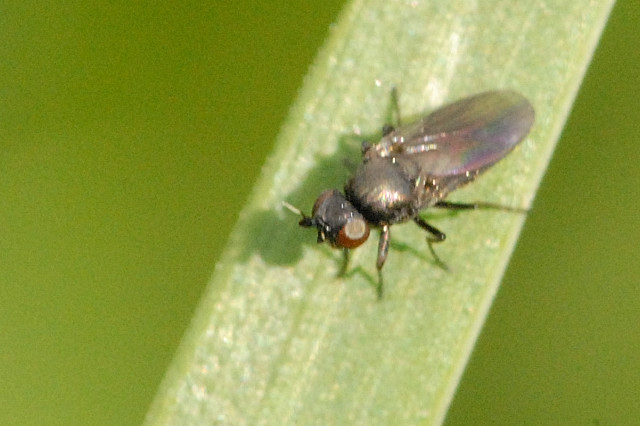

Scientific classification
- Kingdom: Animalia
- Phylum: Arthropoda
- Clade: Pancrustacea
- Class: Insecta
- Order: Diptera
- Family: Chloropidae
- Genus: Oscinella
- Species: O. frit

Binomial name
- Oscinella frit (Linnaeus, 1758)

Synonyms
- Musca frit Linnaeus, 1758; Oscinella exigua Collin, 1946; Oscinella granaria (Curtis, 1846); Oscinis granaria Curtis, 1846

= Oscinella frit =

Species of fly

Oscinella frit is a European species of fly and member of the family Chloropidae. Oscinella frit is an agricultural pest causing damage to crops by boring into the shoots of oats, wheat, maize, barley and grasses.
