= Afrocelyphus =

Scientific classification
- Kingdom: Animalia
- Phylum: Arthropoda
- Class: Insecta
- Order: Diptera
- Family: Chloropidae
- Genus: Afrocelyphus; Vanschuytbroeck, 1959

Type species
- Afrocelyphus saegeri Vanschuytbroeck, 1959

Genus of flies

Afrocelyphus is a genus of Chloropidae, the genus was originally placed in the family Celyphidae.

== Species ==
- Afrocelyphus saegeri Malloch, 1929
