= Lasiosina =

- Lasiosina sp.

Scientific classification
- Kingdom: Animalia
- Phylum: Arthropoda
- Class: Insecta
- Order: Diptera
- Family: Chloropidae
- Subfamily: Chloropinae
- Genus: Lasiosina; Becker, 1910

Genus of flies

Lasiosina is a genus of flies in the family Chloropidae.
