= Hippelates nobilis =

Scientific classification
- Domain: Eukaryota
- Kingdom: Animalia
- Phylum: Arthropoda
- Class: Insecta
- Order: Diptera
- Family: Chloropidae
- Genus: Hippelates
- Species: H. nobilis

Binomial name
- Hippelates nobilis Loew, 1863

Species of fly

Hippelates nobilis is a species of frit fly in the family Chloropidae.
