= Epichlorops =

Scientific classification
- Domain: Eukaryota
- Kingdom: Animalia
- Phylum: Arthropoda
- Class: Insecta
- Order: Diptera
- Family: Chloropidae
- Subfamily: Chloropinae
- Genus: Epichlorops; Becker, 1910

Genus of flies

Epichlorops is a genus of grass flies in the family Chloropidae. There are at least 5 described species in Epichlorops.

== Species ==
- Epichlorops elongatus Wheeler, 1994
- Epichlorops exilis (Coquillett, 1898)
- Epichlorops puncticollis (Zetterstedt, 1848)
- Epichlorops scaber (Coquillett, 1898)
- Epichlorops yunnaneni Cui & Ding, 2009
