= Chloropsina =

Scientific classification
- Domain: Eukaryota
- Kingdom: Animalia
- Phylum: Arthropoda
- Class: Insecta
- Order: Diptera
- Family: Chloropidae
- Subfamily: Chloropinae
- Genus: Chloropsina; Becker, 1911

Synonyms
- Globiops Andersson, 1977

Genus of flies

Chloropsina is a genus of flies in the family Chloropidae.

== Species ==
- Chloropsina acuticornis Deeming, 1981
- Chloropsina affulgens Deeming, 1981
- Chloropsina amabile (Frey, 1923)
- Chloropsina ambigua (Frey, 1923)
- Chloropsina angolensis Deeming, 1981
- Chloropsina angustigenis (Becker, 1912)
- Chloropsina ater (Duda, 1934)
- Chloropsina bipunctifrons (Meijere, 1913)
- Chloropsina brunnescens (Andersson, 1977)
- Chloropsina citrivora Sabrosky, 1976
- Chloropsina coelestifrons (Frey, 1923)
- Chloropsina collessi Spencer, 1986
- Chloropsina completa (Becker, 1913)
- Chloropsina costale (Malloch, 1931)
- Chloropsina crassipalpis Deeming, 1981
- Chloropsina deemingi Ismay, 1996
- Chloropsina delicata Becker, 1911
- Chloropsina difficilis (Malloch, 1931)
- Chloropsina distinguenda (Frey, 1909)
- Chloropsina distinguendus (Frey, 1909)
- Chloropsina elegans (Bezzi, 1914)
- Chloropsina enigma Deeming & Al-Dhafer, 2012
- Chloropsina flavovaria Becker, 1916
- Chloropsina gingerensis Spencer, 1986
- Chloropsina gugae Deeming, 1981
- Chloropsina ilaroensis Deeming, 1981
- Chloropsina koongarrensis Spencer, 1986
- Chloropsina kurilensis (Nartshuk, 1973)
- Chloropsina lacreiventris (Lamb, 1917)
- Chloropsina leucochaeta Meijere, 1913
- Chloropsina litoralis Deeming, 1981
- Chloropsina lucens (Becker, 1910)
- Chloropsina mallochi (Sabrosky, 1955)
- Chloropsina mambillaensis Deeming, 1981
- Chloropsina medleri Deeming, 1981
- Chloropsina minima Becker, 1911
- Chloropsina minus (Malloch, 1931)
- Chloropsina nigerrima (Becker, 1913)
- Chloropsina nigricollis (Frey, 1923)
- Chloropsina nitens (Lamb, 1917)
- Chloropsina nuda (Becker, 1913)
- Chloropsina obscura Spencer, 1986
- Chloropsina ochrifrons Deeming, 1981
- Chloropsina oculata Becker, 1911
- Chloropsina pallipes Spencer, 1986
- Chloropsina poecilogaster (Becker, 1913)
- Chloropsina polita Becker, 1911
- Chloropsina pulicaria Ismay, 1999
- Chloropsina punctifacialis Deeming, 1981
- Chloropsina queenslandensis Spencer, 1986
- Chloropsina rhombata (Kanmiya, 1978)
- Chloropsina rohaceki Nartshuk, 2000
- Chloropsina ruandana Deeming, 1981
- Chloropsina rubrostriata (Duda, 1934)
- Chloropsina simile (Malloch, 1931)
- Chloropsina stubbsi Deeming, 1981
- Chloropsina sulcicornis Deeming, 1981
- Chloropsina sumatrana (Duda, 1934)
- Chloropsina sydneyensis (Malloch, 1938)
- Chloropsina sylvatica Deeming, 1981
- Chloropsina tagalica (Frey, 1923)
- Chloropsina tatabua Deeming, 1981
- Chloropsina tibiale (Malloch, 1931)
- Chloropsina triangularis (Malloch, 1931)
- Chloropsina turneri Spencer, 1986
- Chloropsina varia (Becker, 1913)
- Chloropsina varley (Ismay, 1999)
- Chloropsina varleyi Ismay, 1999
- Chloropsina vesicata Deeming, 1981

Names brought to synonymy

- Chloropsina nigrohalteratum, synonym of Melanum nigrohalteratum
