= Parectecephala =

Scientific classification
- Kingdom: Animalia
- Phylum: Arthropoda
- Class: Insecta
- Order: Diptera
- Family: Chloropidae
- Subfamily: Chloropinae
- Genus: Parectecephala; Becker, 1910

Genus of flies

Parectecephala is a genus of grass flies in the family Chloropidae. There are about 6 described species in Parectecephala.

== Species ==
- Parectecephala aristalis (Coquillett, 1898)
- Parectecephala dissimilis (Malloch, 1914)
- Parectecephala eucera (Loew, 1863)
- Parectecephala maculiceps Becker, 1912
- Parectecephala maculosa (Loew, 1872)
- Parectecephala sanguinolenta (Loew, 1863)
