= Melanum =

Scientific classification
- Kingdom: Animalia
- Phylum: Arthropoda
- Clade: Pancrustacea
- Class: Insecta
- Order: Diptera
- Family: Chloropidae
- Subfamily: Chloropinae
- Genus: Melanum; Becker, 1910

Genus of flies

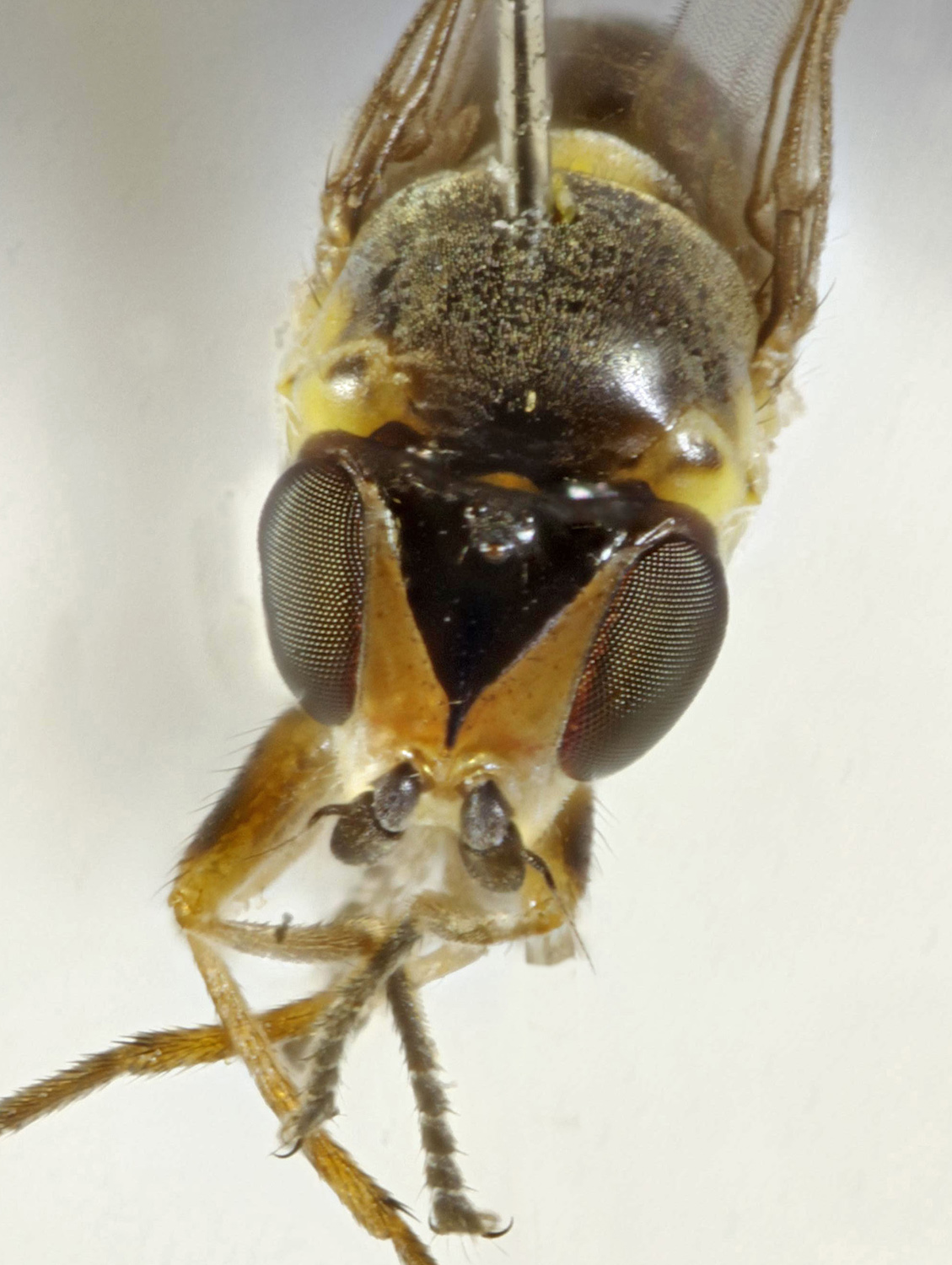
Melanum laterale

Melanum is a genus of flies in the family Chloropidae.
