= Apotropina =

Scientific classification
- Kingdom: Animalia
- Phylum: Arthropoda
- Class: Insecta
- Order: Diptera
- Family: Chloropidae
- Subfamily: Siphonellopsinae
- Genus: Apotropina; Hendel, 1907

Synonyms
- Ectropa Schiner, 1868; Lasiopleura Becker, 1910; Parahippelates Becker, 1911; Emmalochaeta Becker, 1916; Ephydroscinis Malloch, 1924; Terraereginia Malloch, 1928; Hopkinsella Malloch, 1930; Omochaeta Duda, 1930; Neoborborus Rayment, 1931; Terraeregina Neave, 1940; Oscinelloides Malloch, 1940; Protohippelates Andersson, 1977

Genus of flies

Apotropina is a genus of fruit flies in the family Chloropidae.

== Species ==
- Apotropina aequalis (Becker, 1911)
- Apotropina albiseta (Malloch, 1924)
- Apotropina anomala (Malloch, 1925)
- Apotropina australis (Malloch, 1924)
- Apotropina barberi (Sabrosky, 1951)
- Apotropina bispinosa (Becker, 1911)
- Apotropina bistriata Liu & Yang, 2015
- Apotropina brevivenosa (Dely-Draskovits, 1977)
- Apotropina brunneicosta (Malloch, 1923)
- Apotropina brunneivittata Sabrosky, 1982
- Apotropina brunnipennis (Meijere, 1913)
- Apotropina cinerea (Meijere, 1906)
- Apotropina circumdata (Duda, 1930)
- Apotropina coenosioides (Frey, 1923)
- Apotropina conopsea (Duda, 1934)
- Apotropina costomaculata (Malloch, 1924)
- Apotropina dasypleura (Malloch, 1928)
- Apotropina duplicata (Malloch, 1923)
- Apotropina exquisita (Malloch, 1940)
- Apotropina fortis (Becker, 1916)
- Apotropina fuscipleuris (Becker, 1911)
- Apotropina gigantea (Becker, 1916)
- Apotropina gracilis (Malloch, 1913)
- Apotropina grisea (Malloch, 1934)
- Apotropina griseovina (Malloch, 1936)
- Apotropina hirtiventris (Malloch, 1934)
- Apotropina hirtoides (Sabrosky, 1951)
- Apotropina infumata (Becker, 1916)
- Apotropina itascae (Sabrosky, 1951)
- Apotropina japonica Kanmiya, 1983
- Apotropina lachaisei Sabrosky, 1982
- Apotropina lineata (Becker, 1916)
- Apotropina longepilosa (Strobl, 1893)
- Apotropina longipennis (Becker, 1912)
- Apotropina longiprocessa Liu & Yang, 2015
- Apotropina longula (Becker, 1912)
- Apotropina lutea (Meijere, 1906)
- Apotropina meijerei (Sabrosky, 1952)
- Apotropina nagatomii Yang, Yang & Kanmiya, 1993
- Apotropina nigricornis (Duda, 1930)
- Apotropina nigricornis Sabrosky, 1982
- Apotropina nigripila (Duda, 1934)
- Apotropina nudiseta (Becker, 1911)
- Apotropina ornatipennis (Malloch, 1923)
- Apotropina palliata (Curran, 1926)
- Apotropina pallipes (Malloch, 1940)
- Apotropina panamensis (Malloch, 1934)
- Apotropina parva (Malloch, 1928)
- Apotropina proxima (Rayment, 1959)
- Apotropina pruinosa (Thomson, 1869)
- Apotropina pulchrifrons (Meijere, 1906)
- Apotropina purpurascens (Malloch, 1930)
- Apotropina quadriseta (Harrison, 1959)
- Apotropina raymenti (Curran, 1930)
- Apotropina rufescens (Duda, 1934)
- Apotropina rufithorax (Duda, 1930)
- Apotropina senilis (Duda, 1930)
- Apotropina shewelli (Sabrosky, 1951)
- Apotropina shewelliana (Spencer, 1977)
- Apotropina sigalopleura Sabrosky, 1982
- Apotropina sinensis Yang, Yang & Kanmiya, 1993
- Apotropina speculariforns (Enderlein, 1911)
- Apotropina stuckenbergi Sabrosky, 1982
- Apotropina sulae (Spencer, 1977)
- Apotropina taylori (Malloch, 1940)
- Apotropina tomentosa Cherian, 2002
- Apotropina tonnoiri (Sabrosky, 1955)
- Apotropina tristriata Liu & Yang, 2015
- Apotropina tsitsikama Sabrosky, 1982
- Apotropina uniformis Yang, Yang & Kanmiya, 1993
- Apotropina viduata (Schiner, 1868)
- Apotropina virilis (Bohart & Gressitt, 1951)
- Apotropina vittata (Sabrosky, 1959)
- Apotropina willistoni (Sabrosky, 1951)
- Apotropina wisei (Harrison, 1959)
- Apotropina zeylanica (Lamb, 1918)
