= Elachiptereicus =

Scientific classification
- Domain: Eukaryota
- Kingdom: Animalia
- Phylum: Arthropoda
- Class: Insecta
- Order: Diptera
- Family: Chloropidae
- Subfamily: Chloropinae
- Genus: Elachiptereicus; Becker, 1909

Genus of flies

Elachiptereicus is a genus of fruit flies in the family Chloropidae. There are about seven described species in Elachiptereicus.

== Species ==
These seven species belong to the genus Elachiptereicus:

- Elachiptereicus abessynicus Becker, 1913^{c g}
- Elachiptereicus angustigena Sabrosky, 1951^{c g}
- Elachiptereicus australiensis Ismay, 1996^{c g}
- Elachiptereicus bistriatus Becker, 1909^{c g}
- Elachiptereicus dorsocentralis Becker, 1911^{g}
- Elachiptereicus italicus Duda, 1933^{c g}
- Elachiptereicus japonicus Kanmiya, 1987^{c g}

Data sources: i = ITIS, c = Catalogue of Life, g = GBIF, b = Bugguide.net
