= Conioscinella =

Scientific classification
- Domain: Eukaryota
- Kingdom: Animalia
- Phylum: Arthropoda
- Class: Insecta
- Order: Diptera
- Family: Chloropidae
- Subfamily: Oscinellinae
- Genus: Conioscinella; Duda, 1929

Genus of flies

Conioscinella is a genus of fly in the family Chloropidae.

== Species list ==
- C. aequisecta
- C. alpicola
- C. alpigena
- C. amabilis
- C. angulicornis
- C. annulifemur
- C. apicalis
- C. apiomorphae
- C. aptera
- C. apterina
- C. araeceri
- C. araneolicida
- C. argentinica
- C. atritibia
- C. badia
- C. beckeri
- C. bicingulata
- C. bistriata
- C. chathamensis
- C. chilenica
- C. collucens
- C. confluens
- C. cricopus
- C. curvinervis
- C. deficiens
- C. dimidiata
- C. dissimilicornis
- C. divitis
- C. elegans
- C. emmesia
- C. empheria
- C. eucalypti
- C. flavescens
- C. flavifrons
- C. flaviscutellata
- C. flaviseta
- C. flavotrigona
- C. formosa
- C. frontella
- C. fulvithorax
- C. fuscofrontata
- C. gallarum
- C. galpagensis
- C. grandis
- C. griseicollis
- C. grisella
- C. griseopleura
- C. griseostriata
- C. grisescens
- C. halophila
- C. hinkleyi
- C. hirsuta
- C. humeralis
- C. improvisa
- C. incipiens
- C. inconspicua
- C. inconstans
- C. intrita
- C. iota
- C. kaszabi
- C. koeleriae
- C. lacteihalterata
- C. livida
- C. longipennis
- C. lutea
- C. mackerrasi
- C. maculata
- C. maculipennis
- C. makoa
- C. mars
- C. mongolica
- C. neorobusta
- C. nidicola
- C. nigrifrons
- C. nigripes
- C. nigritarsalis
- C. nigrohalterata
- C. nuda
- C. obscuripila
- C. ochracea
- C. opacifrons
- C. orientalis
- C. pallidinervis
- C. pallidipes
- C. pallidiseta
- C. perdita
- C. perlineata
- C. persita
- C. poecilogaster
- C. pseudogauracica
- C. pulverulenta
- C. pumilio
- C. punctulata
- C. pusio
- C. quadrivittata
- C. radicalis
- C. rigidiseta
- C. rudebecki
- C. rufithorax
- C. rufoscutellata
- C. sancheong
- C. sauteri
- C. seguyi
- C. semicirularis
- C. similans
- C. soluta
- C. sordidella
- C. speighti
- C. spenceri
- C. sublineata
- C. subnitens
- C. subsetosa
- C. taeniata
- C. tenuiseta
- C. triorbiculata
- C. tripunctata
- C. turbida
- C. umbripennis
- C. uniseriata
- C. vandiemeni
- C. vestita
- C. xyloryctae
- C. zetterstedti
- C. zuercheri
