= Assuania =

Scientific classification
- Kingdom: Animalia
- Phylum: Arthropoda
- Class: Insecta
- Order: Diptera
- Family: Chloropidae
- Subfamily: Chloropinae
- Genus: Assuania; Becker, 1903

Genus of flies

Assuania is a genus of fruit flies in the family Chloropidae.

There are about six described species in Assuania:

- Assuania glabricollis (Becker, 1910)
- Assuania nigricollis (Becker, 1913)
- Assuania scutellaris (Adams, 1905)
- Assuania sudanensis (Becker, 1922)
- Assuania sulcifrons (Bezzi, 1908)
- Assuania thalhammeri (Strobl, 1893)
