= Chaetochlorops =

Scientific classification
- Domain: Eukaryota
- Kingdom: Animalia
- Phylum: Arthropoda
- Class: Insecta
- Order: Diptera
- Family: Chloropidae
- Subfamily: Oscinellinae
- Genus: Chaetochlorops; Malloch, 1914

Genus of flies

Chaetochlorops is a genus of frit flies in the family Chloropidae. There are at least three described species in Chaetochlorops.

== Species ==
These three species belong to the genus Chaetochlorops:

- Chaetochlorops inquilinus (Coquillett, 1898)^{i c g b}
- Chaetochlorops scutellaris (Becker, 1916)^{c g}
- Chaetochlorops tanyaspis Hibbert & Wheeler, 2007^{c g}

Data sources: i = ITIS, c = Catalogue of Life, g = GBIF, b = Bugguide.net
