= Homalura =

Scientific classification
- Domain: Eukaryota
- Kingdom: Animalia
- Phylum: Arthropoda
- Class: Insecta
- Order: Diptera
- Family: Chloropidae
- Subfamily: Chloropinae
- Genus: Homalura; Meigen, 1826

Genus of flies

Homalura is a genus of frit flies in the family Chloropidae. There are about six described species in Homalura.

== Species ==
These six species belong to the genus Homalura:

- Homalura atra Nartshuk, 1968^{c g}
- Homalura disciventris (Enderlein, 1911)^{c g}
- Homalura dumonti Seguy, 1934^{c g}
- Homalura flava Brulle, 1833^{g}
- Homalura sarudnyi Becker, 1910^{c g}
- Homalura tarsata Meigen, 1826^{c g}

Data sources: i = ITIS, c = Catalogue of Life, g = GBIF, b = Bugguide.net
