= Metopostigma =

Scientific classification
- Domain: Eukaryota
- Kingdom: Animalia
- Phylum: Arthropoda
- Class: Insecta
- Order: Diptera
- Family: Chloropidae
- Subfamily: Chloropinae
- Genus: Metopostigma; Becker, 1903

Genus of flies

Metopostigma is a genus of frit flies in the family Chloropidae. There are about nine described species in Metopostigma.

== Species ==
These nine species belong to the genus Metopostigma:

- Metopostigma japonicum Kanmiya, 1978^{c g}
- Metopostigma limbipenne Meijere, 1913^{c g}
- Metopostigma nigriantennatum Kanmiya, 1978^{c g}
- Metopostigma nigritriangulum Kanmiya, 1978^{c g}
- Metopostigma pleskei Becker, 1910^{c g}
- Metopostigma polonicum (Schnabl, 1884)^{c g}
- Metopostigma sabulona Becker, 1910^{c g}
- Metopostigma sauteri Becker, 1911^{c g}
- Metopostigma tenuiseta (Loew, 1860)^{c g}

Data sources: i = ITIS, c = Catalogue of Life, g = GBIF, b = Bugguide.net
