= Elliponeura =

Scientific classification
- Domain: Eukaryota
- Kingdom: Animalia
- Phylum: Arthropoda
- Class: Insecta
- Order: Diptera
- Family: Chloropidae
- Subfamily: Chloropinae
- Genus: Elliponeura; Loew, 1869

Genus of flies

Elliponeura is a genus of grass flies in the family Chloropidae. There is at least one described species in Elliponeura, E. debilis.
