= Pseudogaurax =

Scientific classification
- Domain: Eukaryota
- Kingdom: Animalia
- Phylum: Arthropoda
- Class: Insecta
- Order: Diptera
- Family: Chloropidae
- Subfamily: Oscinellinae
- Genus: Pseudogaurax; Malloch, 1915

Synonyms
- Pseudogaurax Duda, 1930; Mimogaurax Hall, 1937

Genus of flies

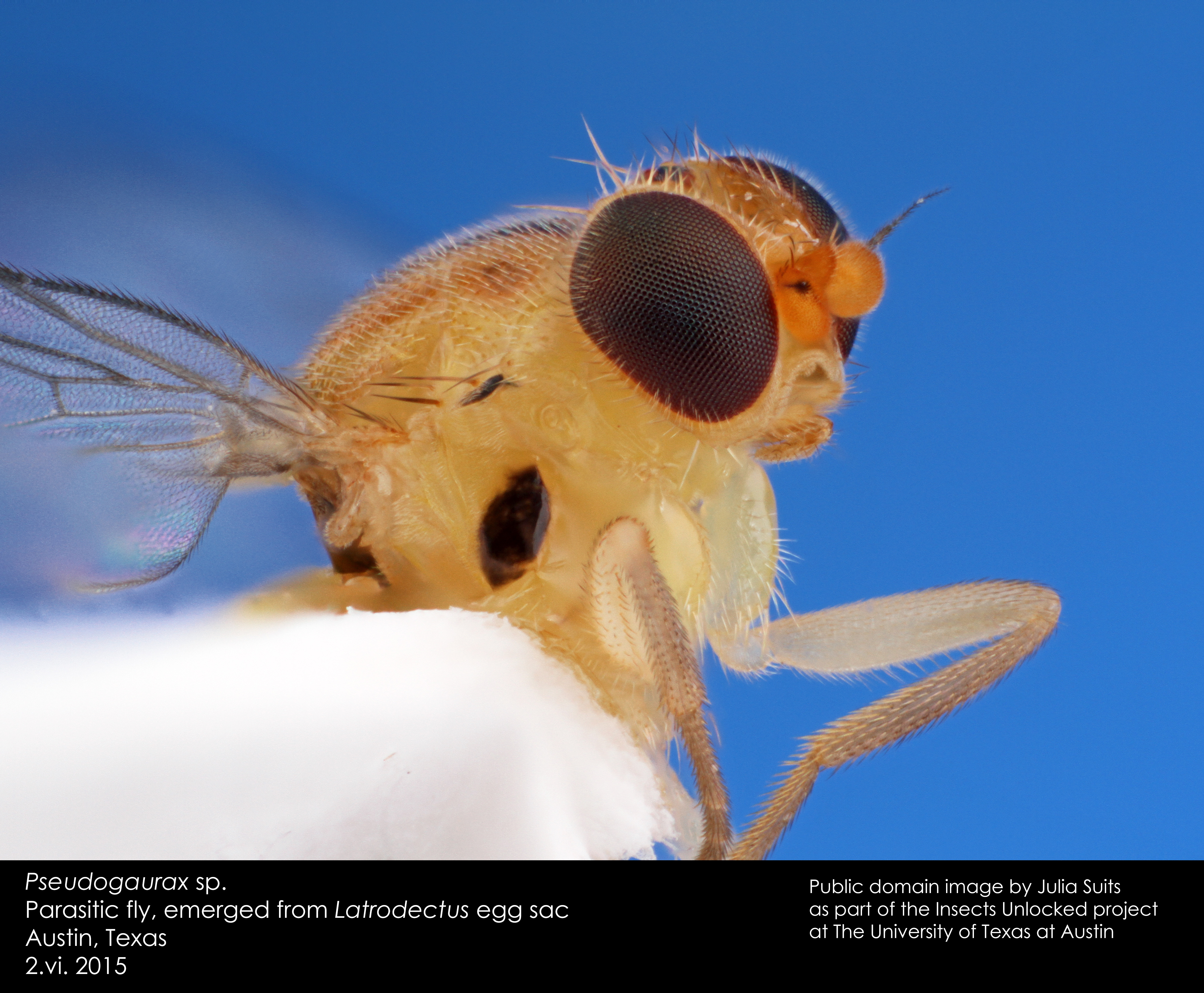
Pseudogorax

Pseudogaurax is a genus of parasitic chloropid flies in the family Chloropidae. There are at least 4 described species in Pseudogaurax.

== Species ==
- Pseudogaurax anchora (Loew, 1866)
- Pseudogaurax floridensis Sabrosky, 1950
- Pseudogaurax paratolmos (Wheeler, 2016)
- Pseudogaurax signatus (Loew, 1876)
