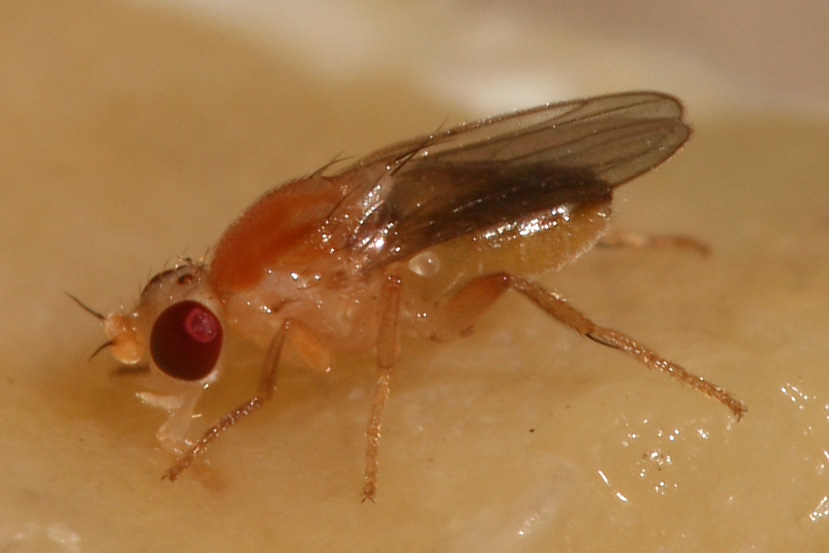
- An Eye gnat, a small 1-2mm long fly. Image is a crop of a 1:1 magnification. Pictured in Dar es Salaam, Tanzania on a piece of fish.

Scientific classification
- Kingdom: Animalia
- Phylum: Arthropoda
- Class: Insecta
- Order: Diptera
- Family: Chloropidae
- Subfamily: Oscinellinae
- Genus: Tricimba; Lioy, 1864

= Hippelates =

Genus of flies

Hippelates is a genus of flies in the family Chloropidae that are often referred to as eye gnats or eye flies (the name is also used for members of the Old World genus Siphunculina).

== Description ==
They are very small (1.5–2.5 millimetres or 0.06–0.10 inches long) flies that frequently congregate around the eyes to lap at the fluids. They are primarily a nuisance pest, and do not bite. They have been linked with the spread of bovine mastitis in North America, and in certain tropical regions, they are capable of vectoring disease-causing bacteria (e.g., yaws).

Hippelates pusio is considered to be the vector for anaplasmosis, bovine mastitis, and Haemophilus spp. which cause bacterial conjunctivitis or 'pinkeye'.

== Distribution ==
Hippelates are Neotropical and Nearctic in distribution.

== Species ==
- Hippelates bishoppi
- Hippelates dorsalis Loew, 1869
- Hippelates genalis Loew, 1869
- Hippelates impressus Becker, 1912
- Hippelates nobilis Loew, 1863
- Hippelates pallipes Loew, 1863
- Hippelates plebejus Loew, 1863
- Hippelates proboscideus Williston, 1896
- Hippelates pusio Loew
- Hippelates saundersi Kumm, 1936
