= Malloewia =

Scientific classification
- Kingdom: Animalia
- Phylum: Arthropoda
- Class: Insecta
- Order: Diptera
- Family: Chloropidae
- Subfamily: Oscinellinae
- Genus: Malloewia

Genus of flies

Malloewia is a genus of frit flies in the family Chloropidae. There are about 8 described species in Malloewia.

== Species ==
- Malloewia abdominalis (Becker, 1912)
- Malloewia aequa (Becker, 1912)
- Malloewia diabolus (Becker, 1912)
- Malloewia excipiens (Becker, 1912)
- Malloewia extrema (Becker, 1912)
- Malloewia neglecta (Becker, 1912)
- Malloewia nigripalpis (Malloch, 1913)
- Malloewia setulosa (Malloch, 1918)
