= Eurina =

Scientific classification
- Domain: Eukaryota
- Kingdom: Animalia
- Phylum: Arthropoda
- Class: Insecta
- Order: Diptera
- Family: Chloropidae
- Subfamily: Chloropinae
- Genus: Eurina; Meigen, 1830

Genus of flies

Eurina is a genus of flies in the family Chloropidae.
