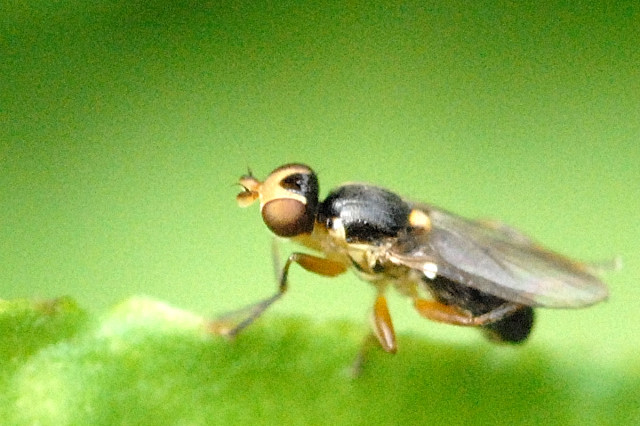
- possibly Cetema cereris

Scientific classification
- Kingdom: Animalia
- Phylum: Arthropoda
- Class: Insecta
- Order: Diptera
- Family: Chloropidae
- Subfamily: Chloropinae
- Genus: Cetema; Hendel, 1907

= Cetema =

Genus of flies

Cetema is a genus of flies in the family Chloropidae.
