= Stenoscinis =

Scientific classification
- Kingdom: Animalia
- Phylum: Arthropoda
- Class: Insecta
- Order: Diptera
- Family: Chloropidae
- Subfamily: Oscinellinae
- Genus: Stenoscinis

Genus of flies

Stenoscinis is a genus of frit flies in the family Chloropidae. There are at least 2 described species in Stenoscinis.

== Species ==
- Stenoscinis adachiae Sabrosky, 1961
- Stenoscinis longipes (Loew, 1863)
