= Homaluroides =

Scientific classification
- Kingdom: Animalia
- Phylum: Arthropoda
- Class: Insecta
- Order: Diptera
- Family: Chloropidae
- Subfamily: Chloropinae
- Genus: Homaluroides

Genus of flies

Homaluroides is a genus of grass flies in the family Chloropidae. There are about 9 described species in Homaluroides.

== Species ==
- Homaluroides abdominalis (Coquillett, 1895)
- Homaluroides distichliae (Malloch, 1918)
- Homaluroides gramineus (Coquillett, 1898)
- Homaluroides ingratus (Williston, 1893)
- Homaluroides melleus (Loew, 1872)
- Homaluroides mexicanus (Duda, 1930)
- Homaluroides pilosulus (Becker, 1912)
- Homaluroides quinquepunctatus (Loew, 1863)
- Homaluroides surdus (Curran, 1930)
