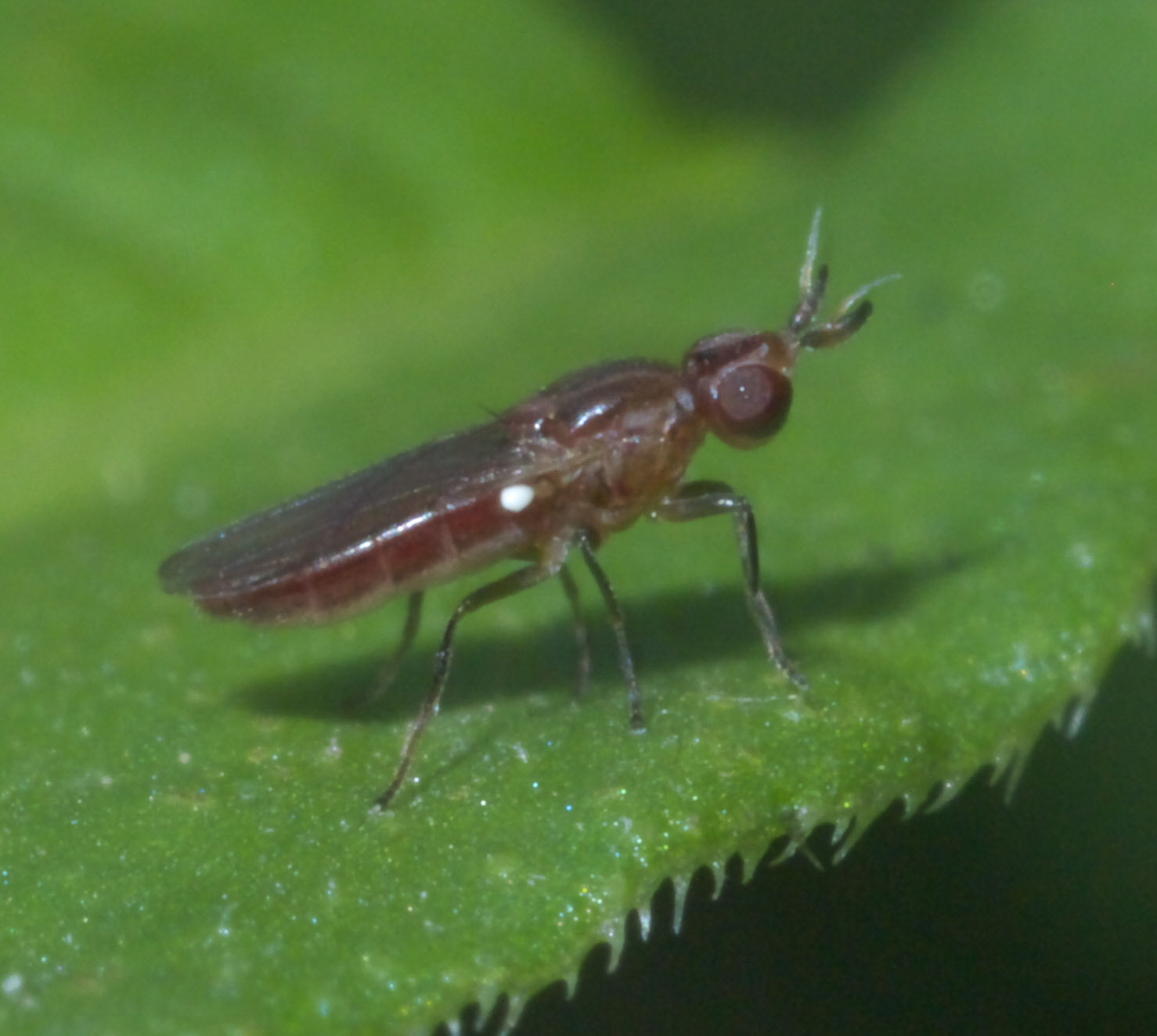
- Ectecephala albistylum

Scientific classification
- Domain: Eukaryota
- Kingdom: Animalia
- Phylum: Arthropoda
- Class: Insecta
- Order: Diptera
- Family: Chloropidae
- Subfamily: Chloropinae
- Genus: Ectecephala; Macquart, 1851

Type species
- Ectecephala albistylum Macquart, 1851

= Ectecephala =

Genus of flies

Ectecephala is a genus of grass flies in the family Chloropidae. There are about 6 described species in Ectecephala.

== Species ==
- Ectecephala albistylum Macquart, 1851
- Ectecephala laticornis Coquillett, 1910
- Ectecephala obscura (Schiner, 1868)
- Ectecephala sulcata Sabrosky, 1941
- Ectecephala sulcifrons Coquillett, 1910
- Ectecephala unicolor (Loew, 1863)
