= Dysartia =

Scientific classification
- Kingdom: Animalia
- Phylum: Arthropoda
- Class: Insecta
- Order: Diptera
- Family: Chloropidae
- Genus: Dysartia; Sabrosky 1991

Genus of flies

Dysartia is a genus of fly in the family Chloropidae. they are known to be predaceous on grasshopper eggs.

== Species ==
- D. latigena Sabrosky 1991
