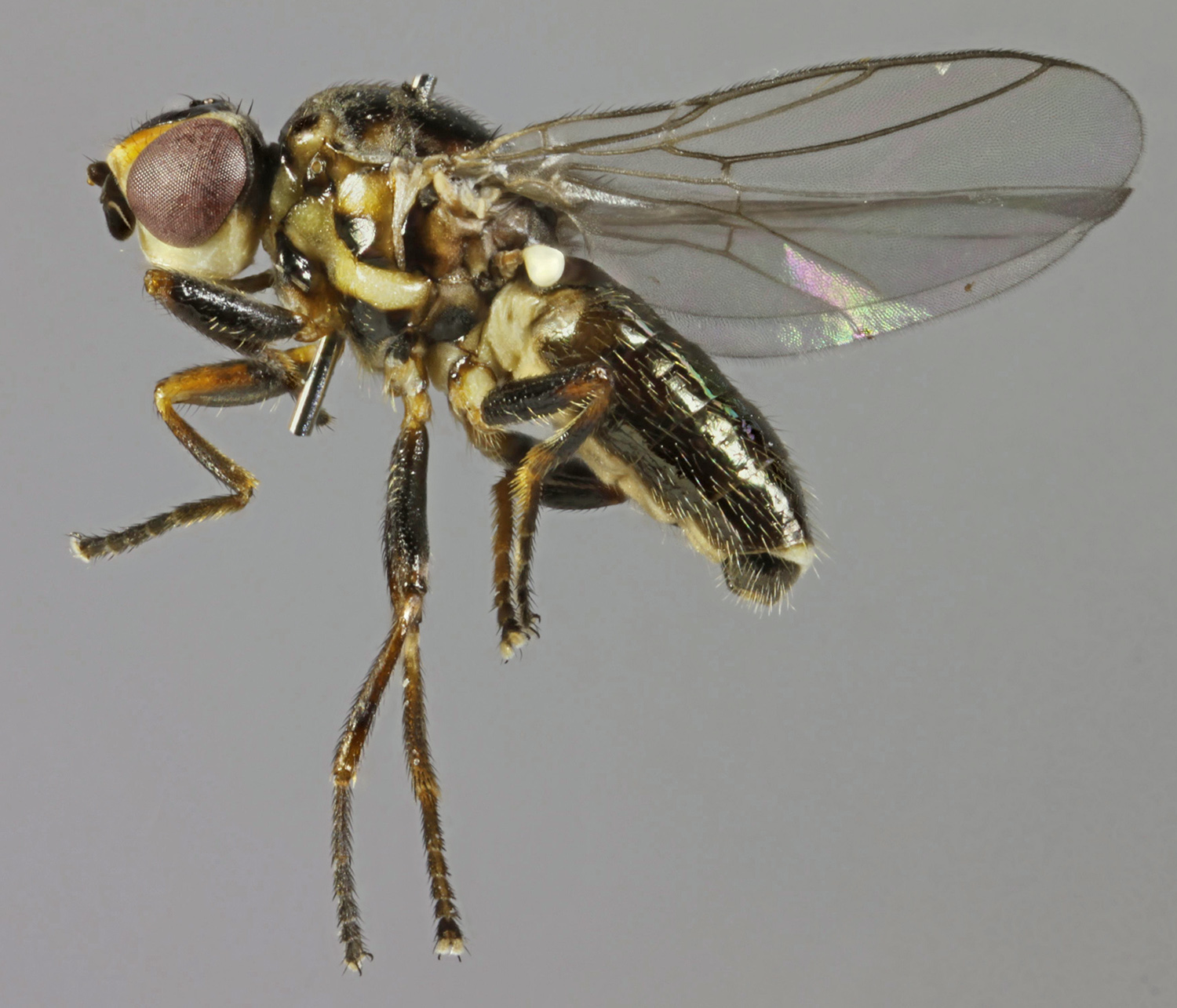
- Diplotoxa messoria

Scientific classification
- Domain: Eukaryota
- Kingdom: Animalia
- Phylum: Arthropoda
- Class: Insecta
- Order: Diptera
- Family: Chloropidae
- Subfamily: Chloropinae
- Genus: Diplotoxa; Loew, 1863

= Diplotoxa =

Genus of flies

Diplotoxa is a genus of grass flies in the family Chloropidae. There are about 8 described species in Diplotoxa.

== Species ==
- Diplotoxa alternata (Loew, 1872)
- Diplotoxa diplotoxoides (Becker, 1912)
- Diplotoxa inclinata Becker, 1912
- Diplotoxa messoria (Fallen, 1820)
- Diplotoxa nigripes (Coquillett, 1910)
- Diplotoxa recurva (Adams, 1903)
- Diplotoxa unicolor Becker, 1912
- Diplotoxa versicolor (Loew, 1863)
