= Paraeurina =

Scientific classification
- Domain: Eukaryota
- Kingdom: Animalia
- Phylum: Arthropoda
- Class: Insecta
- Order: Diptera
- Family: Chloropidae
- Subfamily: Chloropinae
- Genus: Paraeurina; Duda, 1933

Genus of flies

Paraeurina is a genus of frit flies in the family Chloropidae. There are at least two described species in Paraeurina.

== Species ==
These two species belong to the genus Paraeurina:

- Paraeurina acuminata (Fedoseeva, 1964)^{c g}
- Paraeurina chloropoides (Strobl, 1909)^{c g}

Data sources: i = ITIS, c = Catalogue of Life, g = GBIF, b = Bugguide.net
