= Sacatonia =

Scientific classification
- Kingdom: Animalia
- Phylum: Arthropoda
- Clade: Pancrustacea
- Class: Insecta
- Order: Diptera
- Family: Chloropidae
- Genus: Sacatonia

Genus of flies

Sacatonia is a genus of flies in the family of Chloropidae.
