= Capnoptera =

Scientific classification
- Domain: Eukaryota
- Kingdom: Animalia
- Phylum: Arthropoda
- Class: Insecta
- Order: Diptera
- Family: Chloropidae
- Subfamily: Chloropinae
- Genus: Capnoptera; Loew, 1866

Genus of flies

Capnoptera is a genus of frit flies in the family Chloropidae. There are at least three described species in Capnoptera.

== Species ==
These three species belong to the genus Capnoptera:

- Capnoptera breviantennata Becker, 1910
- Capnoptera pilosa Loew, 1866
- Capnoptera scutata (Rossi, 1790)

Data sources: i = ITIS, c = Catalogue of Life, g = GBIF, b = Bugguide.net
