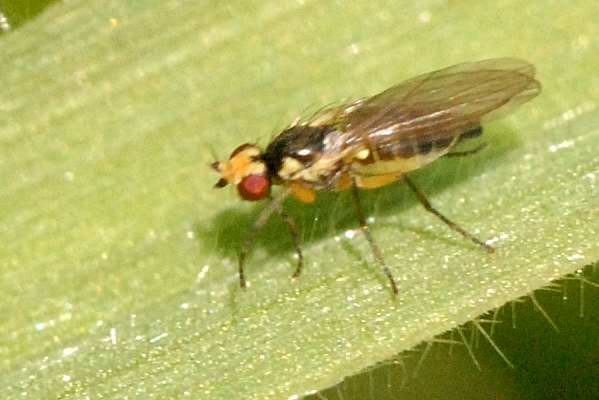
- Cryptonevra flavitarsis

Scientific classification
- Kingdom: Animalia
- Phylum: Arthropoda
- Class: Insecta
- Order: Diptera
- Family: Chloropidae
- Subfamily: Chloropinae
- Genus: Cryptonevra; Lioy, 1864

= Cryptonevra =

Genus of flies

Cryptonevra is a genus of fly in the family Chloropidae.
