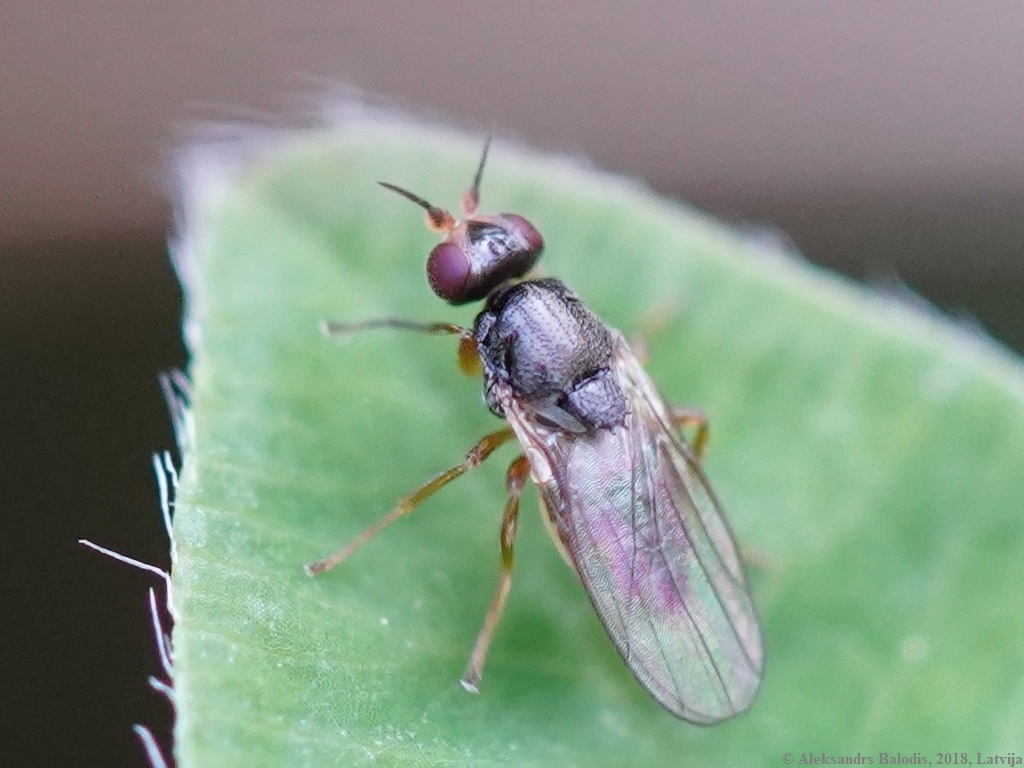
- Elachiptera tuberculifera

Scientific classification
- Domain: Eukaryota
- Kingdom: Animalia
- Phylum: Arthropoda
- Class: Insecta
- Order: Diptera
- Family: Chloropidae
- Subfamily: Oscinellinae
- Genus: Elachiptera; Macquart, 1835

Synonyms
- Ceratobarys Coquillett, 1898

= Elachiptera =

Genus of flies

Elachiptera is a genus of frit flies in the family Chloropidae. There are about 18 described species in Elachiptera.

== Species ==
- Elachiptera angusta Sabrosky, 1948
- Elachiptera angustifrons Sabrosky, 1948
- Elachiptera angustistylum Sabrosky, 1948
- Elachiptera californica Sabrosky, 1948
- Elachiptera costata (Loew, 1863)
- Elachiptera decipiens (Loew, 1863)
- Elachiptera erythropleura Sabrosky, 1948
- Elachiptera flaviceps Sabrosky, 1948
- Elachiptera formosa (Loew, 1863)
- Elachiptera knowltoni Sabrosky, 1948
- Elachiptera longiventris (Johannsen, 1924)
- Elachiptera nigriceps (Loew, 1863)
- Elachiptera pechumani Sabrosky, 1948
- Elachiptera penita (Adams, 1908)
- Elachiptera punctulata Becker, 1912
- Elachiptera tau Sabrosky, 1948
- Elachiptera vittata Sabrosky, 1948
- Elachiptera willistoni Sabrosky, 1948
