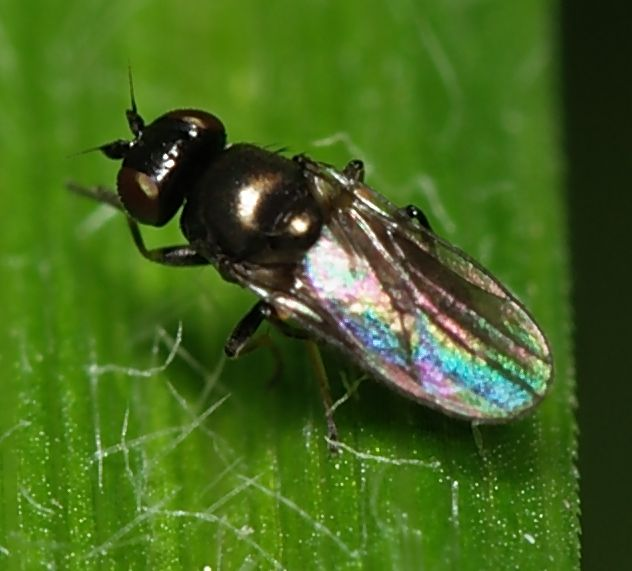
- Oscinella sp.

Scientific classification
- Domain: Eukaryota
- Kingdom: Animalia
- Phylum: Arthropoda
- Class: Insecta
- Order: Diptera
- Family: Chloropidae
- Subfamily: Oscinellinae
- Genus: Oscinella; Becker, 1909

= Oscinella =

Genus of flies

Oscinella sp. in copula

Oscinella is a genus of flies in the family Chloropidae.

== Species ==
- O. agropyri Balachovsky & Mesnil, 1935
- O. alopecuri Balachovsky & Mesnil, 1935
- O. angularis Collin, 1946
- O. angustipennis Duda, 1933
- O. cariciphila Collin, 1946
- O. exigua Collin, 1946
- O. festucae Balachovsky & Mesnil, 1935
- O. frit (Linnaeus, 1758)
- O. grandissima (Sabrosky, 1940)
- O. kroeberi Duda, 1935
- O. maura (Fallén, 1820)
- O. nartshukiana Beschovski, 1978
- O. nigerrima (Macquart, 1935)
- O. nitidigenis (Becker, 1908)
- O. nitidissima (Meigen, 1838)
- O. painteri Sabrosky, 1940
- O. phlei Nartshuk, 1955
- O. pusilla (Meigen, 1830)
- O. rubidipes Becker, 1910
- O. smirnovi Nartshuk, 1955
- O. trochanterata Collin, 1946
- O. vastator (Curtis, 1845)
- O. ventricosi Nartshuk, 1955
- O. vindicata (Meigen, 1830)
