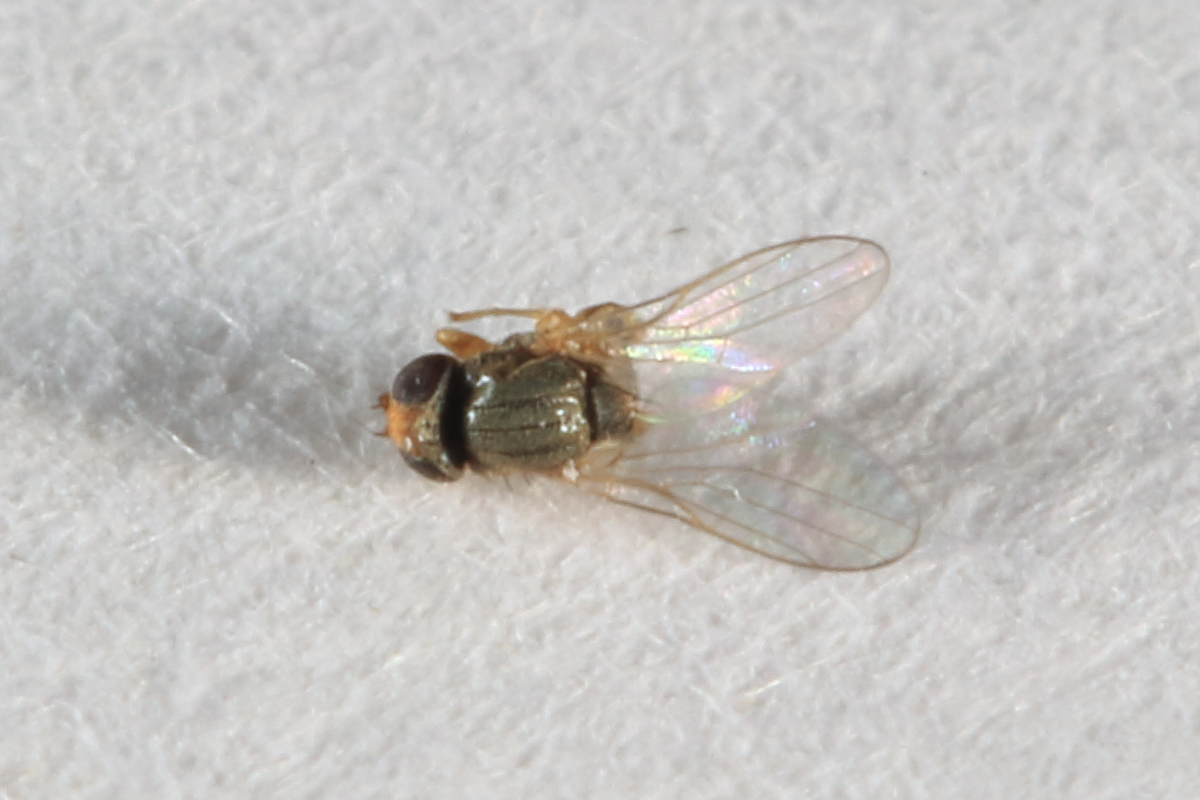

Scientific classification
- Domain: Eukaryota
- Kingdom: Animalia
- Phylum: Arthropoda
- Class: Insecta
- Order: Diptera
- Family: Chloropidae
- Subfamily: Oscinellinae
- Genus: Tricimba

= Tricimba =

Genus of flies

Tricimba is a genus of frit flies in the family Chloropidae. There are about 7 described species in Tricimba.

== Species ==
- Tricimba brunnicollis (Becker, 1912)
- Tricimba cincta (Meigen, 1830)
- Tricimba lineella (Fallen, 1820)
- Tricimba melancholica (Becker, 1912)
- Tricimba occidentalis Sabrosky, 1938
- Tricimba spinigera Malloch, 1913
- Tricimba trisculcata (Adams, 1905)
