= Xena (fly) =

Scientific classification
- Kingdom: Animalia
- Phylum: Arthropoda
- Class: Insecta
- Order: Diptera
- Family: Chloropidae
- Tribe: Mindini
- Genus: Xena; Nartshuk, 1964
- Species: X. straminea

Binomial name
- Xena straminea Nartshuk, 1964

Genus of flies

Xena is a genus of Grass Flies in the family Chloropidae. This genus has a single species, Xena straminea, found in mountain regions of Switzerland, east to Russia and central Asia.
