= Trigonomma =

Scientific classification
- Kingdom: Animalia
- Phylum: Arthropoda
- Class: Insecta
- Order: Diptera
- Family: Chloropidae
- Genus: Trigonomma

Genus of flies

Trigonomma is a genus of flies in the family Chloropidae.
