= Neodiplotoxa =

Scientific classification
- Kingdom: Animalia
- Phylum: Arthropoda
- Class: Insecta
- Order: Diptera
- Family: Chloropidae
- Genus: Neodiplotoxa; Malloch, 1914

Genus of flies

Neodiplotoxa is a genus of flies in the family Chloropidae.

== Species ==
- Neodiplotoxa pulchripes (Loew, 1872)
- Neodiplotoxa nigricans (Loew, 1872)
- Neodiplotoxa mexicana (Duda, 1930)
- Neodiplotoxa albiseta (Becker, 1912)
