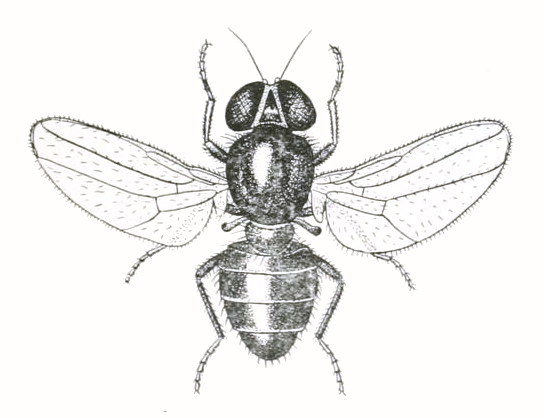
- Siphunculina funicola

Scientific classification
- Domain: Eukaryota
- Kingdom: Animalia
- Phylum: Arthropoda
- Class: Insecta
- Order: Diptera
- Family: Chloropidae
- Subfamily: Oscinellinae
- Genus: Siphunculina; Rondani, 1856

Species
- see text

= Siphunculina =

Genus of flies

Siphunculina is a genus of small flies known as tropical eye flies. They are known for their habit of lachryphagy, visiting the eyes of humans and other vertebrates to feed on fluids, and in doing so cause annoyance, spread bacterial or viral diseases or cause injury to the eye. They have a habit of resting in large numbers on suspended strings, ropes and cobwebs.

Several species are known from the Old World, including Asia, Europe and Africa.

== Species ==
Some of the species include:

- Siphunculina aenea Macquart, 1835
- Siphunculina aureopilosa Séguy, 1938
- Siphunculina aureosetosa Nartshuk, 1992
- Siphunculina breviseta Malloch, 1924
- Siphunculina corbetti Duda, 1936
- Siphunculina fasciata Cherian, 1971
- Siphunculina freyi Sabrosky, 1957
- Siphunculina funicola Meijere, 1905
- Siphunculina intonsa Lamb, 1918
- Siphunculina lobeliaphila Sabrosky, 1951
- Siphunculina loici Nartshuk, 2001
- Siphunculina lurida Enderlein, 1911
- Siphunculina manipurensis Cherian, 1977
- Siphunculina matilei Nartshuk, 2001
- Siphunculina mediana Becker, 1912
- Siphunculina minima Meijere, 1908
- Siphunculina montana Spencer, 1977
- Siphunculina nidicola Nartshuk, 1971
- Siphunculina nitidissima Kanmiya, 1982
- Siphunculina ornatifrons Loew, 1858
- Siphunculina peraspera Séguy, 1957
- Siphunculina punctifrons Sabrosky, 1954
- Siphunculina quinquangula Loew, 1873
- Siphunculina sharmai Cherian, 1977
- Siphunculina stackelbergi Duda, 1933
- Siphunculina stigmatica Kanmiya, 1994
- Siphunculina striolatus Wiedemann, 1830
- Siphunculina ulceria Cherian, 1971
