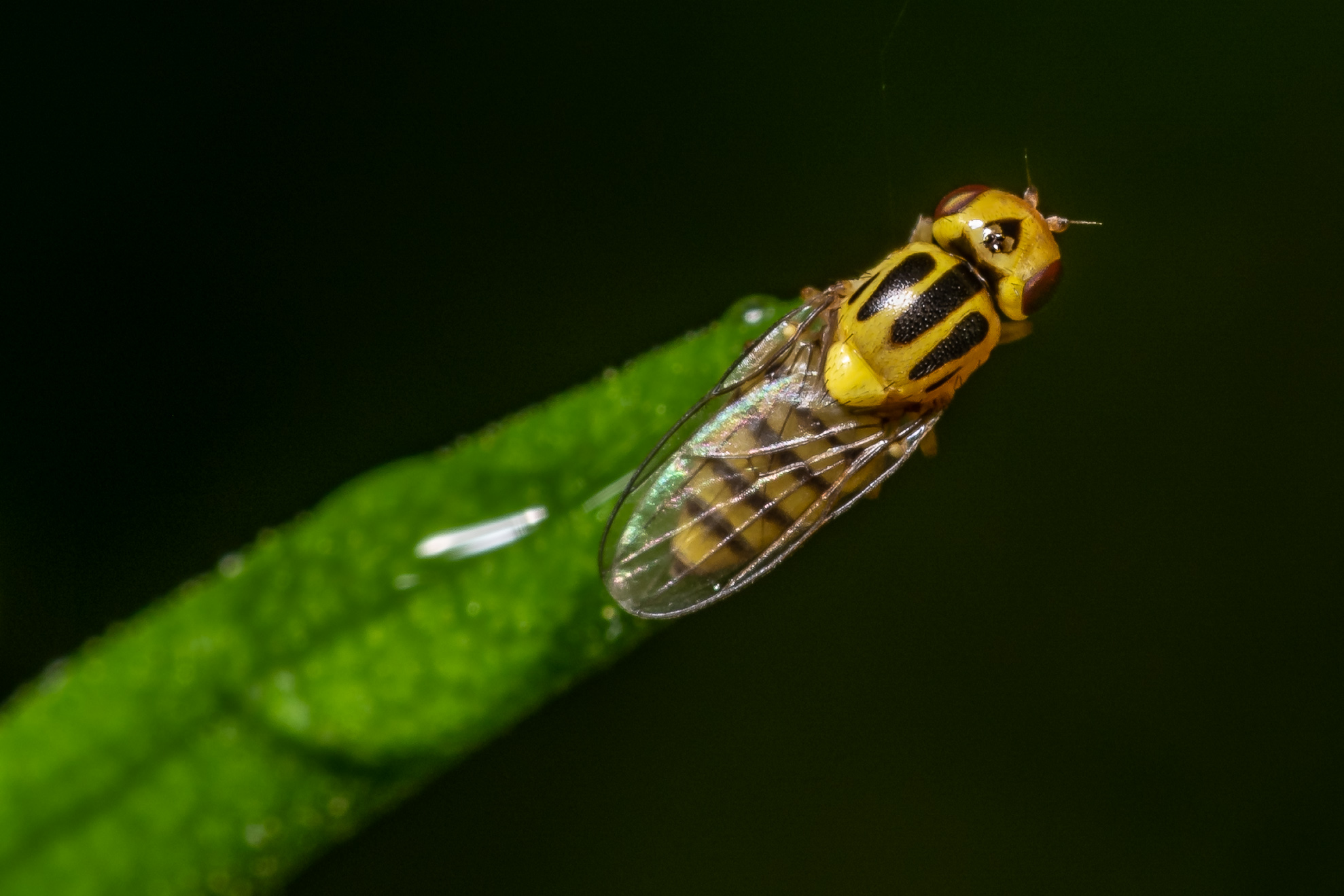
- Chlorops sp.

Scientific classification
- Kingdom: Animalia
- Phylum: Arthropoda
- Clade: Pancrustacea
- Class: Insecta
- Order: Diptera
- Clade: Eremoneura
- Clade: Cyclorrhapha
- Section: Schizophora
- Subsection: Acalyptratae
- Superfamily: Carnoidea
- Family: Chloropidae; Rondani, 1856

Subfamilies
- Chloropinae; Oscinellinae; Rhodesiellinae; Siphonellopsinae

Diversity
- More than 160 genera

Synonyms
- Mindidae

= Chloropidae =

Family of insects

The Chloropidae are a family of flies commonly known as frit flies or grass flies. About 2000 described species are in over 160 genera distributed worldwide. These are usually very small flies, yellow or black and appearing shiny due to the virtual absence of any hairs. The majority of the larvae are phytophagous, mainly on grasses, and can be major pests of cereals. However, parasitic and predatory species are known. A few species are kleptoparasites. Some species in the genera Hippelates and Siphunculina (S. funicola being quite well known in Asia) are called eye gnats or eye flies for their habit of being attracted to the fluids produced by eyes. They feed on lachrymal secretions and other body fluids of various animals, including humans, and can transmit pathogens in the process. As a result, Chloropidae can be a medical or veterinary concern.

There are scant records of chloropids from amber deposits, mostly from the Eocene and Oligocene periods although some material may suggest the family dates back to the Cretaceous or earlier.

== Family characteristics ==
Chloropidae are minute to small (1.0 to 4.0 mm), rarely medium-sized, flies (6.0 to 9.0 and 12 mm)

They are either black, gray, yellow, or greenish and the mesonotum often has a pattern of three to five dark longitudinal stripes against a light-colored background. The head in profile is trapezoidal or triangular. Bristles on the head are weakly developed. Long orbital bristles on the head are present only in a few genera. The vertical triangle is often large, (occupying almost all of the frons), and glossy, or matte (making it almost imperceptible). Arista for the most part thin with short sparse pubescence. Rarely the arista is densely pubescent in which case it appears thickened, or sometimes thickened and flattened. The proboscis is usually short and soft, only rarely with elongated sclerotized labella. The margin of the mouth is extended with elongation of proboscis and the vibrissal corner is raised beyond the margin of the eye.

The wings usually developed, only sometimes slightly shortened, rarely reduced to small disks (plates), with reduced venation. Sometimes femora 3 rarely femora 1 thickened; in the latter case the corresponding (1) tibia is usually curved. Some subantartic species have no wings.

The preabdomen in male consists of five segments: tergites 1 and tergite 2 are fused. Between tergite 5 of the abdomen and the hypopygium only one sclerite is present dorsally, with two close-set spiracles on each side. Sometimes this sclerite is reduced and rarely membranous swellings occur in this region, which are usually retracted and visible only in macerated specimens. In the subfamily Oscinellinae the hypopygium usually has well developed cerci and edites. The cerci in subfamily Chloropinae usually fused and for the most part reduced, and edites are reduced in size, pushed under the epandrium, and sometimes fused with it. The gonites are usually small, for most part membranous, and rarely highly sclerotized (Meromyza Mg.). For many species an examination of the genitalia of male, rarely of female, is essential for a precise species identification. See

== Biology ==
Larvae are mainly phytophages of Poaceae, Cyperaceae, and Typhaceae; they develop inside the vegetative or reproductive parts, sometimes directly in the inflorescence or seeds. Some species cause the formation of unusual cigar-shaped galls on stems. Many species are known as serious pests of grain cereals. These include Oscinella frit L. and O. pusilla Mg., Chlorops pumilionis Bjerkander, Chlorops oryzae Matsumura an important pest of rice in eastern Asia and Meromyza saltatrix L., and M. nigriventris Mcq. flies of the genus Dicraeus Lw. damage the seeds of some bromes and wheat grasses.

Many larvae are saprophages living in rotting or dying wood, usually in association with other insects, and in dead parts of herbaceous plants damaged by other insects. More rarely they feed in fungi. In a small number of species the larvae are predators and live in the egg cocoons of spiders, praying mantis, or the nests of locusts. Some species prey on root grubs.

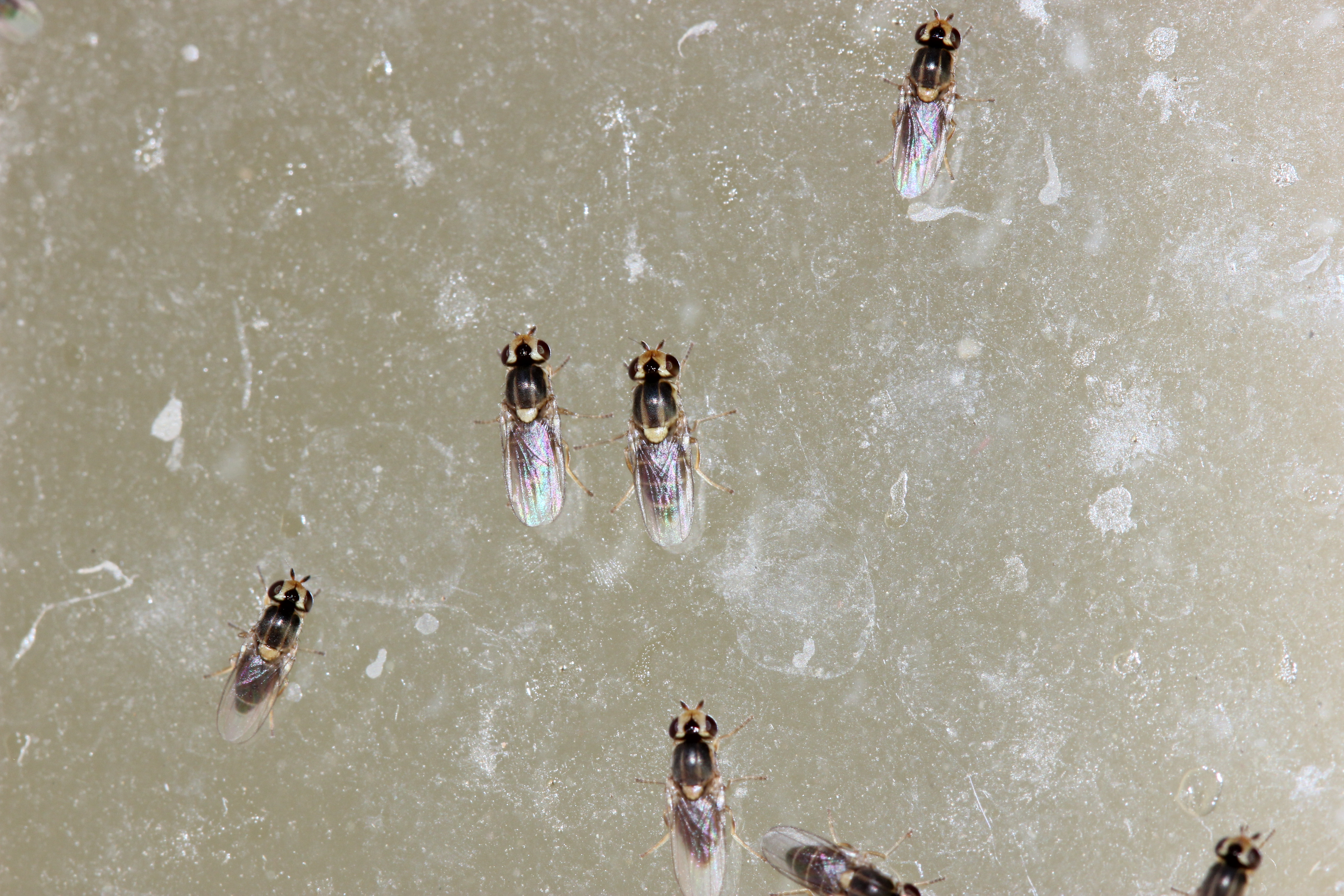
Chloropid flies assembling on a window

Flies of most of the species of Chloropidae commonly in grass. Some species will assemble in large numbers on trunks and branches of trees and shrubs, sometimes on plants in flower. They sometimes assemble in thousands on walls or windows.

Larvae of many species in temperate regions will hibernate in winter diapause and in some species the imago also hibernates.

== Medical and veterinary significance ==
Chloropidae are not of importance in human medicine in the same way as blood sucking vectors such as mosquitoes or black flies. Also, in contrast to specialist pathogens such as Plasmodium or Trypanosoma, the pathogens that Chloropidae transmit are not adapted to particular vectors. However, some Chloropidae are troublesome in that they act as purely mechanical agents of disease transmission. Species that occur in large numbers and are attracted to animal secretions, such as tears and dung, sometimes cause serious irritation and infection. Prominent examples include the eye gnat genera: Liohippelates in the Americas and Siphunculina in parts of Asia. Their larvae are soil saprophages that have several generations per year and accordingly can multiply rapidly. In warm seasons they may emerge in huge numbers and swarm about the eyes, up the nostrils and in the mouths of mammals, including livestock and humans. The irritation can be so great as to compel the use of gauze face masks for humans and even for animals. Furthermore, the flies are so small that the gauze must be very fine to offer effective protection.

Apart from the irritation however, the flies frequently move from host to host and from anus to face or to open lesions; accordingly they can be dangerous vehicles for many infectious organisms. Bacterial examples, in particular in the Caribbean and parts of South America, include the transmission of Treponema pallidum pertenue, the spirochaete that causes yaws. Less specifically, any of a range of bacterial species can cause human acute conjunctivitis (pinkeye), and understandably the incidence of pinkeye tends to rise sharply when relevant species of Chloropidae are swarming.

Haemophilus influenzae biotype aegyptius is the pathogen that causes the highly dangerous Brazilian purpuric fever; in children it usually is rapidly fatal, and various species in the family Chloropidae are potential transmitters of the disease.

As another example of bacterial transport, some species of Chloropidae may carry various strains of Streptococcal skin infections.

Apart from bacterial pathogens, Chloropidae also may transmit viral diseases; in particular they have been shown to carry the vesicular stomatitis virus.

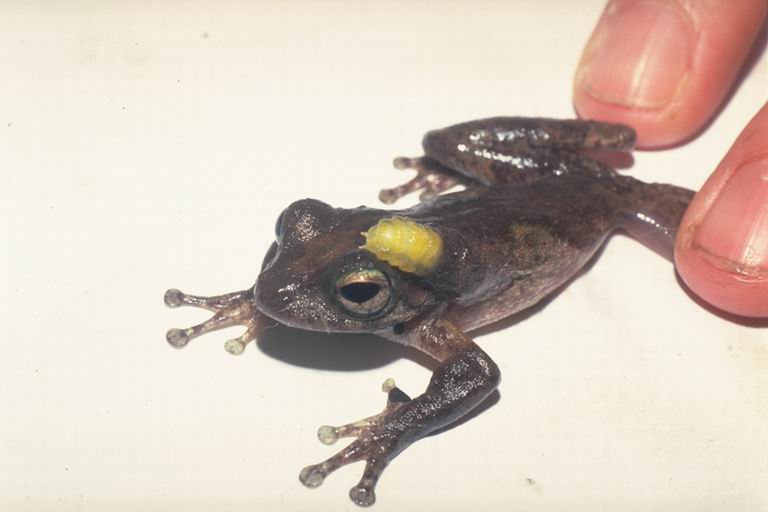
A Batrachomyia larva parasitizes a Litoria genimaculata frog

Though Chloropidae generally do not attack vertebrates directly, the larvae of the Australian frog flies, genus Batrachomyia, are exceptions. They cause myiasis in frogs. The parent fly, like most adult Chloropidae, feeds mainly on plant juices, but it lays its eggs near the frog. The larvae burrow under the skin of the body rather than the head or legs, and there they form visible swellings in which they lie as parasites, presumably feeding on blood and other bodily fluids. Most of the host frogs survive, but some do die.

== Phylogenetics ==
- Carnoidea
  - - Australimyzidae
    - Carnidae
  - - Canacidae sensu lato
    - - Milichiidae
      - - Cryptochetidae
        - Chloropidae

== Gallery ==
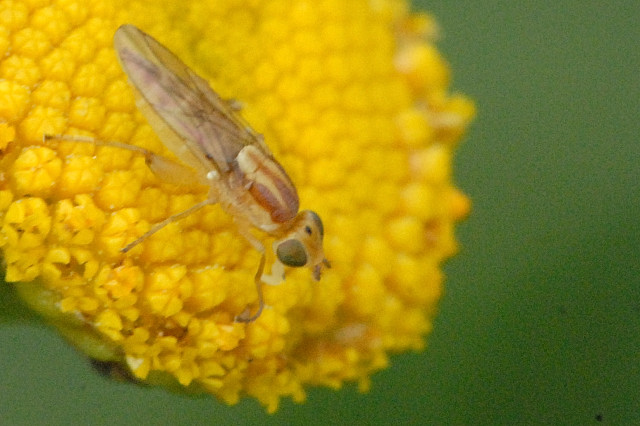
Meromyza saltatrix

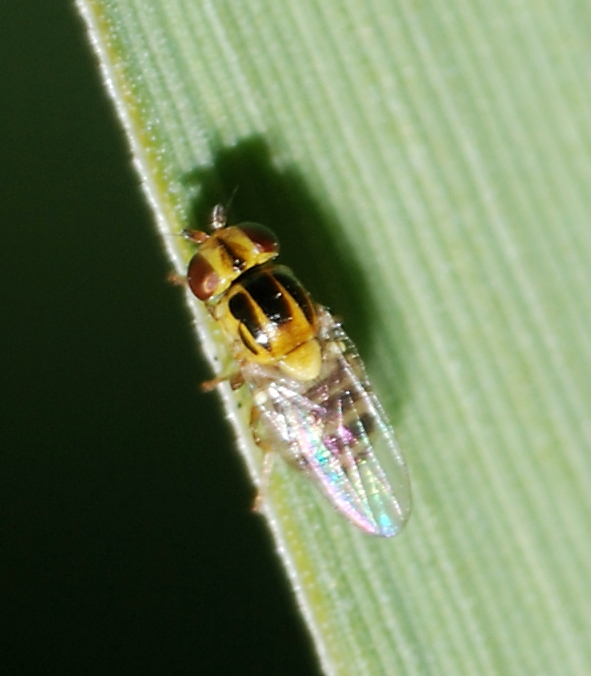
Thaumatomyia notata

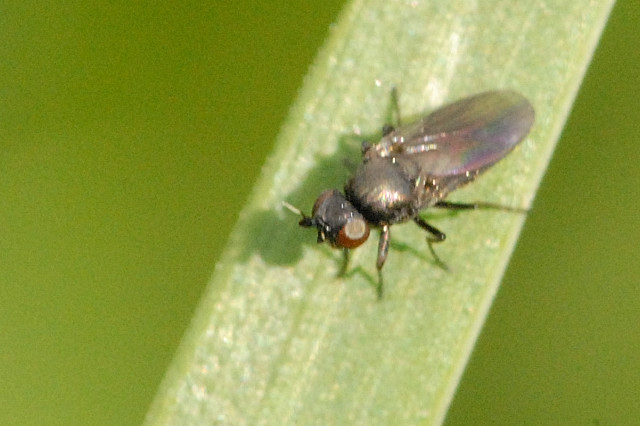
Oscinella sp.

Meromyza sp. on Achillea millefolium (video, 1m 57s)

Chlorops sp. on Tanacetum vulgare (video, 51s)
