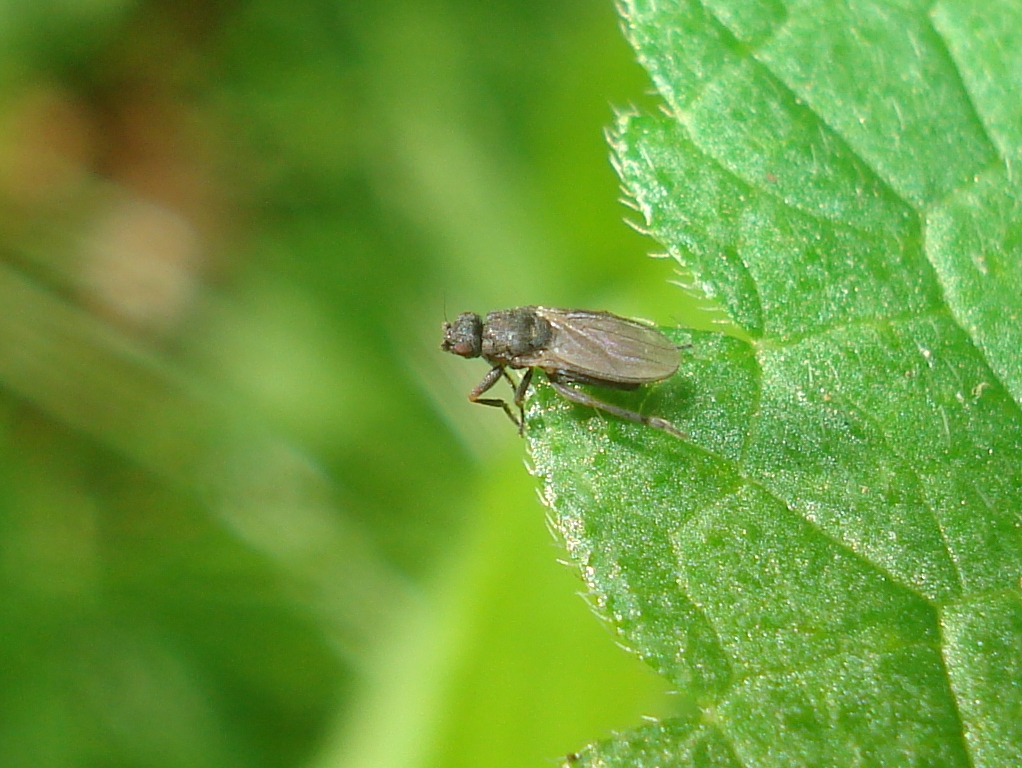
- Desmometopa

Scientific classification
- Kingdom: Animalia
- Phylum: Arthropoda
- Class: Insecta
- Order: Diptera
- Family: Milichiidae
- Subfamily: Madizinae

= Madizinae =

Subfamily of flies

Madizinae is a subfamily of freeloader flies in the family Milichiidae. There are about 8 genera and more than 160 described species in Madizinae.

== Genera ==
These eight genera belong to the subfamily Madizinae:

- Aldrichiomyza Hendel, 1914
- Desmometopa Loew, 1866
- Leptometopa Becker, 1903
- Madiza Fallén, 1810
- Neophyllomyza Melander, 1913
- Paramyia Williston, 1897
- Phyllomyza Fallén, 1810
- Stomosis Melander, 1913
