= Paramyia nitens =

Scientific classification
- Domain: Eukaryota
- Kingdom: Animalia
- Phylum: Arthropoda
- Class: Insecta
- Order: Diptera
- Family: Milichiidae
- Genus: Paramyia
- Species: P. nitens

Binomial name
- Paramyia nitens (Loew, 1869)

Synonyms
- Phyllomyza nitens Loew, 1869

Species of fly

Paramyia nitens is a species of freeloader flies in the family Milichiidae.
