= Phyllomyza milnei =

Scientific classification
- Kingdom: Animalia
- Phylum: Arthropoda
- Class: Insecta
- Order: Diptera
- Family: Milichiidae
- Genus: Phyllomyza
- Species: P. milnei

Binomial name
- Phyllomyza milnei Steyskal, 1942

Species of fly

Phyllomyza milnei is a species of freeloader flies in the family Milichiidae.
