= Lasiambia =

Scientific classification
- Domain: Eukaryota
- Kingdom: Animalia
- Phylum: Arthropoda
- Class: Insecta
- Order: Diptera
- Family: Chloropidae
- Subfamily: Oscinellinae
- Genus: Lasiambia; Sabrosky, 1941

Genus of flies

Lasiambia is a genus of flies in the family Chloropidae.
