= Desmometopa varipalpis =

Scientific classification
- Domain: Eukaryota
- Kingdom: Animalia
- Phylum: Arthropoda
- Class: Insecta
- Order: Diptera
- Family: Milichiidae
- Genus: Desmometopa
- Species: D. varipalpis

Binomial name
- Desmometopa varipalpis Malloch, 1927

Species of fly

Desmometopa varipalpis is a species of freeloader fly in the family Milichiidae. It is found in Europe.
