= Pseudochaeta (subgenus) =

Scientific classification
- Kingdom: Animalia
- Phylum: Arthropoda
- Class: Insecta
- Order: Diptera
- Family: Tachinidae
- Subfamily: Exoristinae
- Tribe: Goniini
- Genus: Pseudochaeta
- Subgenus: Pseudochaeta; Coquillett, 1895

Type species
- Pseudochaeta argentifrons Coquillett, 1895

Synonyms
- Dimasicera (Townsend, 1915)

Genus of flies

Pseudochaeta is a subgenus of flies in the family Tachinidae.

== Species ==
- Pseudochaeta argentifrons Coquillett, 1895
- Pseudochaeta brooksi Sabrosky & Arnaud, 1963
- Pseudochaeta clurina Reinhard, 1946
- Pseudochaeta finalis Reinhard, 1946
- Pseudochaeta frontalis Reinhard, 1946
- Pseudochaeta marginalis Reinhard, 1946
- Pseudochaeta perdecora Reinhard, 1946
- Pseudochaeta robusta (Reinhard, 1924)
- Pseudochaeta siminina Reinhard, 1946
