= Aldrichiomyza agromyzina =

Scientific classification
- Domain: Eukaryota
- Kingdom: Animalia
- Phylum: Arthropoda
- Class: Insecta
- Order: Diptera
- Family: Milichiidae
- Genus: Aldrichiomyza
- Species: A. agromyzina

Binomial name
- Aldrichiomyza agromyzina (Hendel, 1911)

Synonyms
- Aldrichiella agromyzina Hendel, 1911

Species of fly

Aldrichiomyza agromyzina is a species of freeloader fly in the family Milichiidae.
