= Milichiella lacteipennis =

Scientific classification
- Domain: Eukaryota
- Kingdom: Animalia
- Phylum: Arthropoda
- Class: Insecta
- Order: Diptera
- Family: Milichiidae
- Genus: Milichiella
- Species: M. lacteipennis

Binomial name
- Milichiella lacteipennis (Loew, 1866)

Synonyms
- Lobioptera lacteipennis Loew, 1866; Milichiella nigrella Cole, 1912

Species of fly

Milichiella lacteipennis is a species of freeloader flies in the family Milichiidae.
