= Milichiella arcuata =

Scientific classification
- Domain: Eukaryota
- Kingdom: Animalia
- Phylum: Arthropoda
- Class: Insecta
- Order: Diptera
- Family: Milichiidae
- Genus: Milichiella
- Species: M. arcuata

Binomial name
- Milichiella arcuata (Loew, 1876)

Synonyms
- Lobioptera arcuata Loew, 1876

Species of fly

Milichiella arcuata is a species of freeloader flies in the family Milichiidae.
