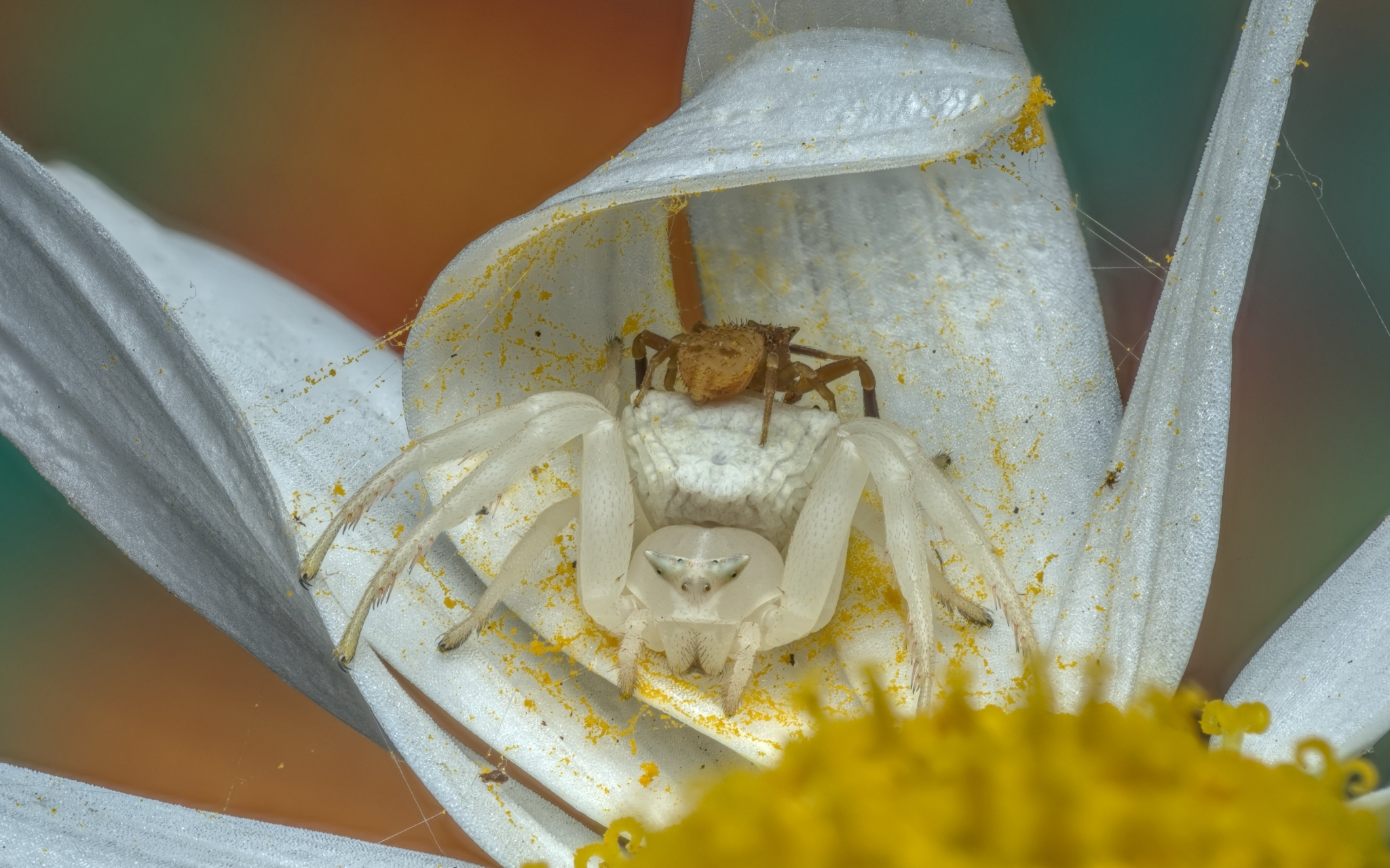
- Female with male
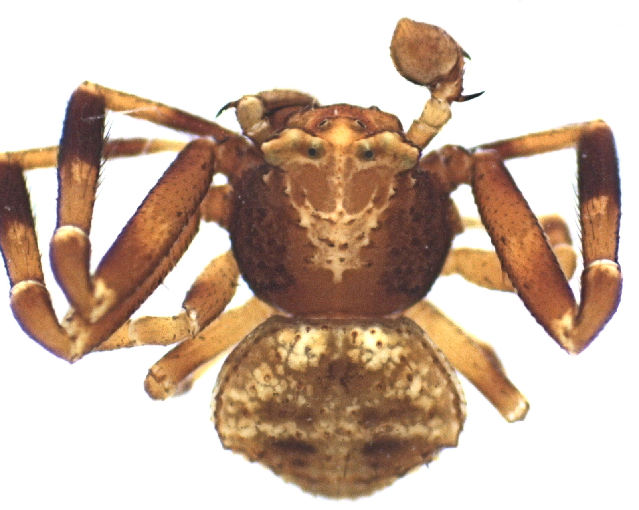
- Male

Scientific classification
- Kingdom: Animalia
- Phylum: Arthropoda
- Subphylum: Chelicerata
- Class: Arachnida
- Order: Araneae
- Infraorder: Araneomorphae
- Family: Thomisidae
- Genus: Thomisus
- Species: T. kalaharinus

Binomial name
- Thomisus kalaharinus Lawrence, 1936

Synonyms
- Thomisus urbensis Lawrence, 1942

= Thomisus kalaharinus =

Species of crab spider

Thomisus kalaharinus is a species of crab spider of the genus Thomisus. It is endemic to Sub-Saharan Africa and Yemen.

== Etymology ==
The specific epithet kalaharinus refers to the Kalahari Desert region where the type specimen was collected during the Vernay-Lang Kalahari Expedition in 1930.

== Taxonomy ==
Thomisus kalaharinus was first described by Reginald Frederick Lawrence in 1936 based on a female specimen from Botswana. In 1942, Lawrence described Thomisus urbensis, which was later synonymized with T. kalaharinus by Dippenaar-Schoeman in 1983. The male of the species was not described until 2023, when Dippenaar-Schoeman provided the first description based on specimens from South Africa.

== Distribution ==
Thomisus kalaharinus has a wide distribution throughout Sub-Saharan Africa, extending from southern Africa to the Arabian Peninsula. In South Africa, it has been recorded from all provinces. The species occurs at elevations ranging from 7 to 1,705 meters above sea level.

== Habitat ==
Thomisus kalaharinus is a free-living species found on various plants, primarily on grass and flowers. It has been recorded from all South African floral biomes except the Desert Biome. The species has also been collected from agricultural settings, including cotton fields and pistachio orchards. Adults can be found throughout the year.

== Description ==
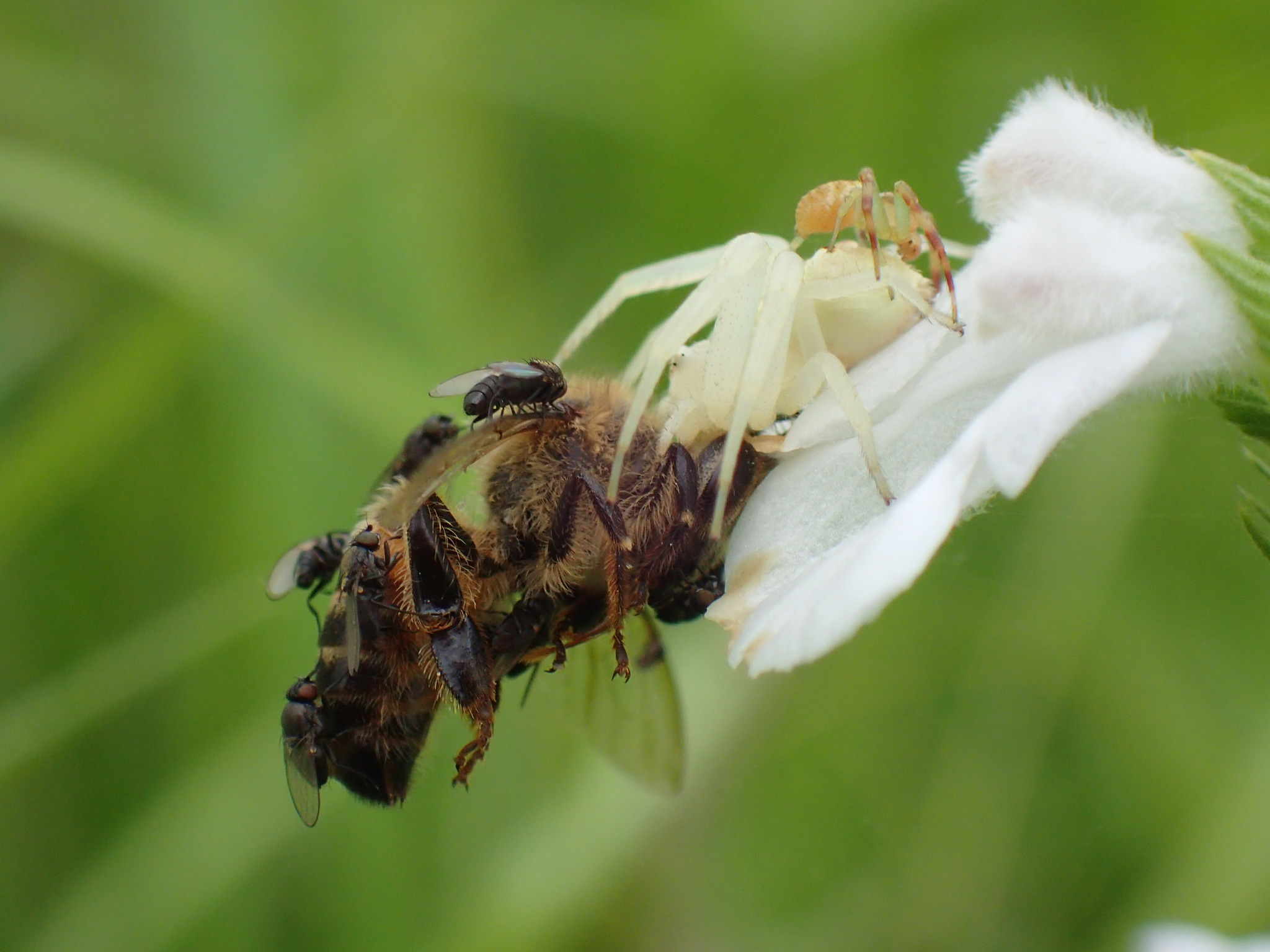
with bee, male and commensal flies

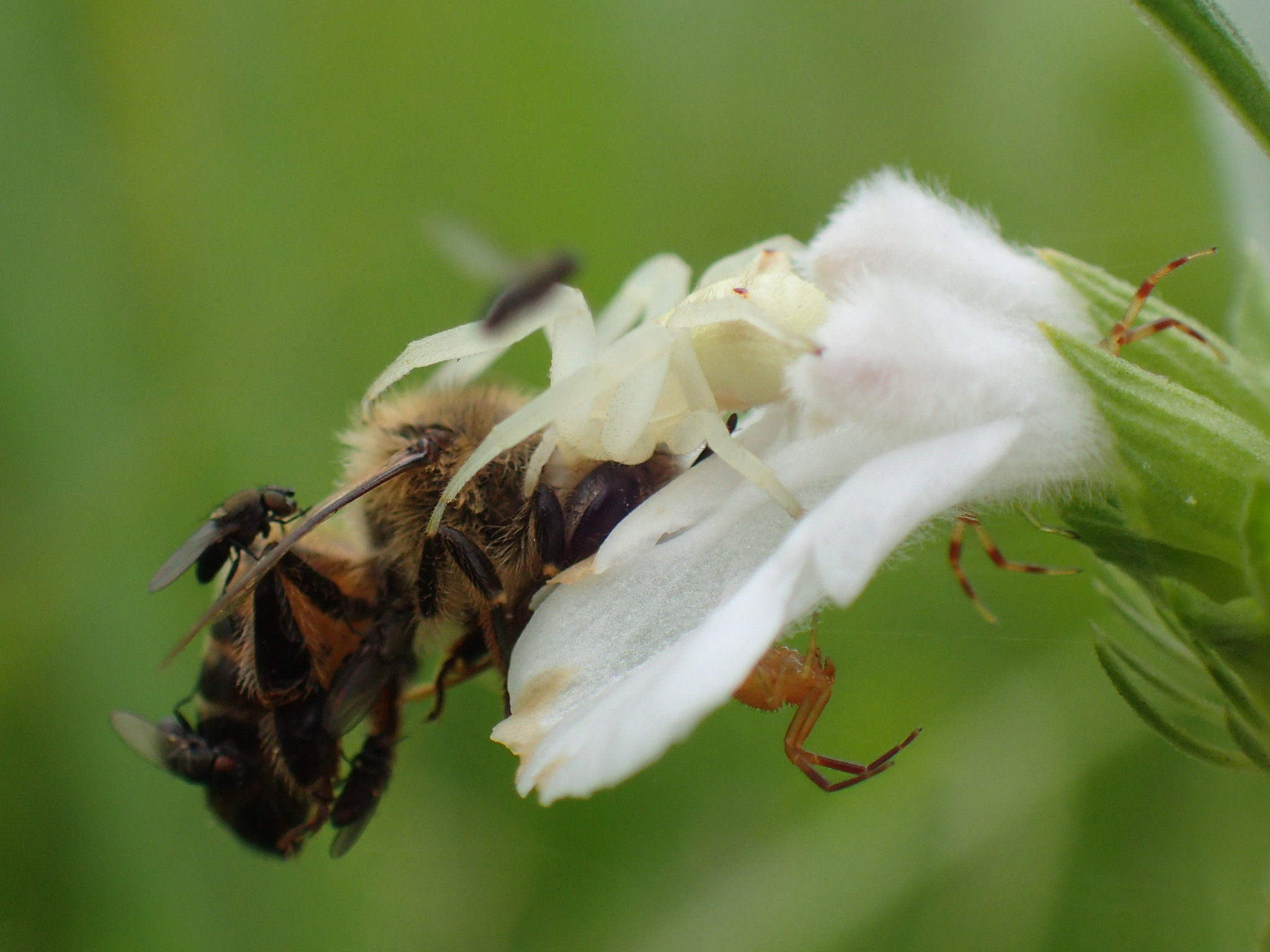
multiple males visible

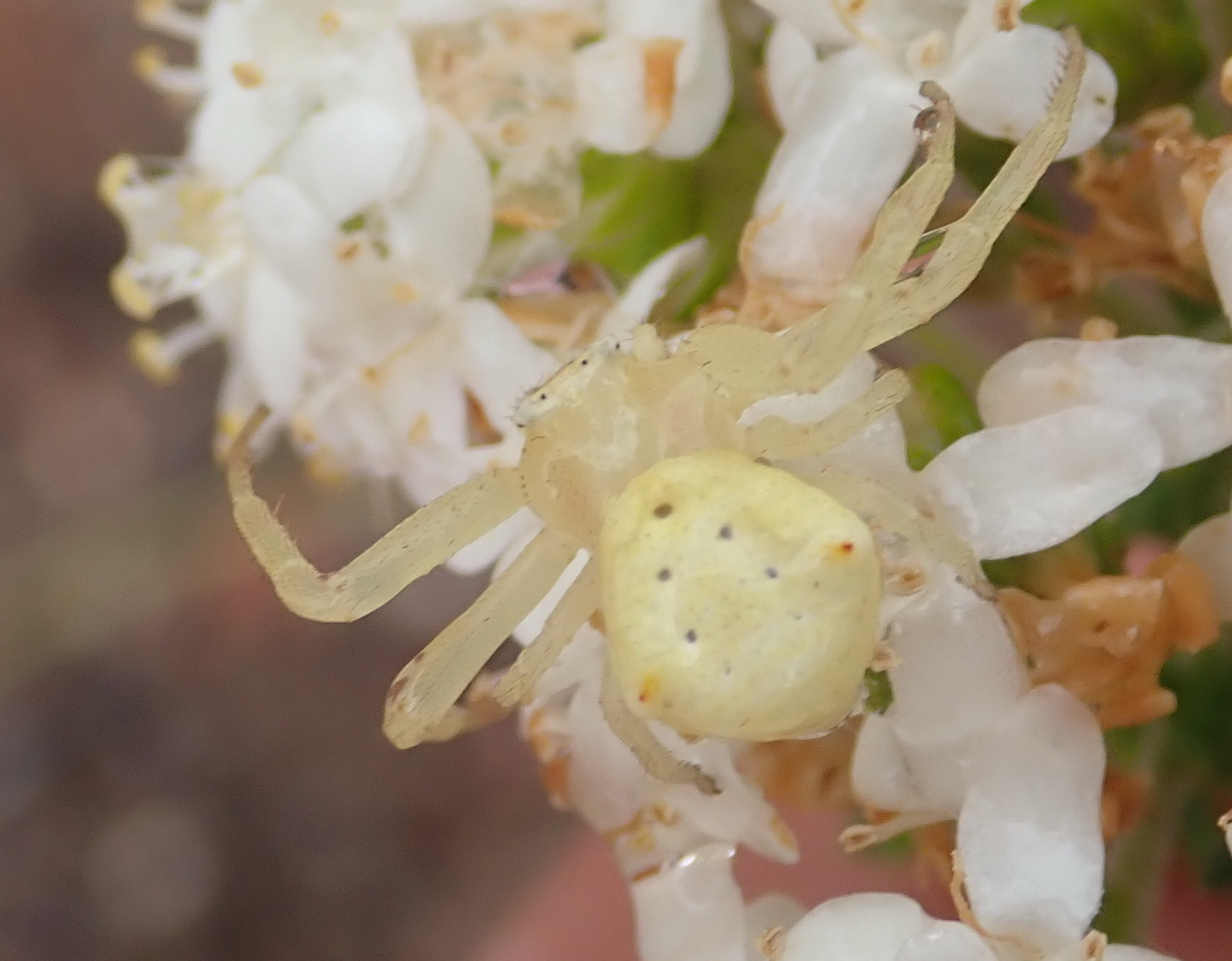

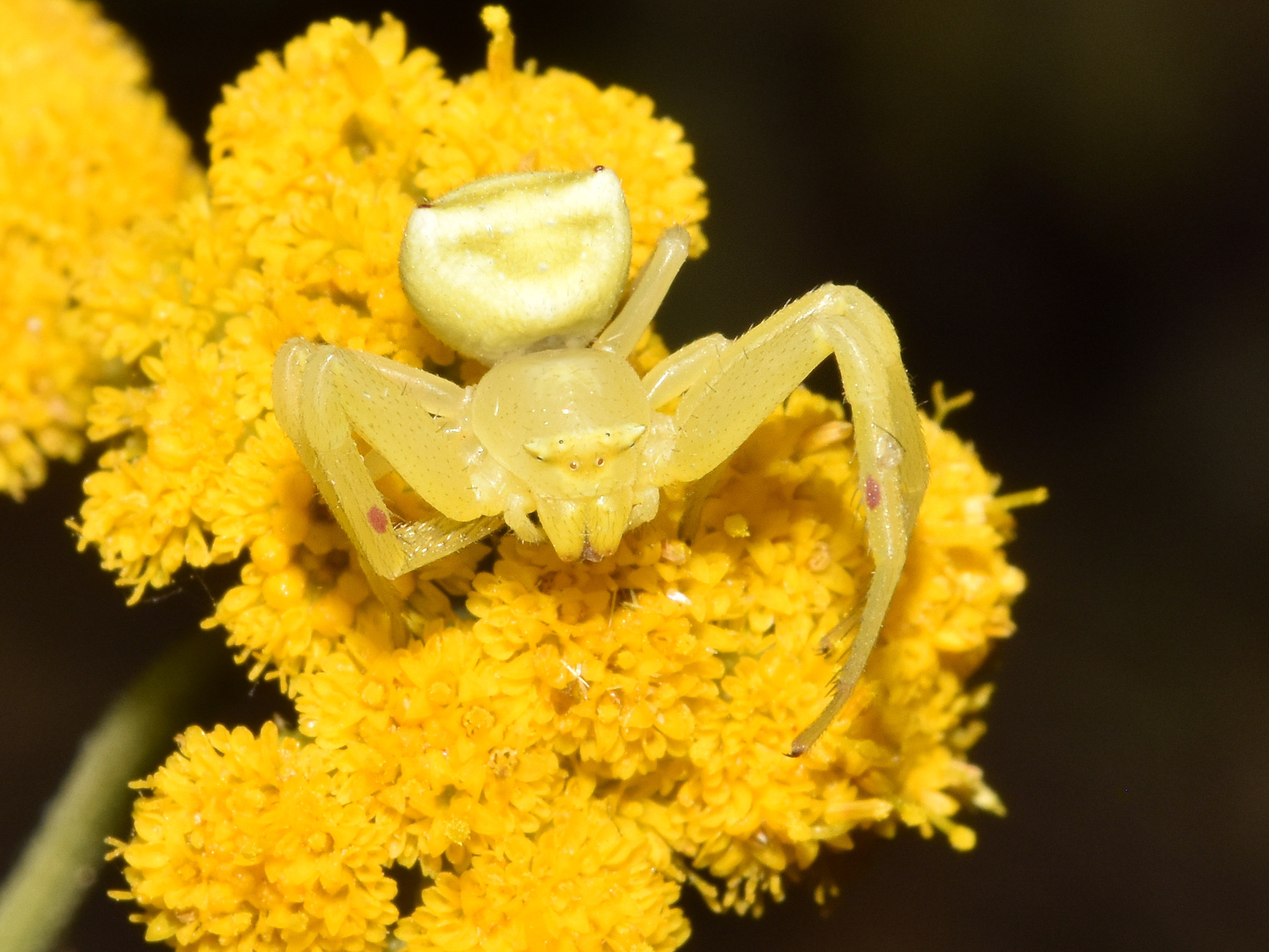

Thomisus kalaharinus exhibits marked sexual dimorphism in size, color, and body shape, which is characteristic of the genus Thomisus. Females are considerably larger than males and possess the ability to change color.

=== Females ===
Females range from 4.0–6.8 mm in total length. They can dramatically change color from white to yellow, with the body and legs uniformly colored to match their surroundings. The cephalothorax has an elevated cephalic area with distinctive ivory-white markings, including a U-shaped marking at the posterior apex connected to the ocular area by fine white lines on each side. The entire ocular region, including the tubercles and central portion of the clypeus, is ivory white, though the eye tubercles are not sharply pointed. The carapace is clothed with numerous short, spiniform setae. The opisthosoma bears blunt tubercles covered with spiniform setae. Preserved specimens lose all coloration.

=== Males ===
Males are much smaller, measuring around 2 mm in total length. The carapace is fawn-colored with brown bands dorsolaterally and a white triangular patch medially. The eye area is suffused with white and has a brown triangular pattern anteriorly. The sternum is pale, while the abdomen is dorsally fawn, mottled with white and brown, with darker patches laterally and pale ventrally.

The legs are brown with faintly banded femora, and the tibiae and metatarsi of legs I and II have darker distal halves. Each leg segment joint has a distinct thin white band. The carapace bears numerous strong, brown, erect spiniform setae in the triangular area posterior to the eye region, and the eye tubercles are strongly pointed. The oval abdomen bears strong, brown, erect spiniform setae, though abdominal tubercles are indistinct. The tibiae and metatarsi of legs I and II lack macro-setae but bear a thin layer of long, dark setae.

The male pedipalps are characterized by a downward-inclined tegular apophysis, similar to T. daradioides and T. citrinellus, but differ in having only one strong tubercle on the tibia of the palp, compared to two tubercles in the related species.

Mature males are frequently found positioned on the female's abdomen, waiting until she is ready to mate.

== Conservation status ==
Thomisus kalaharinus is classified as Least Concern due to its wide geographical range across multiple African countries. The species shows no apparent threats and maintains stable populations across its range.
