= Apallates =

Scientific classification
- Domain: Eukaryota
- Kingdom: Animalia
- Phylum: Arthropoda
- Class: Insecta
- Order: Diptera
- Family: Chloropidae
- Subfamily: Oscinellinae
- Genus: Apallates; Sabrosky, 1980

Genus of flies

Apallates is a genus of fly in the family Chloropidae.

== Species ==
- A. convexus (Loew, 1866)
- A. coxendix (Fitch, 1856)
- A. dissidens (Tucker, 1908)
- A. hermsi (Sabrosky, 1941)
- A. microcentrus (Coquillett, 1904)
- A. montanus (Sabrosky, 1941)
- A. neocoxendix (Sabrosky, 1040)
- A. ochripes (Sabrosky, 1940)
- A. particeps (Becker, 1912)
- A. tener (Coquillett, 1990)
