= Milichiella bisignata =

Scientific classification
- Domain: Eukaryota
- Kingdom: Animalia
- Phylum: Arthropoda
- Class: Insecta
- Order: Diptera
- Family: Milichiidae
- Genus: Milichiella
- Species: M. bisignata

Binomial name
- Milichiella bisignata Melander, 1913

Species of fly

Milichiidae bisignata is a species of freeloader fly in the family Milichiidae, found in North and Central America.

This species is treated in as a junior synonym of Milichiidae lucidula.
