= Pseudochaeta =

Scientific classification
- Kingdom: Animalia
- Phylum: Arthropoda
- Class: Insecta
- Order: Diptera
- Family: Tachinidae
- Subfamily: Exoristinae
- Tribe: Goniini
- Genus: Pseudochaeta; Coquillett, 1895

Type species
- Pseudochaeta argentifrons Coquillett, 1895

Synonyms
- Dimasicera (Townsend, 1915)

Genus of flies

Pseudochaeta is a genus of flies in the family Tachinidae.

== Species ==
- Subgenus Metopiops Townsend, 1912

- Pseudochaeta mirabilis (Townsend, 1912)
- Pseudochaeta pyralidis Coquillett, 1897

- Subgenus Phaenopsis Townsend, 1912

- Pseudochaeta arabella (Townsend, 1912)
- Pseudochaeta venusta (Reinhard, 1946)

- Subgenus Pseudochaeta Coquillett, 1895

- Pseudochaeta argentifrons Coquillett, 1895
- Pseudochaeta brooksi Sabrosky & Arnaud, 1963
- Pseudochaeta clurina Reinhard, 1946
- Pseudochaeta finalis Reinhard, 1946
- Pseudochaeta frontalis Reinhard, 1946
- Pseudochaeta marginalis Reinhard, 1946
- Pseudochaeta perdecora Reinhard, 1946
- Pseudochaeta robusta (Reinhard, 1924)
- Pseudochaeta siminina Reinhard, 1946

- Unplaced to subgenus

- Pseudochaeta curepei Thompson, 1964
- Pseudochaeta flavipalpis Thompson, 1964
- Pseudochaeta latitarsus Thompson, 1964
- Pseudochaeta cminuta (Wulp, 1890)
- Pseudochaeta nitens Thompson, 1964
- Pseudochaeta syngamiae Thompson, 1964
- Pseudochaeta trinitatis Thompson, 1964
