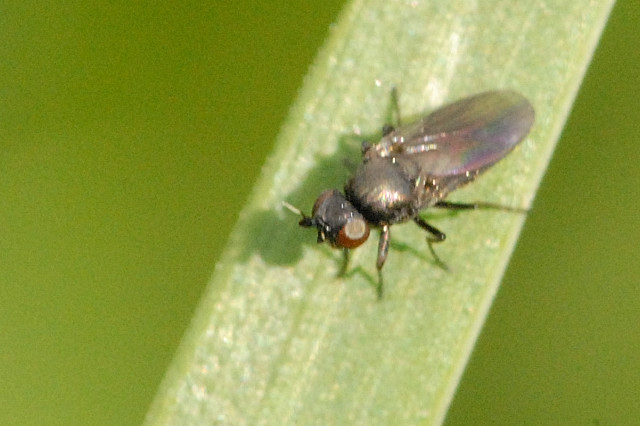
- Oscinella

Scientific classification
- Domain: Eukaryota
- Kingdom: Animalia
- Phylum: Arthropoda
- Class: Insecta
- Order: Diptera
- Family: Chloropidae
- Subfamily: Oscinellinae; Becker, 1910

= Oscinellinae =

Subfamily of flies

Oscinellinae is a subfamily of frit flies in the family Chloropidae. There are at least 40 genera and 180 described species in Oscinellinae.

== Genera ==
- Apallates Sabrosky, 1980
- Aphanotrigonum Duda, 1932
- Biorbitella
- Cadrema
- Calamoncosis Enderlein, 1911
- Ceratobarys Coquillett, 1929
- Chaetochlorops Malloch, 1914
- Conioscinella Duda, 1929
- Dasyopa Malloch, 1918
- Dicraeus Loew, 1873
- Elachiptera Macquart, 1835
- Enderleiniella
- Eribolus Becker, 1910
- Eugaurax
- Gampsocera Schiner, 1862
- Gaurax Loew, 1863
- Goniaspis
- Goniopsita
- Hapleginella Duda, 1933
- Hippelates
- Incertella Sabrosky, 1980
- Lasiambia Sabrosky, 1941
- Lasiochaeta Corti, 1909
- Lasiopleura
- Liohippelates (eye gnats)
- Lipara Meigen, 1830
- Meijerella Sabrosky
- Melanochaeta
- Microcercis Beschovski, 1978
- Monochaetoscinella
- Neoscinella
- Olcella
- Onychaspidium
- Opetiophora
- Oscinella Becker, 1909
- Oscinimorpha Lioy, 1864
- Oscinisoma Lioy, 1864
- Oscinoides
- Polyodaspis Duda, 1933
- Pseudogaurax (parasitic chloropid flies)
- Pseudopachychaeta
- Psilacrum
- Rhodesiella
- Rhopalopterum Duda, 1929
- Sacatonia
- Siphonella Macquart, 1835
- Siphunculina Rondani, 1856
- Speccafrons Sabrosky, 1980
- Stenoscinis
- Trachysiphonella Enderlein, 1936
- Tricimba Lioy, 1864
