= Eusiphona mira =

Scientific classification
- Domain: Eukaryota
- Kingdom: Animalia
- Phylum: Arthropoda
- Class: Insecta
- Order: Diptera
- Family: Milichiidae
- Genus: Eusiphona
- Species: E. mira

Binomial name
- Eusiphona mira Coquillett, 1897

Species of fly

Eusiphona mira is a species of freeloader flies in the family Milichiidae.
