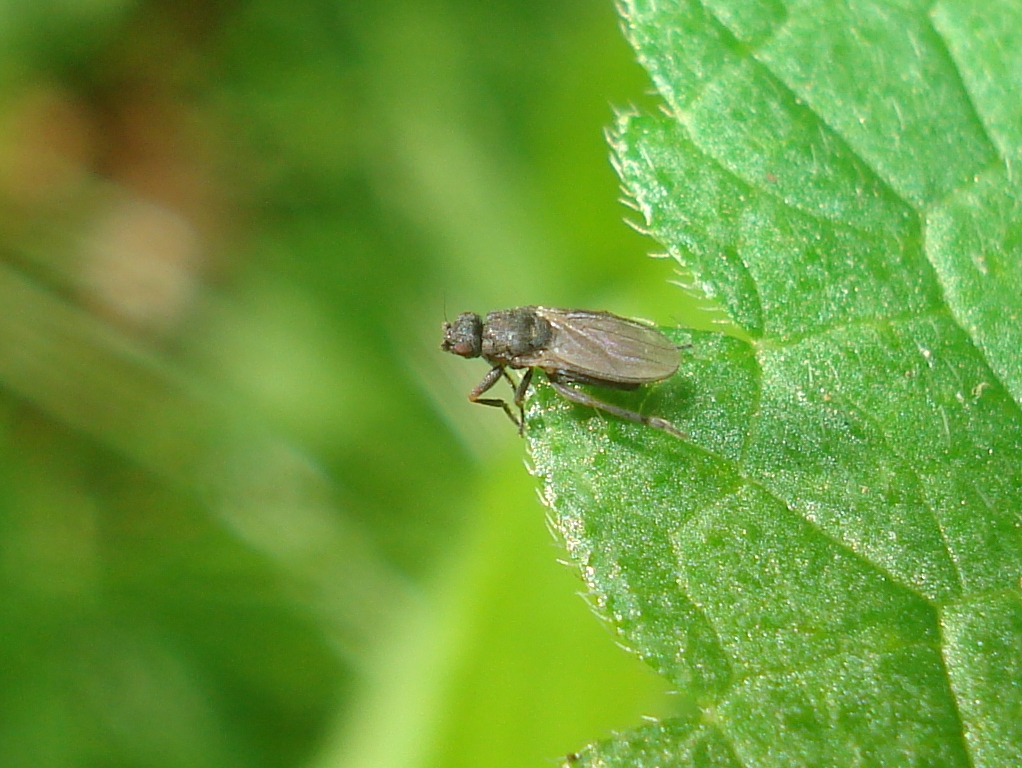

Scientific classification
- Kingdom: Animalia
- Phylum: Arthropoda
- Class: Insecta
- Order: Diptera
- Superfamily: Carnoidea
- Family: Milichiidae
- Subfamily: Madizinae
- Genus: Desmometopa; Loew, 1866

= Desmometopa =

Genus of flies

Desmometopa is a genus of freeloader flies in the family Milichiidae. There are more than 50 described species in Desmometopa.

== Species ==
These 53 species belong to the genus Desmometopa:

- Parectecephala aristalis (Coquillett, 1898)
- Parectecephala dissimilis (Malloch, 1914)
- Desmometopa aczeli Sabrosky, 1983
- Desmometopa aldabrae Sabrosky, 1983
- Desmometopa argentinica Sabrosky, 1983
- Desmometopa atypica Sabrosky, 1983
- Desmometopa blantoni Sabrosky, 1983
- Desmometopa brachycephala Brake & Freidberg, 2003
- Desmometopa ciliata Hendel, 1919
- Desmometopa discipalpis Papp, 1993
- Desmometopa dolichocephala Brake & Freidberg, 2003
- Desmometopa evanescens Sabrosky, 1983
- Desmometopa flavicornis Brake & Freidberg, 2003
- Desmometopa flavicoxa Hendel, 1932
- Desmometopa flavipalpis Sabrosky, 1983
- Desmometopa floridensis Sabrosky, 1983
- Desmometopa glabrifrons (Sabrosky, 1965)
- Desmometopa glandulifera Brake & Freidberg, 2003
- Desmometopa glaucanota Sabrosky, 1983
- Desmometopa gressitti Sabrosky, 1983
- Desmometopa inaurata Lamb, 1914
- Desmometopa indistincta Sabrosky, 1983
- Desmometopa interfrontalis Sabrosky, 1965
- Desmometopa kandyensis Sabrosky, 1983
- Desmometopa latigena (Sabrosky, 1930)
- Desmometopa leptometopoides Sabrosky, 1983
- Desmometopa lucidifrons Sabrosky, 1983
- Desmometopa magnicornis Sabrosky, 1983
- Desmometopa melanderi Sabrosky, 1983
- Desmometopa meridionalis Sabrosky, 1983
- Desmometopa microps Lamb, 1914
- Desmometopa m-nigrum (Zetterstedt, 1848)
- Desmometopa nearctica Sabrosky, 1983
- Desmometopa nigeriae Sabrosky, 1983
- Desmometopa nigrifemorata Brake & Freidberg, 2003
- Desmometopa nigrohalteralis Sabrosky, 1983
- Desmometopa nudigena Sabrosky, 1983
- Desmometopa obscurifrons Sabrosky, 1983
- Desmometopa palpalia (Wahlberg, 1848)
- Desmometopa parafacialis Sabrosky, 1983
- Desmometopa philippinensis Sabrosky, 1983
- Desmometopa pleuralis Sabrosky, 1983
- Desmometopa postorbitalis Sabrosky, 1983
- Desmometopa propeciliata Sabrosky, 1983
- Desmometopa sabroskyi Brake & Freidberg, 2003
- Desmometopa saguaro Sabrosky, 1983
- Desmometopa singaporensis Kertész, 1899
- Desmometopa sordida (Fallén, 1820)
- Desmometopa srilankae Sabrosky, 1983
- Desmometopa stilbopleura Sabrosky, 1983
- Desmometopa tarsalis Loew, 1866
- Desmometopa terminalis Sabrosky, 1983
- Desmometopa tristicula Hendel, 1914
- Desmometopa varipalpis Malloch, 1927
- Desmometopa woldai Sabrosky, 1983
