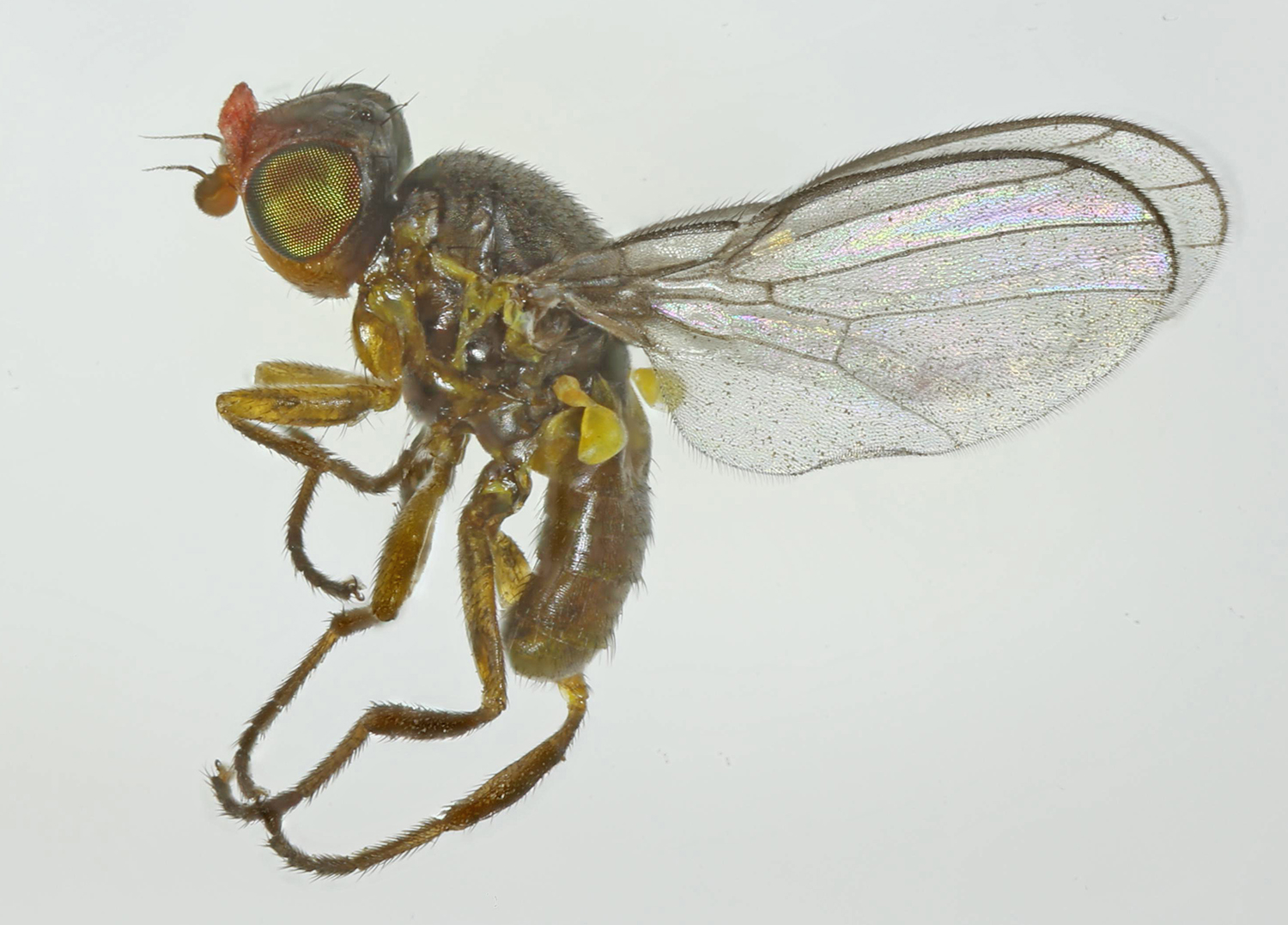
- Dicraeus vagans North Wales

Scientific classification
- Kingdom: Animalia
- Phylum: Arthropoda
- Class: Insecta
- Order: Diptera
- Family: Chloropidae
- Genus: Dicraeus
- Species: D. vagans

Binomial name
- Dicraeus vagans (Meigen, 1838

Synonyms
- Chlorops vagans Meigen, 1838; Oscinis xanthopygus Strobl, 1909

= Dicraeus vagans =

Species of fly

Dicraeus vagans is a species of fly in the family Chloropidae, the grass flies. It is found in the Palearctic. The larva feeds on Bromus.
