= Lipara (disambiguation) =

Lipara is the ancient Greek and Latin name of Lipari, the largest of the Aeolian Islands in Sicily, Italy.

Lipara may also refer to:

- Lipara (fly), a genus of flies
- Lipara (mythology), a figure in Greek mythology
