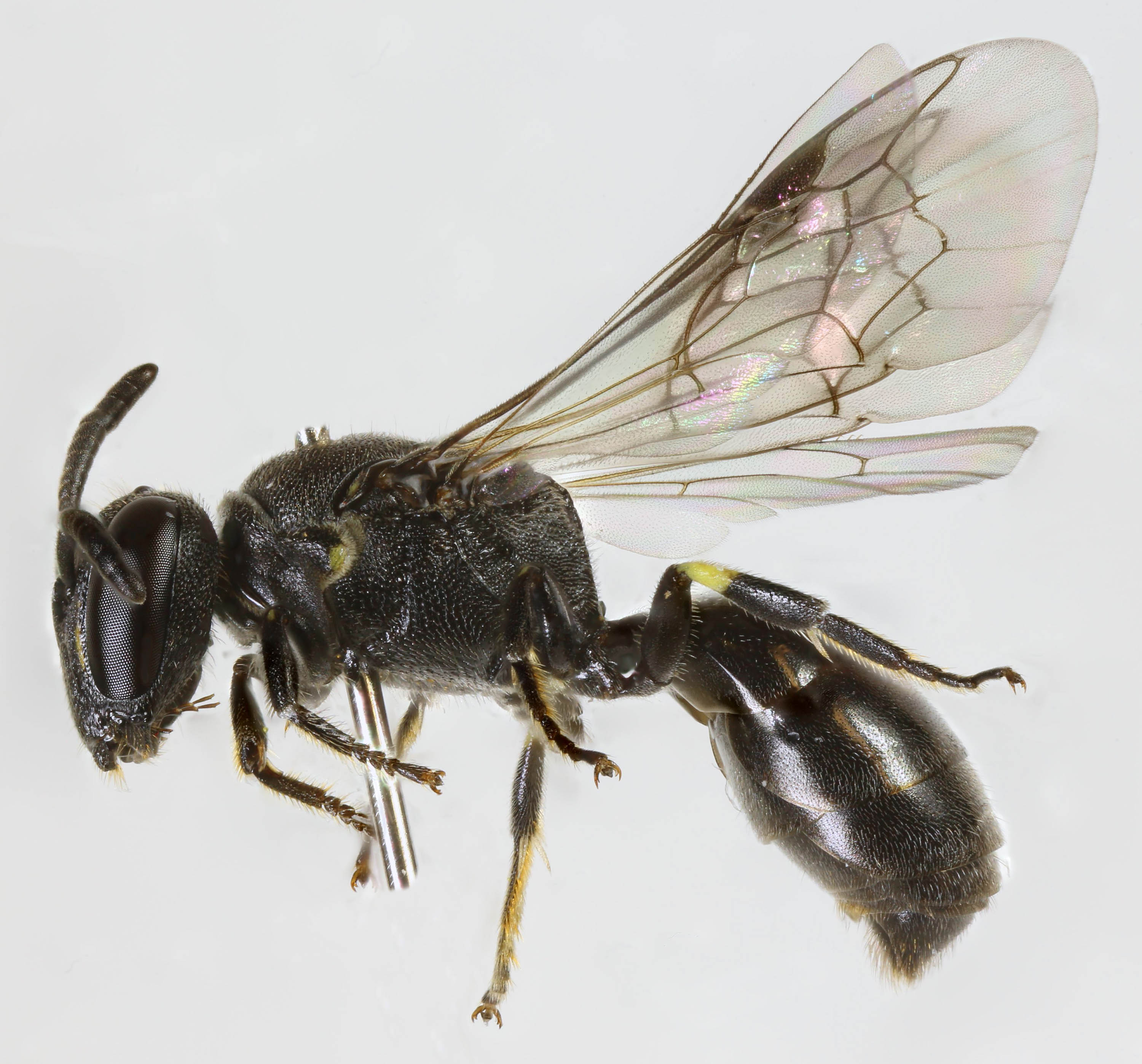
- Hylaeus communis, Fenn's Moss, North Wales

Scientific classification
- Kingdom: Animalia
- Phylum: Arthropoda
- Clade: Pancrustacea
- Class: Insecta
- Order: Hymenoptera
- Family: Colletidae
- Subfamily: Hylaeinae
- Genus: Hylaeus
- Species: H. communis

Binomial name
- Hylaeus communis Nylander, 1852

= Hylaeus communis =

Species of bee

Hylaeus communis is a Palearctic species of solitary bee.

== Description ==
4.5–7 mm. Indistinguishable from other Hylaeus species in the field.

== Range ==
From Portugal through Europe, Asia Minor and the Caucasus to Central Asia; north to Ireland and central Scotland, crosses the Arctic Circle in Scandinavia, in Norway up to 63 ° N, in Sweden up to 66 ° N, in Finland up to 67.5 ° N, in Russia up to Karelia and Kirov. In the south of the distribution area the species was often mixed up with Hylaeus deceptorius (BENOIST, 1959), so that the southern border is not unequivocally established – according to current knowledge, south to Sicily, Crete, Lebanon and northern Iran. Widespread in central Europe, from the plains to the higher elevations of the low mountain ranges and in the Alps. In central Europe very common and most common species of the genus.

== Habitat ==
As a pronounced ubiquist, the species occurs in a wide variety of habitats, both in dry and more humid locations, e.g. along forest edges, on clearings and clearcuts, in field hedges, in blackberry bushes, in sand, gravel and clay pits, on railway embankments, regularly also in residential areas in gardens, parks and on ruderal areas (synanthropic species). From the lowlands to the subalpine altitude.

== Ecology ==
This species is at least partially bivoltine. Flight time from mid or late May to September. A partial second generation flies from early August to September.

Visits flowers and is an extremely polylectic species. The females were observed on the following plant species: Alliaceae: Allium schoenoprasum, Allium sphaerocephalon, Allium porrum, Allium cepa; Apiaceae: Daucus carota, Aegopodium podagraria; Asteraceae: Cirsium arvense, Cirsium vulgare, Achillea millefolium, Achillea filipendulina, Tanacetum vulgare, Solidago canadensis, Leontodon autumnalis; Boraginaceae: Echium vulgare; Brassicaceae: Sinapis arvensis; Campanulaceae: Campanula rotundifolia; Crassulaceae: Sedum rupestre; Lamiaceae: Galeopsis angustifolia; Lythraceae: Lythrum salicaria; Resedaceae: Reseda lutea, Reseda luteola. The males also visit many flowers.

Hylaeus communis nests in existing cavities (insect-feeding tunnels in old wood, abandoned digger wasp nests, mortar joints, cracks in the plastering of house walls, cavities in old window frames); in medullary stems, tendrils and twigs, e.g. Blackberry (Rubus), Elder (Sambucus), Roses (Rosa); in abandoned oak galls by Andricus kollari; in old reed galls of Lipara lucens, also in nesting aids (holes in wood, diameter 2–4 mm. preferably 3 mm; reed stalks).

Narrow-bellied wasps of the genus Gasteruption and ore wasps of the genus Coelopencyrtus were observed as nest parasites. Occasionally adults are attacked by Strepsiptera.

== Etymology ==
From Latin "communis" = "common, common"; this species is one of the most common masked bees.

== Taxonomy ==
Subgenus Hylaeus FABRICIUS, 1793

Synonym: Prosopis annulata var.nigrifacies ALFKEN, 1913
