= Euhalidaya =

Scientific classification
- Kingdom: Animalia
- Phylum: Arthropoda
- Class: Insecta
- Order: Diptera
- Family: Tachinidae
- Subfamily: Exoristinae
- Tribe: Blondeliini
- Genus: Euhalidaya; Walton, 1914

Type species
- Euhalidaya severinii Walton, 1914

Synonyms
- Baculocaptus Cortés, 1968; Clythoxynops Townsend, 1927; Euhalidaya Curran, 1934; Euhalidaya Sabrosky & Arnaud, 1965; Oomeigenia Townsend, 1915; Orphanotrophus Reinhard, 1943

Genus of flies

Euhalidaya is a genus of flies in the family Tachinidae.

== Species ==
- Euhalidaya basalis (Wulp, 1890)
- Euhalidaya chosica (Townsend, 1915)
- Euhalidaya genalis (Coquillett, 1897)
- Euhalidaya orbitalis (Townsend, 1927)
- Euhalidaya valparadisi (Cortés, 1968).
