= Pholeomyia indecora =

Scientific classification
- Domain: Eukaryota
- Kingdom: Animalia
- Phylum: Arthropoda
- Class: Insecta
- Order: Diptera
- Family: Milichiidae
- Genus: Pholeomyia
- Species: P. indecora

Binomial name
- Pholeomyia indecora (Loew, 1869)

Synonyms
- Lobioptera indecora Loew, 1869

Species of fly

Pholeomyia indecora is a species of freeloader fly in the family Milichiidae. It is distributed primarily in southern Canada, but has been reported in Florida, northern Alberta, and Idaho.
