= Leptometopa latipes =

Scientific classification
- Domain: Eukaryota
- Kingdom: Animalia
- Phylum: Arthropoda
- Class: Insecta
- Order: Diptera
- Family: Milichiidae
- Genus: Leptometopa
- Species: L. latipes

Binomial name
- Leptometopa latipes (Meigen, 1830)

Synonyms
- Agromyza latipes Meigen, 1830; Mallochiella orillia Curran, 1927

Species of fly

Leptometopa latipes is a species of freeloader flies in the family Milichiidae.
