= Pseudochaeta argentifrons =

Scientific classification
- Kingdom: Animalia
- Phylum: Arthropoda
- Class: Insecta
- Order: Diptera
- Family: Tachinidae
- Subfamily: Exoristinae
- Tribe: Goniini
- Genus: Pseudochaeta
- Subgenus: Pseudochaeta
- Species: P. argentifrons

Binomial name
- Pseudochaeta argentifrons Coquillett, 1895

Species of fly

Pseudochaeta argentifrons is a genus of flies in the family Tachinidae.

== Distribution ==
Canada, United States
