= Trachysiphonella =

Scientific classification
- Kingdom: Animalia
- Phylum: Arthropoda
- Clade: Pancrustacea
- Class: Insecta
- Order: Diptera
- Family: Chloropidae
- Subfamily: Oscinellinae
- Genus: Trachysiphonella; Enderlein, 1936

Genus of flies

Trachysiphonella is a genus of flies in the family Chloropidae.
