= Siphonella =

Scientific classification
- Kingdom: Animalia
- Phylum: Arthropoda
- Class: Insecta
- Order: Diptera
- Family: Chloropidae
- Subfamily: Oscinellinae
- Genus: Siphonella; Macquart, 1835

Genus of flies

Siphonella is a genus of flies in the family Chloropidae.
