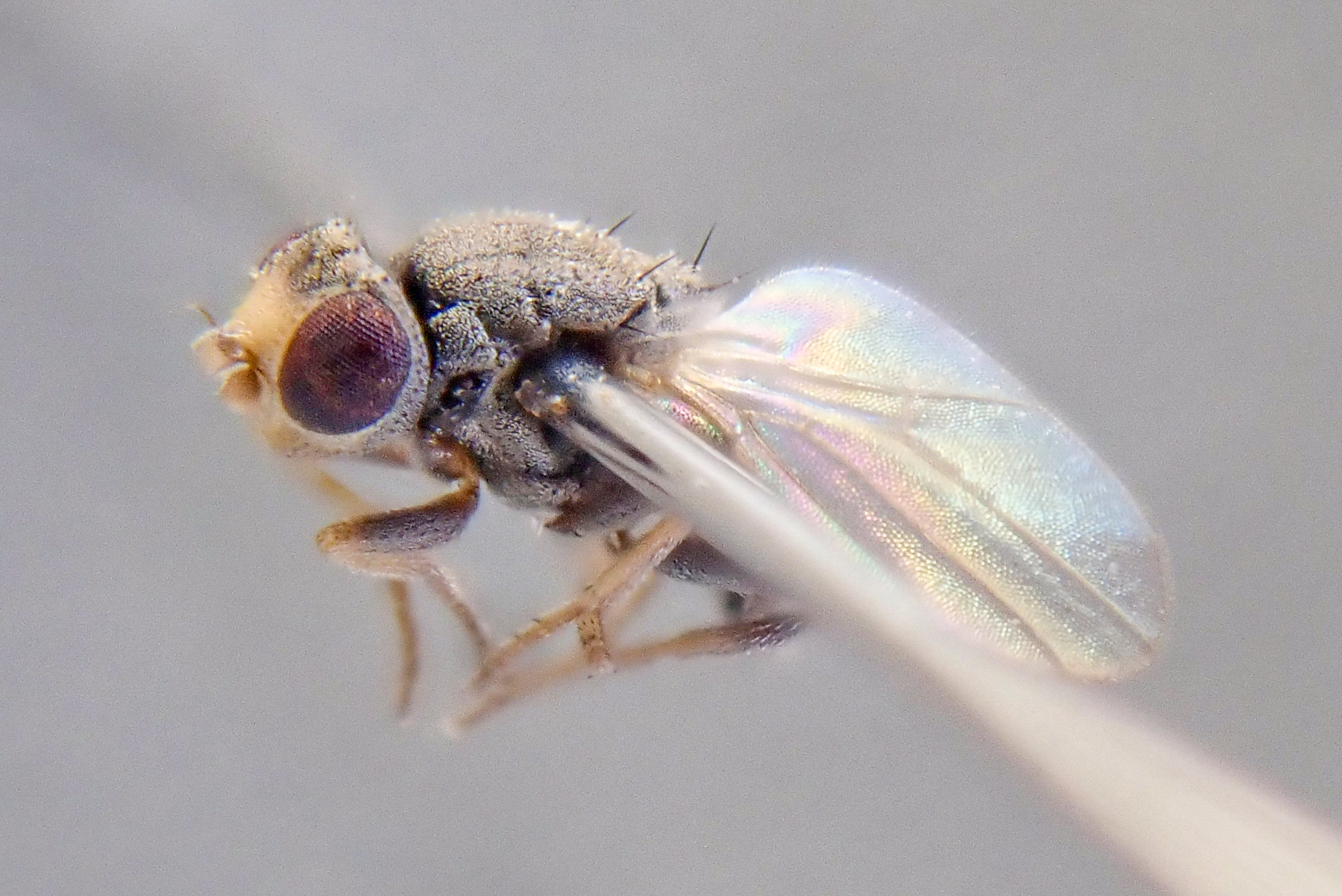
- Male of Aphanotrigonum

Scientific classification
- Kingdom: Animalia
- Phylum: Arthropoda
- Class: Insecta
- Order: Diptera
- Family: Chloropidae
- Subfamily: Oscinellinae
- Genus: Aphanotrigonum; Duda, 1932

= Aphanotrigonum =

Genus of flies

Aphanotrigonum is a genus of frit flies in the family Chloropidae. There are at least 2 described species in Aphanotrigonum.

== Species ==
- Aphanotrigonum darlingtoniae (Jones, 1916)
- Aphanotrigonum scabrum (Aldrich, 1918)
