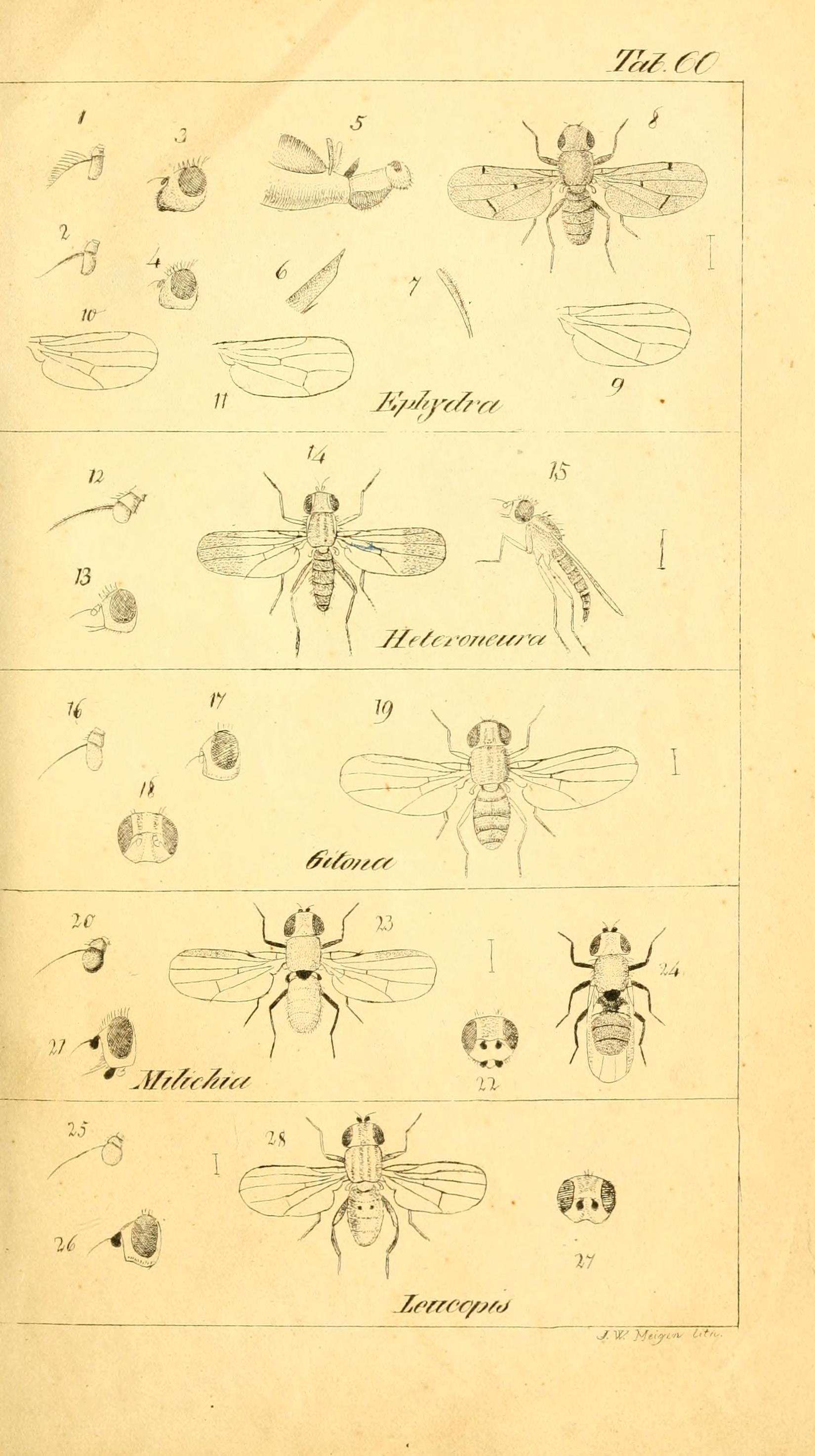
- Milichia in Meigen Systematische Beschreibung der bekannten europäischen zweiflügeligen Insekten

Scientific classification
- Kingdom: Animalia
- Phylum: Arthropoda
- Clade: Pancrustacea
- Class: Insecta
- Order: Diptera
- Family: Milichiidae
- Genus: Milichia; Meigen, 1830

Synonyms
- Lobioptera Wahlberg, 1847; Milichea Lioy, 1864

= Milichia =

Genus of flies

Milichia is a genus of flies belonging to the family Milichiidae.

The genus has cosmopolitan distribution.

== Species ==
Species:

- Milichia aethiops Malloch, 1913
- Milichia albomaculata (Strobl, 1900)
- Milichia angustifrons Bezzi, 1928
