= Ceratobarys =

Scientific classification
- Domain: Eukaryota
- Kingdom: Animalia
- Phylum: Arthropoda
- Class: Insecta
- Order: Diptera
- Family: Chloropidae
- Subfamily: Oscinellinae
- Genus: Ceratobarys; Coquillett, 1898

Genus of flies

Ceratobarys is a genus of frit flies in the family Chloropidae. There is one described species in Ceratobarys, C. eulophus.
