= Leptometopa =

Scientific classification
- Domain: Eukaryota
- Kingdom: Animalia
- Phylum: Arthropoda
- Class: Insecta
- Order: Diptera
- Family: Milichiidae
- Subfamily: Madizinae
- Genus: Leptometopa; Becker, 1903

Genus of flies

Leptometopa is a genus of freeloader flies in the family Milichiidae. There are about 19 described species in Leptometopa.

== Species ==
These 19 species belong to the genus Leptometopa:

- Leptometopa aelleni Papp, 1978
- Leptometopa albipennis (Lamb, 1914)
- Leptometopa beardsleyi Hardy & Delfinado, 1980
- Leptometopa broersei Meijere, 1946
- Leptometopa coquilletti (Hendel, 1907)
- Leptometopa flaviceps (Enderlein, 1934)
- Leptometopa halteralis (Coquillett, 1900)
- Leptometopa kaszabi Papp, 1976
- Leptometopa lacteipennis (Hendel, 1913)
- Leptometopa latipes (Meigen, 1830)
- Leptometopa mallochi Sabrosky, 1989
- Leptometopa matilei Sabrosky, 1978
- Leptometopa mcclurei Sabrosky, 1964
- Leptometopa nilssoni Sabrosky, 1987
- Leptometopa niveipennis (Strobl, 1898)
- Leptometopa pacifica Papp, 1984
- Leptometopa pecki Papp, 1984
- Leptometopa rufifrons Becker, 1903
- Leptometopa veracildae Mello, Rodrigues & Lamas, 2007
