= Microcercis =

Scientific classification
- Kingdom: Animalia
- Phylum: Arthropoda
- Class: Insecta
- Order: Diptera
- Family: Chloropidae
- Subfamily: Oscinellinae
- Genus: Microcercis; Beschovski, 1978

Genus of flies

Microcercis is a genus of flies in the family Chloropidae.

== Species ==
- Microcercis albipalpis (Meigen, 1830)
- Microcercis bispina (Malloch, 2024)
- Microcercis dorsata (Foster, 2024)
- Microcercis infesta (Becker, 2024)
- Microcercis insularis (Malloch, 2024)
- Microcercis johanni Foster, 2024
- Microcercis laytoni Foster, 2024
- Microcercis minor (Foster, 2024)
- Microcercis murphyi Foster, 2024
- Microcercis trifeminarum Foster, 2024
