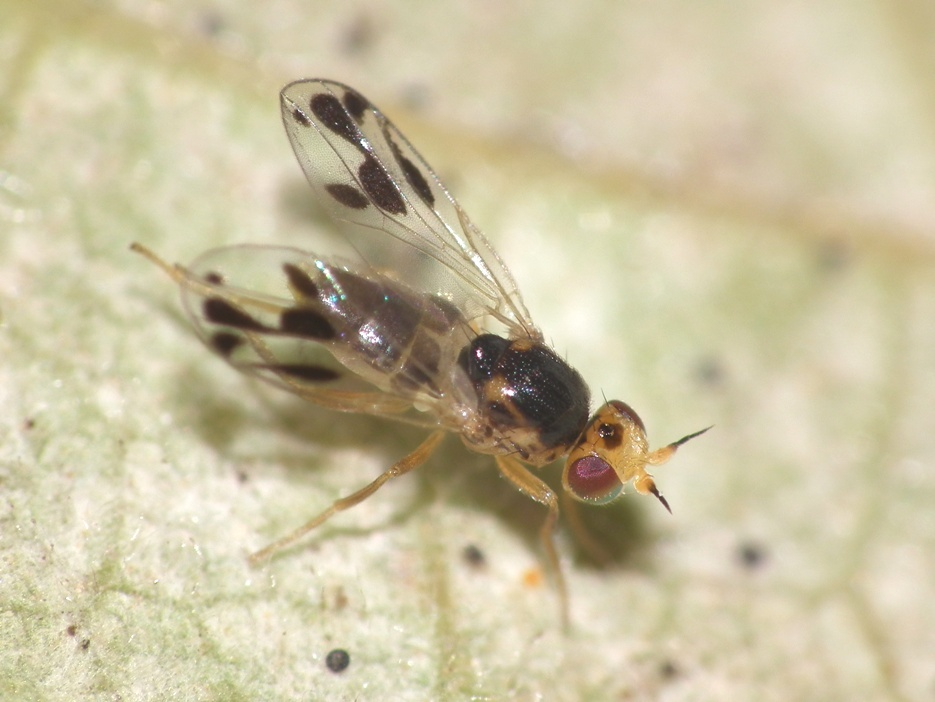
- Gampsocera numerata

Scientific classification
- Domain: Eukaryota
- Kingdom: Animalia
- Phylum: Arthropoda
- Class: Insecta
- Order: Diptera
- Family: Chloropidae
- Subfamily: Oscinellinae
- Genus: Gampsocera; Schiner, 1862

= Gampsocera =

Genus of flies

Gampsocera is a genus of flies in the family Chloropidae.
