= Metopiops =

Scientific classification
- Kingdom: Animalia
- Phylum: Arthropoda
- Class: Insecta
- Order: Diptera
- Family: Tachinidae
- Subfamily: Exoristinae
- Tribe: Goniini
- Genus: Pseudochaeta
- Subgenus: Metopiops; Townsend, 1912

Type species
- Metopiops mirabilis Townsend, 1912

Genus of flies

Metopiops is a subgenus of flies in the family Tachinidae.

== Species ==
- Pseudochaeta mirabilis (Townsend, 1912)
- Pseudochaeta pyralidis Coquillett, 1897
