= Eribolus =

Scientific classification
- Kingdom: Animalia
- Phylum: Arthropoda
- Class: Insecta
- Order: Diptera
- Family: Chloropidae
- Subfamily: Oscinellinae
- Genus: Eribolus

Genus of flies

Eribolus is a genus of frit flies in the family Chloropidae. There are at least 4 described species in Eribolus.

== Species ==
- Eribolus californicus Sabrosky, 1950
- Eribolus longulus (Loew, 1863)
- Eribolus nana (Zetterstedt, 1838)
- Eribolus nearacticus (Sabrosky, 1948)
