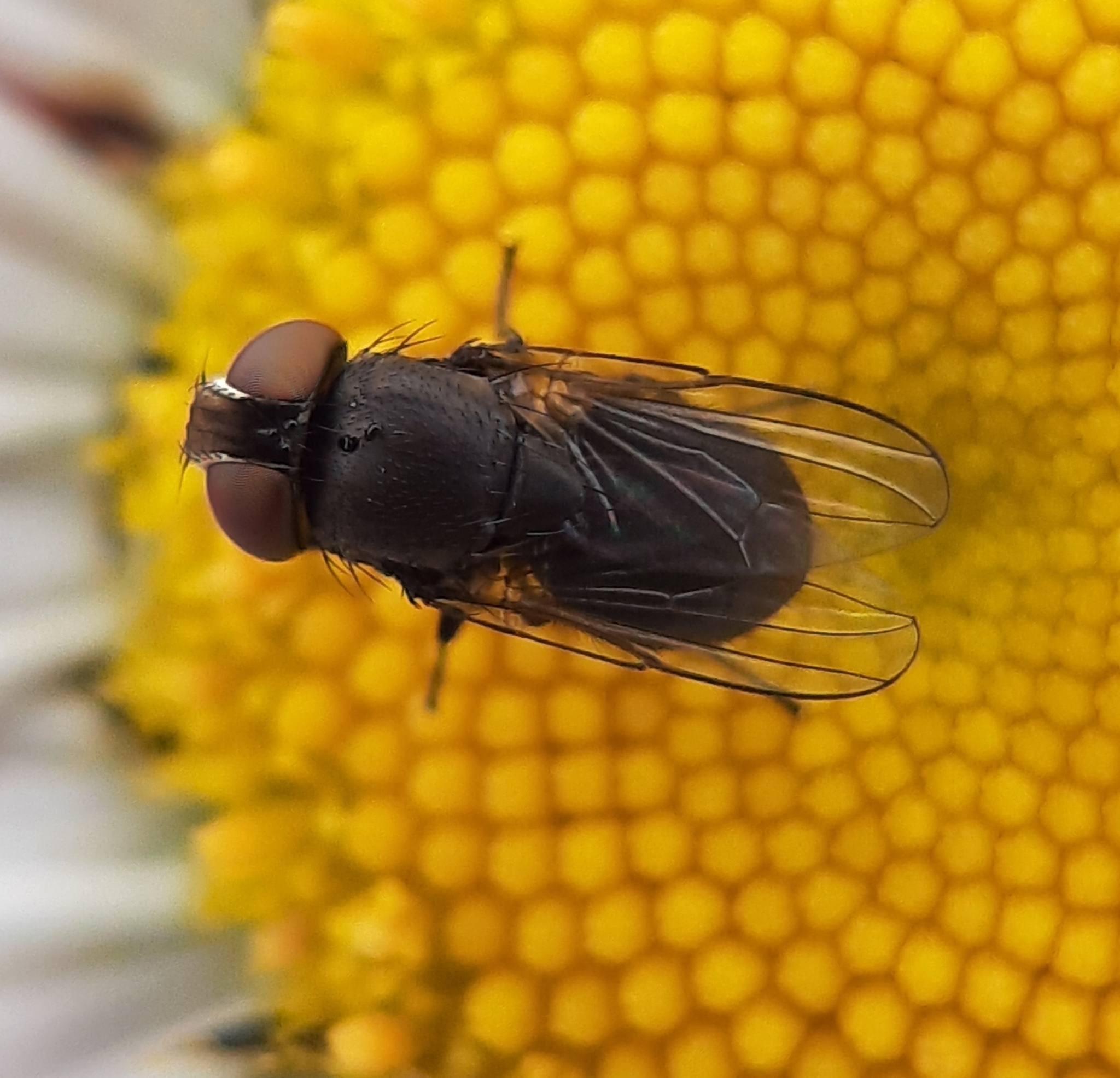

Scientific classification
- Domain: Eukaryota
- Kingdom: Animalia
- Phylum: Arthropoda
- Class: Insecta
- Order: Diptera
- Family: Milichiidae
- Subfamily: Milichiinae
- Genus: Eusiphona; Coquillett, 1897

= Eusiphona =

Genus of flies

Eusiphona is a genus of freeloader flies in the family Milichiidae. There are at least four described species in Eusiphona.

== Species ==
These four species belong to the genus Eusiphona:

- Eusiphona cooperi Sabrosky, 1955
- Eusiphona flava Sabrosky, 1953
- Eusiphona mira Coquillett, 1897
- Eusiphona vittata Sabrosky, 1982
