= Phaenopsis =

Scientific classification
- Kingdom: Animalia
- Phylum: Arthropoda
- Class: Insecta
- Order: Diptera
- Family: Tachinidae
- Subfamily: Exoristinae
- Tribe: Goniini
- Genus: Pseudochaeta
- Subgenus: Phaenopsis; Townsend, 1912

Type species
- Phaenopsis arabella Townsend, 1912

Genus of flies

Phaenopsis is a subgenus of flies in the family Tachinidae.

== Species ==
- Pseudochaeta arabella (Townsend, 1912)
- Pseudochaeta venusta (Reinhard, 1946)
