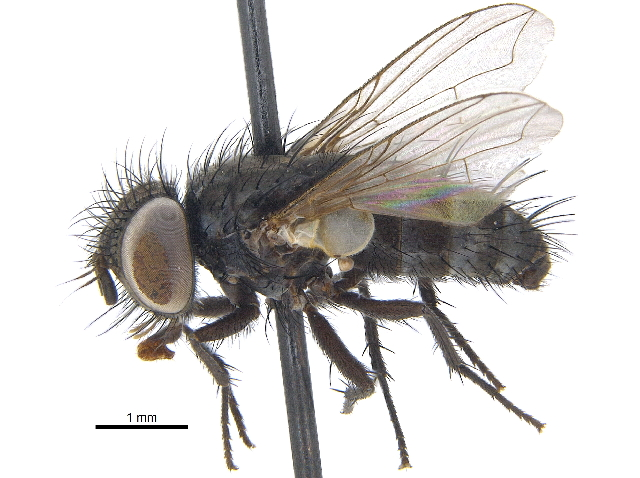

Scientific classification
- Kingdom: Animalia
- Phylum: Arthropoda
- Class: Insecta
- Order: Diptera
- Family: Tachinidae
- Subfamily: Exoristinae
- Tribe: Blondeliini
- Genus: Euhalidaya
- Species: E. genalis

Binomial name
- Euhalidaya genalis (Coquillett, 1897)

Synonyms
- Biomyia genalis Coquillett, 1897; Euhallidaya severinii Walton, 1914; Orphanotrophus orbitalis Reinhard, 1943

= Euhalidaya genalis =

Species of fly

Euhalidaya genalis is a species of fly in the family Tachinidae.

== Distribution ==
United States, Canada.
