= Liohippelates =

Scientific classification
- Kingdom: Animalia
- Phylum: Arthropoda
- Class: Insecta
- Order: Diptera
- Family: Chloropidae
- Subfamily: Oscinellinae
- Genus: Liohippelates

Genus of flies

Liohippelates is a genus of eye gnats in the family Chloropidae. There are about 11 described species in Liohippelates.

== Species ==
- Liohippelates apicatus (Malloch, 1913)
- Liohippelates bicolor (Coquillett, 1898)
- Liohippelates bishoppi (Sabrosky, 1941)
- Liohippelates collusor (Townsend, 1895)
- Liohippelates currani (Aldrich, 1931)
- Liohippelates flaviceps (Loew, 1863)
- Liohippelates flavipes (Loew, 1866)
- Liohippelates pallipes (Loew, 1863)
- Liohippelates peruanus (Becker, 1912)
- Liohippelates pusio (Loew, 1872)
- Liohippelates robertsoni (Sabrosky, 1941)
