= Melanochaeta (fly) =

Scientific classification
- Kingdom: Animalia
- Phylum: Arthropoda
- Clade: Pancrustacea
- Class: Insecta
- Order: Diptera
- Family: Chloropidae
- Subfamily: Oscinellinae
- Tribe: Elachipterini
- Genus: Melanochaeta; Bezzi, 1906

Genus of flies

Melanochaeta is a genus of flies in the family Chloropidae.
