= Rhopalopterum =

Scientific classification
- Kingdom: Animalia
- Phylum: Arthropoda
- Class: Insecta
- Order: Diptera
- Family: Chloropidae
- Subfamily: Oscinellinae
- Genus: Rhopalopterum

Genus of flies

Rhopalopterum is a genus of frit flies in the family Chloropidae. There are about 10 described species in Rhopalopterum.

== Species ==
- Rhopalopterum atriceps (Loew, 1863)
- Rhopalopterum beameri (Sabrosky, 1940)
- Rhopalopterum carbonaria (Loew, 1869)
- Rhopalopterum criddlei (Aldrich, 1918)
- Rhopalopterum limitatum (Becker, 1912)
- Rhopalopterum luteiceps (Sabrosky, 1940)
- Rhopalopterum nudiusculum (Loew, 1863)
- Rhopalopterum painteri (Sabrosky, 1940)
- Rhopalopterum soror (Macquart, 1851)
- Rhopalopterum umbrosa (Loew, 1863)
