= Eugaurax =

Scientific classification
- Kingdom: Animalia
- Phylum: Arthropoda
- Class: Insecta
- Order: Diptera
- Family: Chloropidae
- Subfamily: Oscinellinae
- Genus: Eugaurax

Genus of flies

Eugaurax is a genus of frit flies in the family Chloropidae.
