= Pholeomyia =

Scientific classification
- Kingdom: Animalia
- Phylum: Arthropoda
- Clade: Pancrustacea
- Class: Insecta
- Order: Diptera
- Family: Milichiidae
- Subfamily: Milichiinae
- Genus: Pholeomyia; Bilimek, 1867

Genus of flies

Pholeomyia is a genus of freeloader flies in the family Milichiidae. There are more than 30 described species in Pholeomyia.

== Species ==
These 39 species belong to the genus Pholeomyia:

- Pholeomyia aequatoralis Seguy, 1934
- Pholeomyia anomala Hendel, 1933
- Pholeomyia anthracina (Becker, 1907)
- Pholeomyia argyrata Hendel, 1932
- Pholeomyia argyrophenga (Schiner, 1868)
- Pholeomyia comans Sabrosky, 1959
- Pholeomyia dampfi Sabrosky, 1959
- Pholeomyia decorior Steyskal, 1943
- Pholeomyia dispar (Becker, 1907)
- Pholeomyia excelsior (Becker, 1907)
- Pholeomyia expansa Aldrich, 1925
- Pholeomyia fasciventris (Becker, 1907)
- Pholeomyia hurdi Sabrosky, 1959
- Pholeomyia implicata (Becker, 1907)
- Pholeomyia indecora (Loew, 1869)
- Pholeomyia insecta (Becker, 1907)
- Pholeomyia latifrons Sabrosky, 1959
- Pholeomyia leucogastra (Loew, 1861)
- Pholeomyia leucozona Bilimek, 1867
- Pholeomyia longifacies Hendel, 1933
- Pholeomyia longiseta (Becker, 1907)
- Pholeomyia myopa Melander, 1913
- Pholeomyia nigricosta (Hendel, 1932)
- Pholeomyia nitidula Sabrosky, 1959
- Pholeomyia obscura Sabrosky, 1959
- Pholeomyia palparis (Becker, 1907)
- Pholeomyia pectoralis Hendel, 1932
- Pholeomyia politifacies Sabrosky, 1959
- Pholeomyia praeocellaris Hendel, 1932
- Pholeomyia praesecta (Becker, 1907)
- Pholeomyia prominens (Becker, 1907)
- Pholeomyia pseudodecora (Becker, 1907)
- Pholeomyia quadrifasciata Hendel, 1932
- Pholeomyia robertsoni (Coquillett, 1902)
- Pholeomyia schineri (Hendel, 1932)
- Pholeomyia schnusei (Becker, 1907)
- Pholeomyia sororcula (Becker, 1907)
- Pholeomyia texensis Sabrosky, 1959
- Pholeomyia vockerothi Sabrosky, 1961
