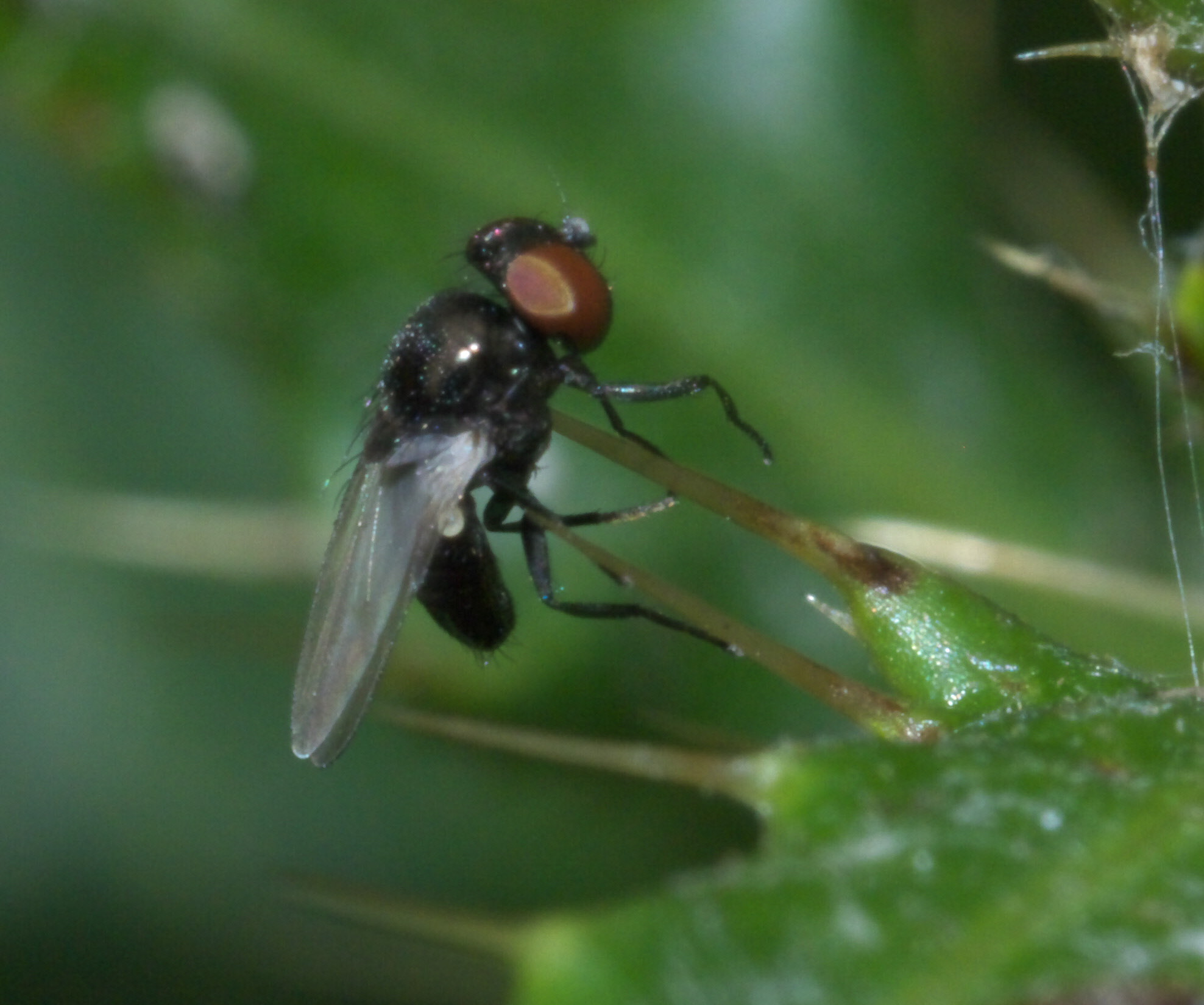

Scientific classification
- Domain: Eukaryota
- Kingdom: Animalia
- Phylum: Arthropoda
- Class: Insecta
- Order: Diptera
- Family: Milichiidae
- Subfamily: Milichiinae
- Genus: Milichiella

= Milichiella =

Genus of flies

Milichiella is a genus of freeloader flies in the family Milichiidae.

== Species ==
=== Aethiops ===
- Milichiella aethiops (Malloch, 1913)
- Milichiella mexicana Brake, 2009
- Milichiella opuntiae Brake, 2009
- Milichiella pachycerei Brake, 2009
- Milichiella peyotei Brake, 2009
- Milichiella pseudopuntiae Brake, 2009
- Milichiella santacatalinae Brake, 2009

=== Argentea ===
- Milichiella aldabrae Brake, 2009
- Milichiella argentea (Fabricius, 1805)
- Milichiella angolae Brake, 2009
- Milichiella argentiventris Hendel, 1931
- Milichiella argyrogaster (Perris, 1876)
- Milichiella asiatica Brake, 2009
- Milichiella bakeri Aldrich, 1931
- Milichiella bimaculata Becker, 1907
- Milichiella christmas Brake, 2009
- Milichiella circularis Aldrich, 1931
- Milichiella formosae Brake, 2009
- Milichiella javana de Meijere, 1911
- Milichiella lacteiventris Malloch, 1931
- Milichiella longiseta Hardy & Delfinado, 1980
- Milichiella melaleuca (Loew, 1863)
- Milichiella nigella Iwasa, 2011
- Milichiella nigeriae Duda, 1935
- Milichiella nigripes Malloch, 1931
- Milichiella pseudodectes (Séguy, 1933)
- Milichiella quintargentea Brake, 2009
- Milichiella solitaria (Lamb, 1914)
- Milichiella spinthera Hendel, 1913
- Milichiella sterkstrooma Brake, 2009
- Milichiella sulawesiensis Iwasa, 2011
- Milichiella sumptuosa de Meijere, 1911
- Milichiella tiefii (Mik, 1887)
- Milichiella tosi Becker, 1907
- Milichiella triangula Brake, 2009
- Milichiella ugandae Brake, 2009
- Milichiella unicolor (de Meijere, 1906)

=== Chilensis ===
- Milichiella breviarista Brake, 2009
- Milichiella chilensis Brake, 2009
- Milichiella conventa Brake, 2009

=== Cinerea ===
- Milichiella cavernae Brake, 2009
- Milichiella cinerea (Coquillett, 1900)
- Milichiella urbana Malloch, 1913

=== Dimidata ===
- Milichiella cingulata Becker, 1907
- Milichiella dimidiata (Wiedemann, 1830)

=== Faviformis ===
- Milichiella brevirostris Brake, 2009
- Milichiella faviformis Brake, 2009
- Milichiella longirostris Brake, 2009
- Milichiella mojingae Brake, 2009
- Milichiella variata Brake, 2009
- Milichiella virginae Brake, 2009
- Milichiella zaiziksensis Brake, 2009

=== Frontalis ===
- Milichiella concavum (Becker, 1907)
- Milichiella frontalis (Becker, 1907)
- Milichiella montanum (Becker, 1907)

=== Lacteipennis ===
- Milichiella arcuata (Loew, 1876)
- Milichiella argenteocincta Johnson, 1919
- Milichiella bisignata Melander, 1913
- Milichiella lacteipennis (Loew, 1876)
- Milichiella lucidula Becker, 1907
- Milichiella rugosistyla Brake, 2009
- Milichiella striata Brake, 2009
- Milichiella villarricae Brake, 2009

=== Mollis ===
- Milichiella badia Brake, 2009
- Milichiella booloombae Brake, 2009
- Milichiella cooloolae Brake, 2009
- Milichiella mollis Brake, 2009
- Milichiella multisetae Brake, 2009

=== Nudiventris ===
- Milichiella nudiventris Becker, 1907
- Milichiella turrialbae Brake, 2009

=== Poecilogastra ===
- Milichiella boliviana Brake, 2009
- Milichiella maculatiradii Brake, 2009
- Milichiella metallica Brake, 2009
- Milichiella poecilogastra (Becker, 1907)

=== Ungrouped ===
- Milichiella abditoargentea Brake, 2009
- Milichiella aberrata Becker, 1907
- Milichiella acantha Brake, 2009
- Milichiella aeroplana Brake, 2009
- Milichiella anterogrisea Brake, 2009
- Milichiella argenteidorsa Brake, 2009
- Milichiella argentinae Brake, 2009
- Milichiella bella Brake, 2009
- Milichiella bermaguiensis Brake, 2009
- Milichiella bruneiensis Brake, 2009
- Milichiella chocolata Brake, 2009
- Milichiella cochiseae Brake, 2009
- Milichiella dominicae Brake, 2009
- Milichiella flavilunulae Brake, 2009
- Milichiella flaviventris Brake, 2009
- Milichiella fusciventris Brake, 2009
- Milichiella griseomacula Brake, 2009
- Milichiella hendeli Brake, 2000
- Milichiella iberica Carles-Tolrá, 2001
- Milichiella inbio Brake, 2009
- Milichiella jamaicensi Brake, 2009
- Milichiella laselvae Brake, 2009
- Milichiella lasuizae Brake, 2009
- Milichiella madagascarensis Brake, 2009
- Milichiella mathisi Brake, 2009
- Milichiella novateutoniae Brake, 2009
- Milichiella parva (Macquart, 1843)
- Milichiella plaumanni Brake, 2009
- Milichiella proclinata Brake, 2009
- Milichiella punctata Brake, 2009
- Milichiella rufa Brake, 2009
- Milichiella rutila Brake, 2009
- Milichiella sculpta Brake, 2009
- Milichiella tricincta Becker, 1907
- Milichiella trisetae Brake, 2009
- Milichiella tristis Becker, 1907
- Milichiella velutina Becker, 1907
- Milichiella vidua Becker, 1907
- Milichiella weejasperensis Brake, 2009
