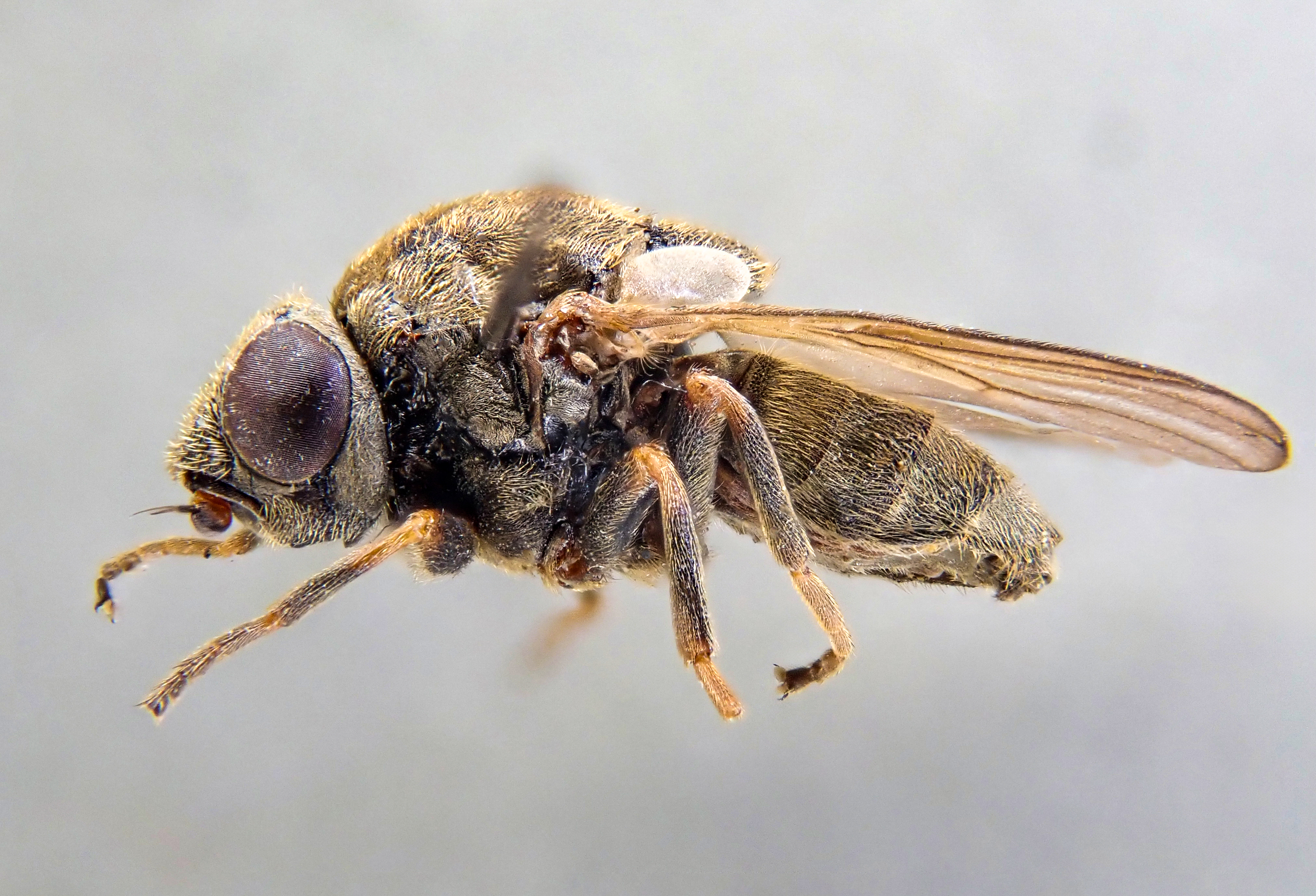
- Lipara lucens, ex galls on Phragmites

Scientific classification
- Kingdom: Animalia
- Phylum: Arthropoda
- Class: Insecta
- Order: Diptera
- Family: Chloropidae
- Subfamily: Oscinellinae
- Genus: Lipara; Meigen, 1830

= Lipara (fly) =

Genus of flies

Lipara is a genus of flies in the family Chloropidae. Among the Palearctic species, a specific community of bees and wasps make their nests in the galls of chloropid flies. Most frequently, they use the galls induced by Lipara lucens on common reed stems. Some of these aculeate hymenopteran species, such as the digger wasp Pemphredon fabricii (Crabronidae) or the solitary bee Hylaeus pectoralis (Colletidae) are specialized for nesting in galls induced by Lipara spp. more than a year ago.

== Species ==
Described species:

- Lipara australis Malloch, 1940
- Lipara baltica Karpa, 1978
- Lipara brevipilosa Nartshuk, 1976
- Lipara frigida Kanmiya, 1982
- Lipara japonica Kanmiya, 1982
- Lipara lucens Meigen, 1830
- Lipara orientalis Nartshuk, 1977
- Lipara pullitarsis Doskočil & Chvála, 1971
- Lipara rufitarsis Loew, 1858
- Lipara salina Nartshuk & Kanmiya, 1996

== Sources ==
- Bogusch, P; Astapenková, A; Heneberg, P (2015). "Larvae and Nests of Six Aculeate Hymenoptera (Hymenoptera: Aculeata) Nesting in Reed Galls Induced by Lipara spp. (Diptera: Chloropidae) with a Review of Species Recorded" (PDF). PLOS ONE. 10 (6) e0130802. Bibcode:2015PLoSO..1030802B. doi:10.1371/journal.pone.0130802. PMC 4482587. PMID 26114290.
