= Paramyia =

Scientific classification
- Domain: Eukaryota
- Kingdom: Animalia
- Phylum: Arthropoda
- Class: Insecta
- Order: Diptera
- Family: Milichiidae
- Subfamily: Phyllomyzinae
- Genus: Paramyia; Williston, 1897

Genus of flies

Paramyia is a genus of freeloader flies in the family Milichiidae. There are about 18 described species in Paramyia.

== Species ==
These 18 species belong to the genus Paramyia:

- Paramyia africana Papp, 2001
- Paramyia flagellomera Papp, 2001
- Paramyia flava Papp, 2001
- Paramyia formosana Papp, 2001
- Paramyia fumipennis Malloch, 1934
- Paramyia hungarica Papp, 1993
- Paramyia inconspicua Meijere, 1916
- Paramyia latigena Papp, 2001
- Paramyia longilingua Papp, 2001
- Paramyia minuscula Papp, 2001
- Paramyia nigra Williston, 1897
- Paramyia nitens (Loew, 1869)
- Paramyia nitida Papp, 2001
- Paramyia palpalis Papp, 2001
- Paramyia regalis Papp, 2001
- Paramyia setitarsalis Papp & Swann, 2001
- Paramyia swanni Papp, 2001
- Paramyia triangularis Papp, 2001
