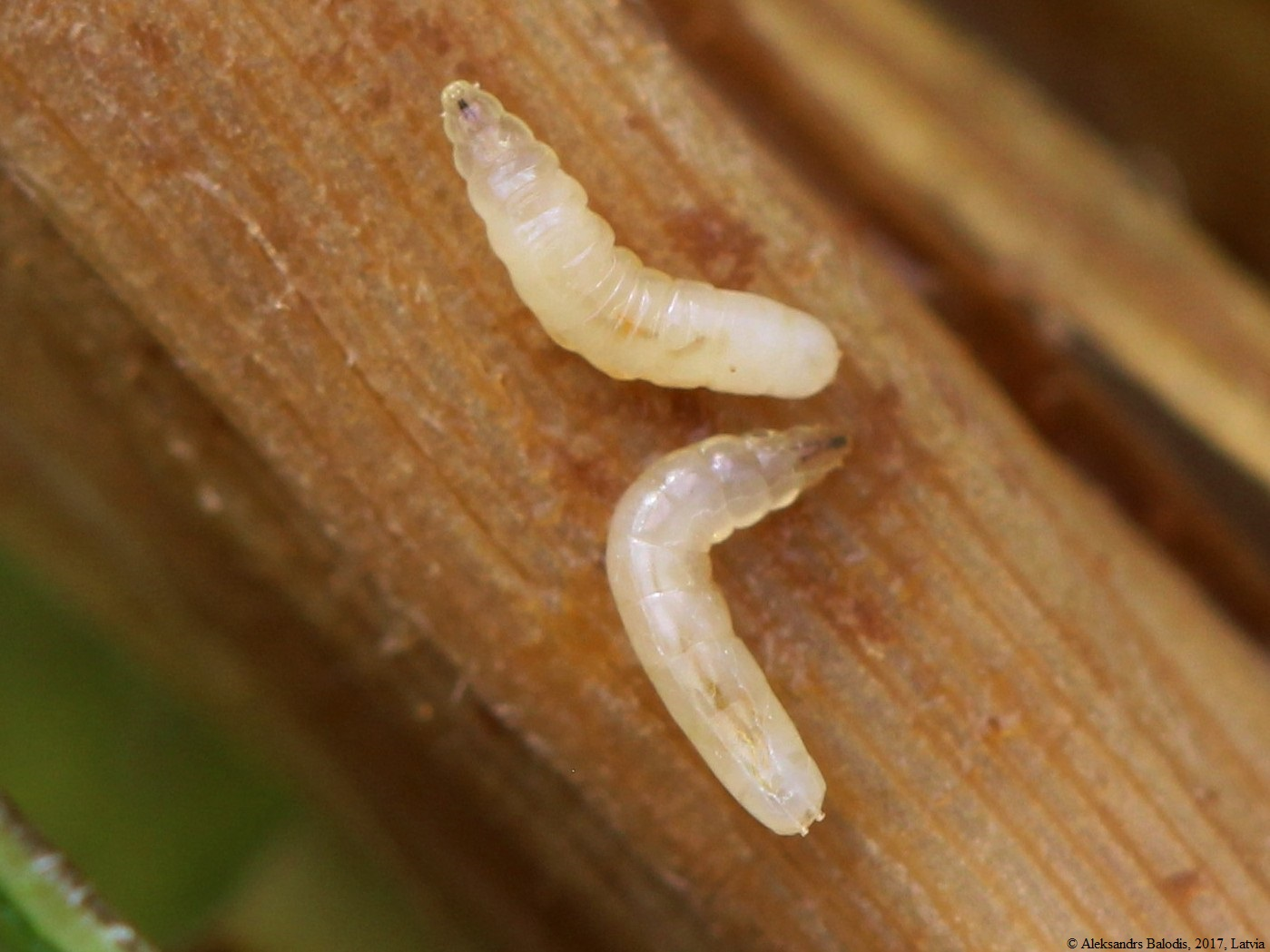

Scientific classification
- Domain: Eukaryota
- Kingdom: Animalia
- Phylum: Arthropoda
- Class: Insecta
- Order: Diptera
- Family: Chloropidae
- Genus: Lipara
- Species: L. lucens

Binomial name
- Lipara lucens Meigen, 1830

= Lipara lucens =

Species of insect found in Europe

Lipara lucens is a species of frit fly in the family Chloropidae. It is found in Europe. It forms galls on Phragmites australis plants.
