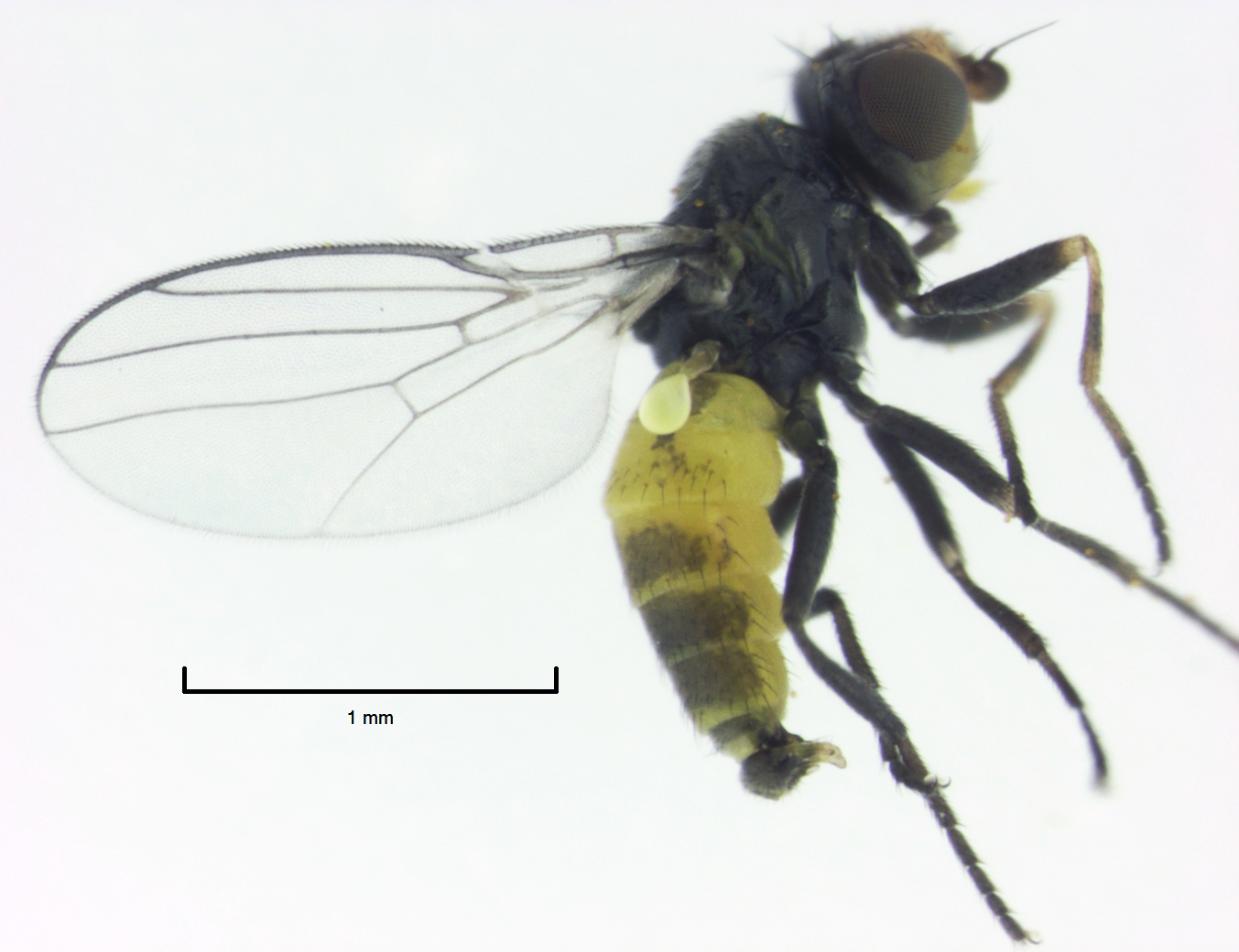
- Dicraeus tibialis (Macquart, 1835). Adult male.

Scientific classification
- Kingdom: Animalia
- Phylum: Arthropoda
- Clade: Pancrustacea
- Class: Insecta
- Order: Diptera
- Family: Chloropidae
- Subfamily: Oscinellinae
- Genus: Dicraeus; Loew, 1873

= Dicraeus =

Genus of flies

Dicraeus is a genus of flies in the family Chloropidae.
