= Phyllomyza =

Scientific classification
- Domain: Eukaryota
- Kingdom: Animalia
- Phylum: Arthropoda
- Class: Insecta
- Order: Diptera
- Family: Milichiidae
- Subfamily: Phyllomyzinae
- Genus: Phyllomyza; Fallén, 1810

Genus of flies

Phyllomyza is a genus of freeloader flies in the family Milichiidae. There are at least 30 described species in Phyllomyza.

== Species ==
These 34 species belong to the genus Phyllomyza:

- Phyllomyza aelleni Papp, 1984^{c g}
- Phyllomyza amamiensis Iwasa, 2003^{c g}
- Phyllomyza beckeri Kramer, 1920^{c g}
- Phyllomyza cavernae Meijere, 1914^{c g}
- Phyllomyza clavellata^{g}
- Phyllomyza claviconis Yang, 1998^{c g}
- Phyllomyza dilatata Malloch, 1914^{c g}
- Phyllomyza donisthorpei Schmitz, 1923^{c g}
- Phyllomyza epitacta Hendel, 1914^{c g}
- Phyllomyza equitans (Hendel, 1919)^{c g}
- Phyllomyza euthyipalpis^{g}
- Phyllomyza flavipalpis Meijere, 1914^{c g}
- Phyllomyza flavitarsis (Meigen, 1830)^{c g}
- Phyllomyza formicae Schmitz, 1923^{c g}
- Phyllomyza fuscogrisea (Seguy, 1933)^{c g}
- Phyllomyza guangxiensis Xi, Yang & Yin, 2018
- Phyllomyza hirtipalpis Malloch, 1913^{i c g}
- Phyllomyza japonica Iwasa, 2003^{c g}
- Phyllomyza kanmiyai Iwasa, 2003^{c g}
- Phyllomyza longipalpis (Schmitz, 1924)^{c g}
- Phyllomyza lucens Hendel, 1924^{c g}
- Phyllomyza lutea Meijere, 1914^{c g}
- Phyllomyza luteigenis Xi, Yang & Yin, 2018
- Phyllomyza luteipalpis Malloch, 1914^{c g}
- Phyllomyza melania (Hendel, 1919)^{c g}
- Phyllomyza milnei Steyskal, 1942^{i c g b}
- Phyllomyza mongolica Papp, 1976^{c g}
- Phyllomyza nigripalpis Meijere, 1914^{c g}
- Phyllomyza nudipalpis Malloch, 1914^{c g}
- Phyllomyza pallida Meijere, 1940^{c g}
- Phyllomyza proceripalpis Iwasa, 2003^{c g}
- Phyllomyza quadratpalpus Xi, Yang & Yin, 2018
- Phyllomyza rubricornis Schmitz, 1923^{c g}
- Phyllomyza securicornis Fallen, 1823^{i c g}
- Phyllomyza silesiaca (Duda, 1935)^{c g}
- Phyllomyza tenebrosa Brunetti, 1924^{c g}
- Phyllomyza tetragona Hendel, 1924^{c g}

Data sources: i = ITIS, c = Catalogue of Life, g = GBIF, b = Bugguide.net
