= Aldrichiomyza =

Scientific classification
- Kingdom: Animalia
- Phylum: Arthropoda
- Class: Insecta
- Order: Diptera
- Family: Milichiidae
- Subfamily: Phyllomyzinae
- Genus: Aldrichiomyza; Hendel, 1914

Synonyms
- Aldrichiella Hendel, 1911

Genus of flies

Aldrichiomyza is a genus of freeloader flies in the family Milichiidae.

== Species ==
The following species are assigned to this genus:

- Aldrichiomyza agromyzina (Hendel, 1911)
- Aldrichiomyza elephas (Hendel, 1913)
- Aldrichiomyza flaviventris Iwasa, 1997
- Aldrichiomyza iwasai Papp, 2006
- Aldrichiomyza koreana Papp, 2001
- Aldrichiomyza longirostris Hendel, 1931
