= Curtis Williams Sabrosky =

American entomologist

Curtis Williams Sabrosky (3 April 1910, Sturgis, Michigan – 5 October 1997) was an American entomologist. He specialized in Diptera, especially Chloropidae. Sabrosky worked at the Systematic Entomology Laboratory of United States Department of Agriculture and at the National Museum of Natural History, where his collection is now located.

== Partial list of publications ==
=== Diptera ===
- Insects of Macquarie Island Diptera Chloropidae, Milichidae Pacific Insects 4 (4): 308–311 (1964).
- 1999, Family-Group Names in Diptera, Myia, 10:1–576. Important systematic/nomenclatural work (PDF format).
- With Wirth, WW, Foote, RH and Coulson, JR: A Catalog of the Diptera of America North of Mexico. Agricultural Research Service, United States Department of Agriculture, Washington, DC. 1696 pp. (1965).

=== Asteiidae ===
- Contributions to the knowledge of Old World Asteiidae. Revue francaise d'entomologie (Nouvelle Serie) 23:216–243.

=== Chloropidae and Milichidae ===
- Milichidae and Chloropidae (Diptera from the Batu Caves, Malaya. Pacific Insects 6 (2): 308–311 (1964).

=== Tachinidae ===
- Identification of Winthemia of America north of Mexico, with a revised key to the females (Diptera, Tachinidae). Annals of the Entomological Society of America 66: 1035–1041. (1973).
- A revised key to the Nearctic species of Lespesia (Diptera: Tachinidae). Annals of the Entomological Society of America 73: 63–73 (1980). With P.H. Arnaud, Jr. Family Tachinidae (Larvaevoridae). pp. 961–1108 in Stone, A., et al. (eds.), A Catalog of the Diptera of America North of Mexico. United States Department of Agriculture, Agriculture Handbook 276: 1–1696 (1965).
- With R.C. Reardon: Tachinid parasites of the gypsy moth, Lymantria dispar, with keys to adults and puparia. Miscellaneous Publications of the Entomological Society of America 10(2): 1–126.(1976).
