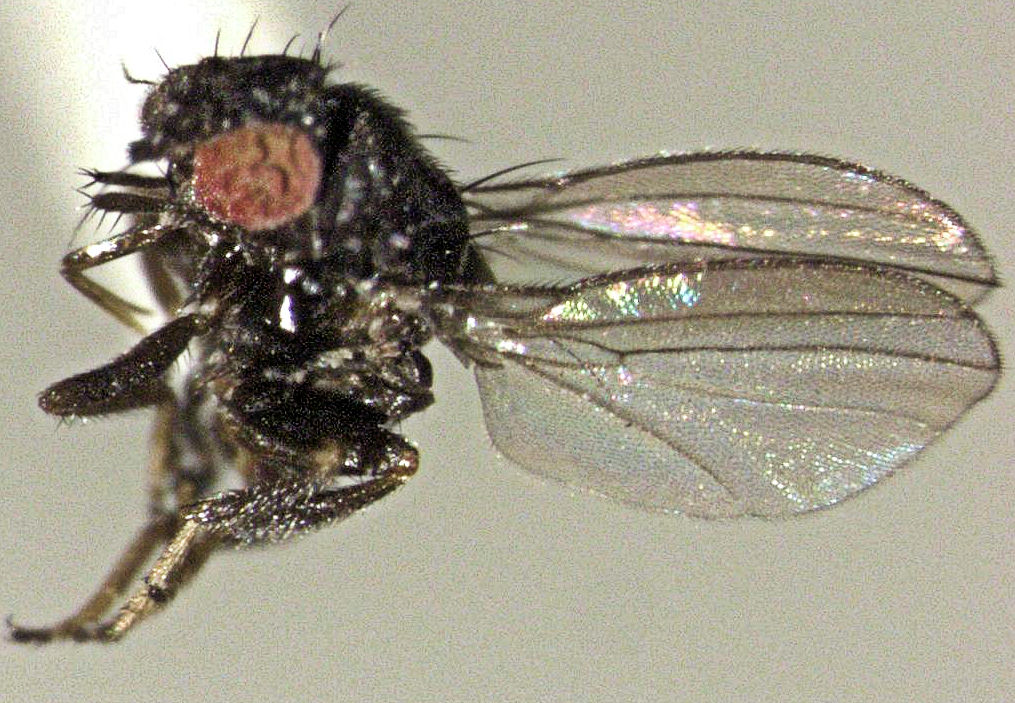
- Adult of a Paramyia species

Scientific classification
- Kingdom: Animalia
- Phylum: Arthropoda
- Clade: Pancrustacea
- Class: Insecta
- Order: Diptera
- Section: Schizophora
- Subsection: Acalyptratae
- Superfamily: Carnoidea
- Family: Milichiidae; Schiner, 1862

Subfamilies
- Madizinae; Milichiinae; Phyllomyzinae

= Milichiidae =

Family of flies

Milichiidae are a family of flies. Most species are very small and dark. Details of their biology have not yet been properly studied, but they are best known as kleptoparasites of predatory invertebrates, and accordingly are commonly known as freeloader flies or jackal flies. However, because of the conditions under which many species breed out, they also are known as filth flies.

== Affinities and appearance ==
The Milichiidae are a family of flies in the suborder Brachycera. They were at one time included in the family Carnidae. At one time or another they have been assigned to various superfamilies, including Carnoidea, Chloropoidea, and Agromyzoidea. As usual for flies of these groups, Milichiidae imagines are tiny, but their heads are comparatively large, compared to many fly species of the same size, such as those in the family Phoridae.

Milichiidae are small-to-very-small flies, usually 1 to 3 mm in length. Typically they are black or at least dark. In some species, such as Milichiella argyrogaster, the abdomen of the male is silvery on its dorsal surface because of a covering of fine hairs. The eyes of Milichiidae are often red, though this need not be obvious because many species of the flies are small and dusky. Though the proboscis is fairly long in most species, this is not obvious because it commonly is geniculate, having a knee-like fold in the middle that holds it inconspicuously beneath the head when the animal is not feeding. When it is looking for a place to feed on the prey of a spider or the like, the proboscis is extended, giving an impression of licking, as shown in the accompanying video. The abdomen is short and broad; it may be impressively distended after a large meal, as shown in the accompanying photographs.

== Biology ==
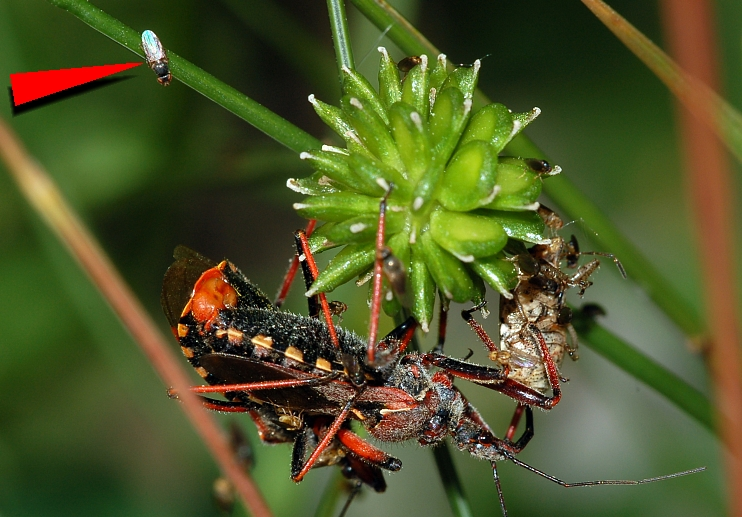
Milichiidae attending Rhinocoris bugs mating as the female feeds

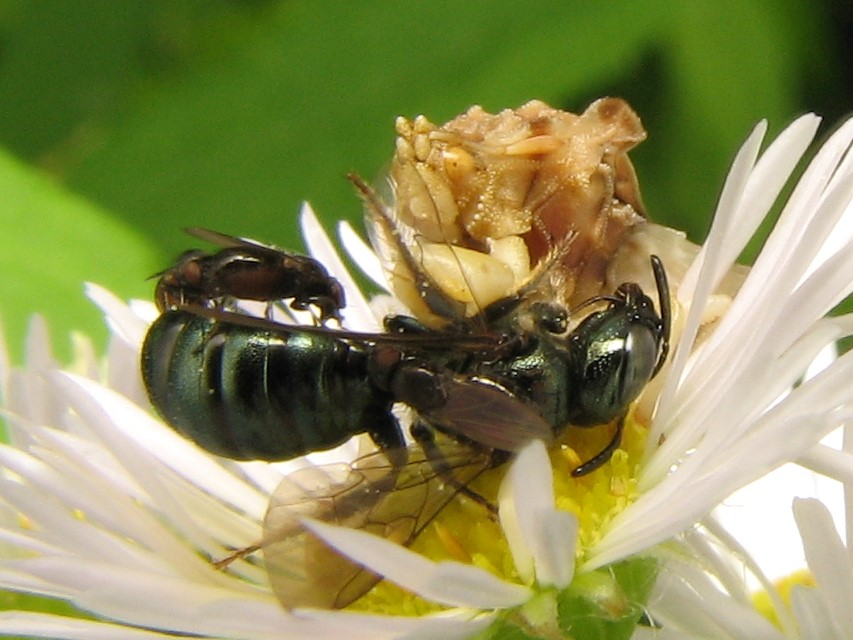
Neophyllomyza sp. on bee killed by ambush bug

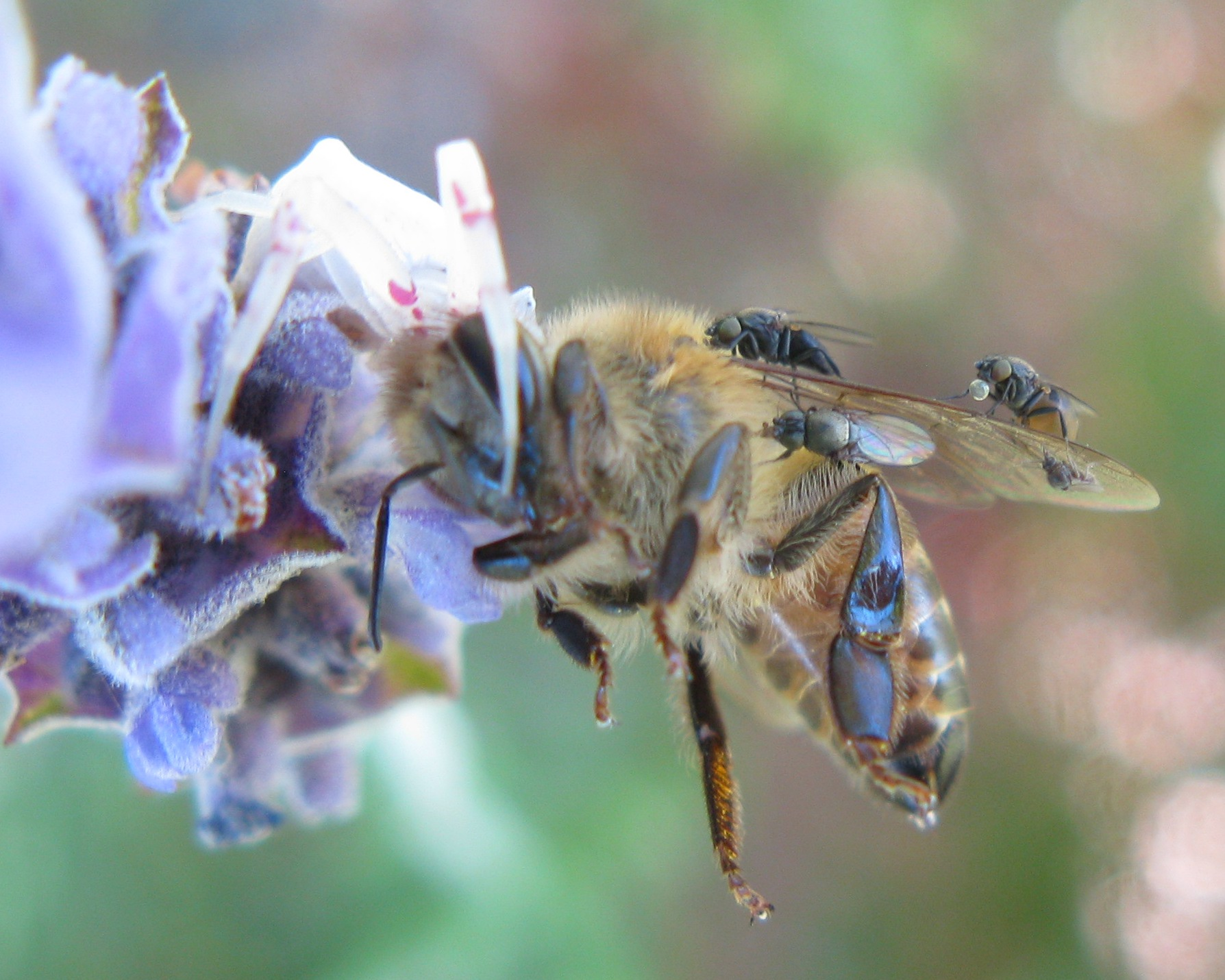
First image of four, showing Milichiidae, probably Desmometopa, attending a thomisid spider feeding on bee. Note that the smallest of the four flies is not a milichiid, but probably a species of biting midge (Ceratopogonidae). One of the flies is gorged, with a distended abdomen, and has a drop of clear fluid hanging from its labellum.

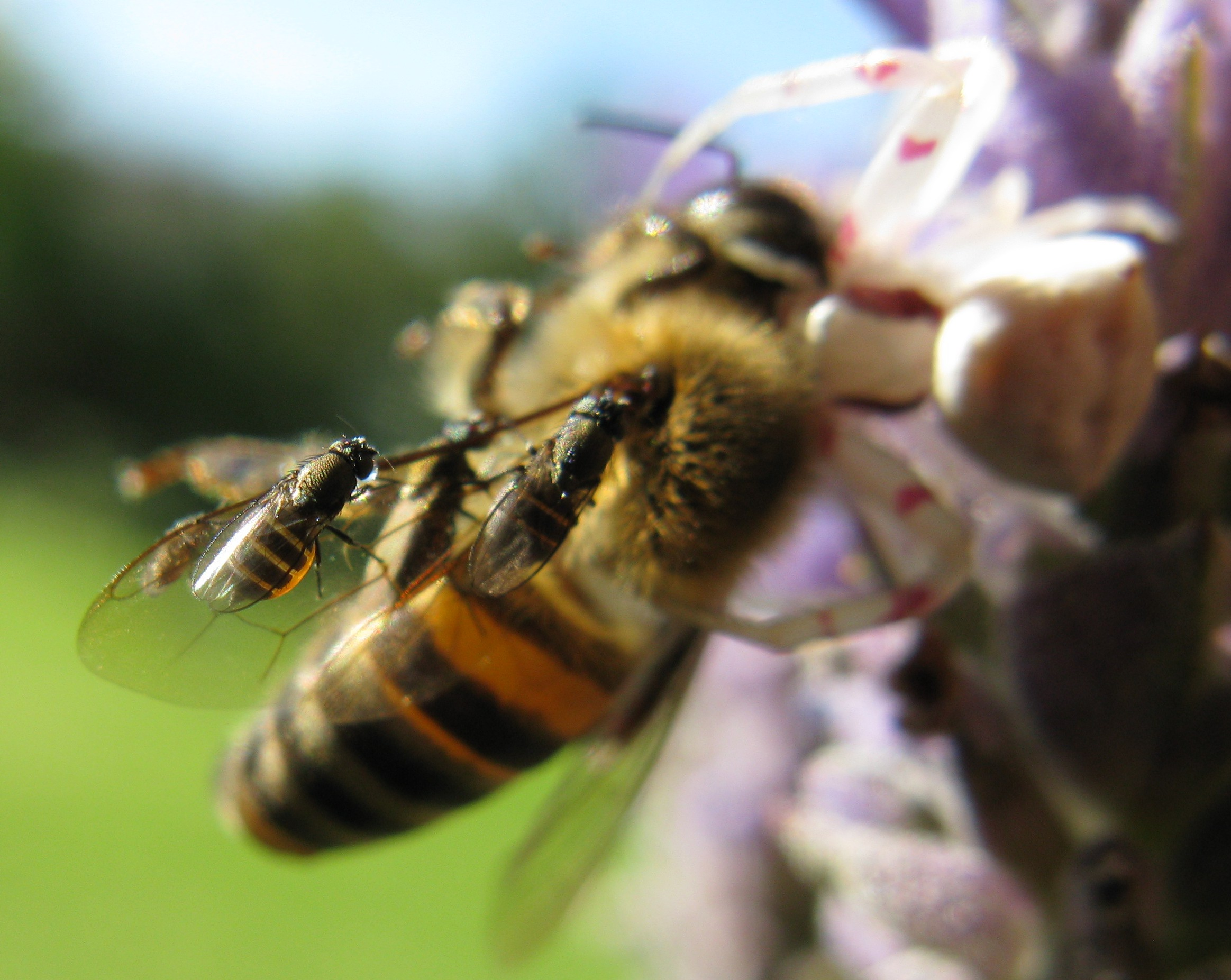
Only a few minutes later, the other flies are also becoming distended, except for the midge.

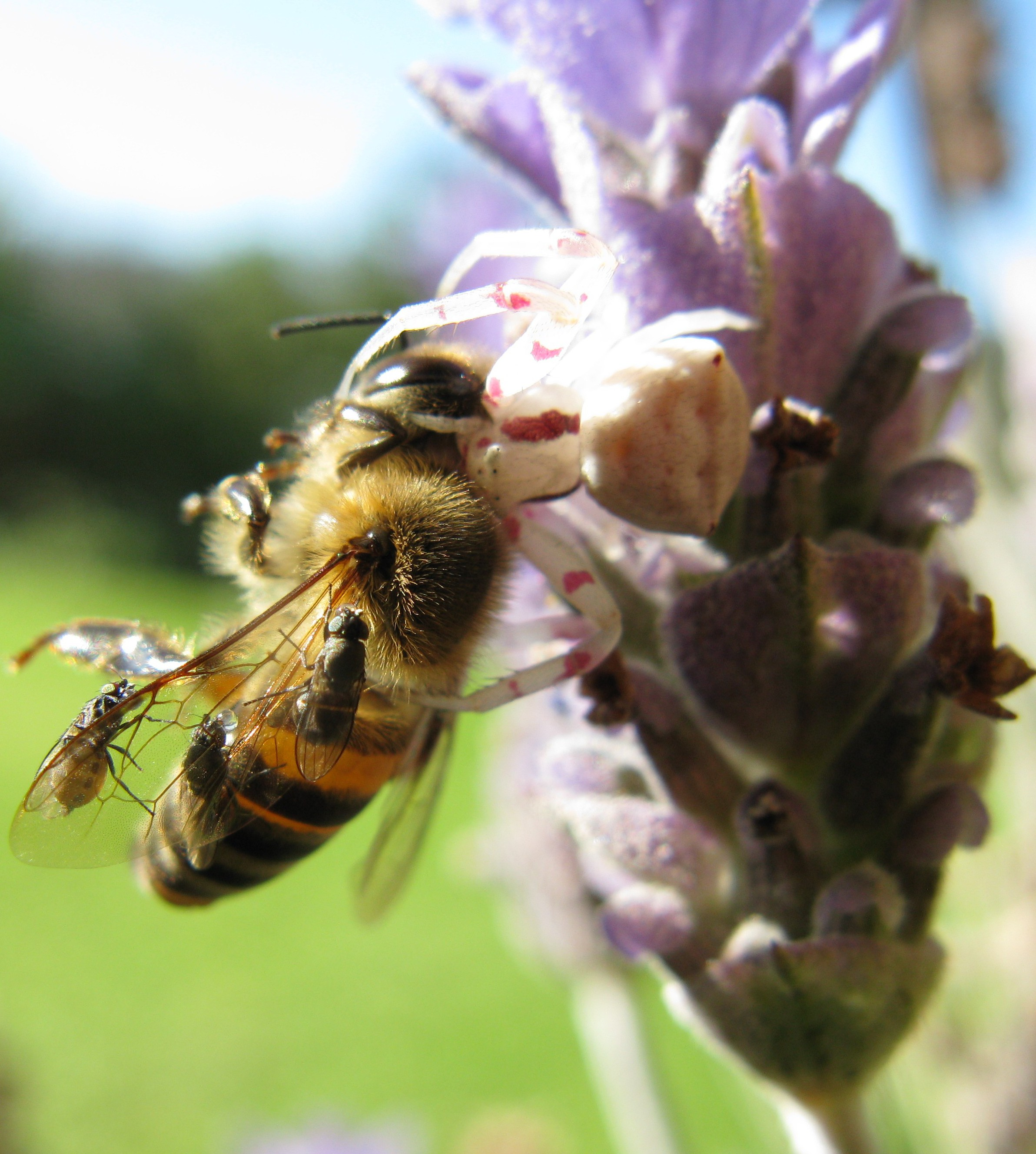
All three flies are at least reasonably full.

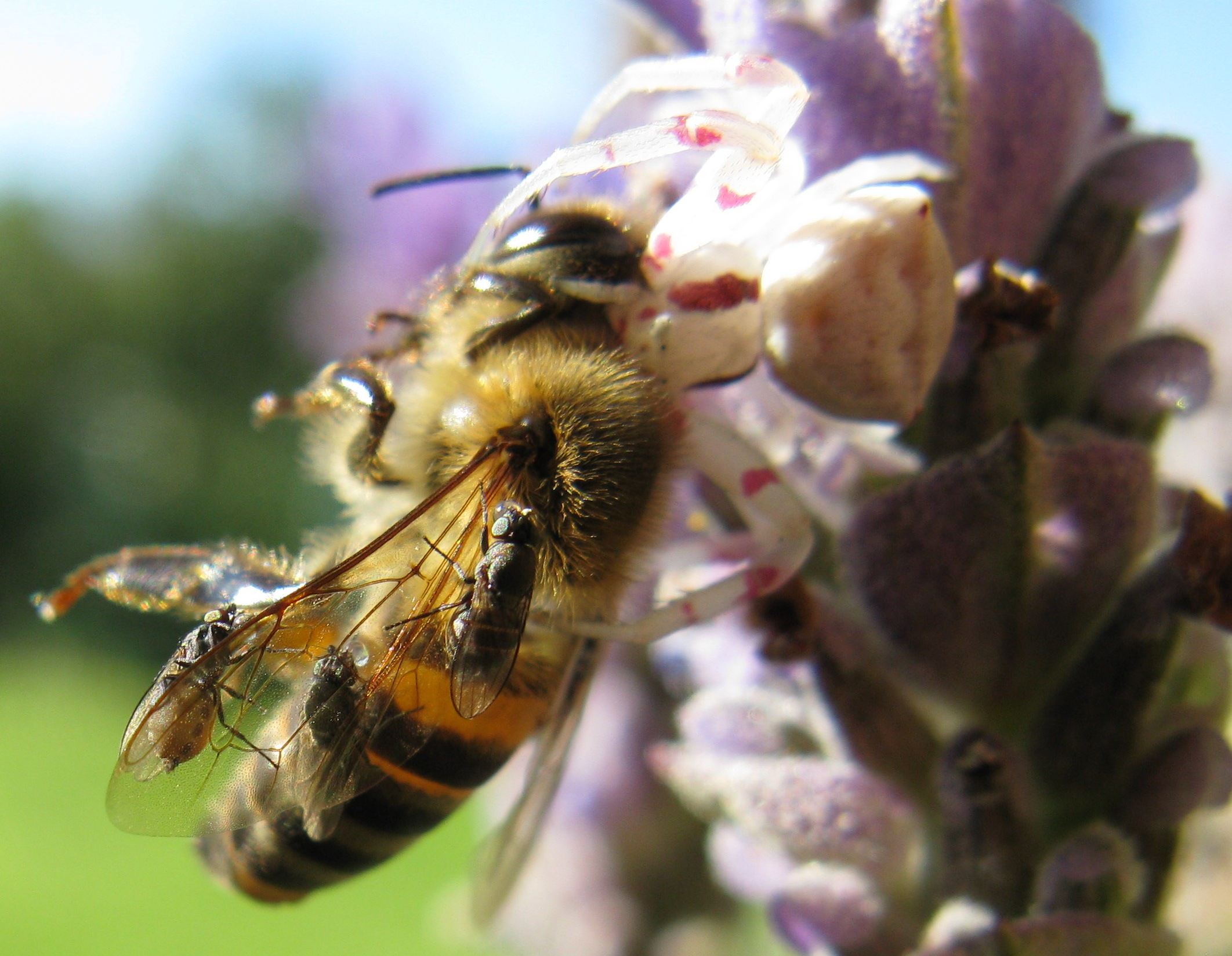
All three have apparently stopped feeding by now, and for some reason all are presenting globes of liquid food on their labella.

The larval stage generally lasts about 2–3 weeks in temperate climates. Larvae primarily feed on rotting vegetable matter or decaying wood or bark and may be reared from manure or decaying plant materials. At least some are coprophagous and feed on human ordure and other detritus, hence the common name "filth flies". At least some species may breed in dead fish and other carrion, a point of possible interest in forensic entomology.

Some species also have been recovered or reared from birds' nests and bat roosts, but reports of parasitism on birds' nestlings by Milichiidae should be interpreted with caution; at one time Milichiidae and Carnidae were not regarded as separate families, and it is not always clear how many of such reports refer to any species other than those that nowadays are included in the Carnidae and separated from the Milichiidae.

Human commerce has inadvertently spread some species to all continents but Antarctica. Examples include members of the genera Desmometopa and Milichiella.

The adults of some species linger close to invertebrate predators, where they act as kleptoparasites, feeding on bodily fluids of the prey. This strategy has given rise to a range of common names such as freeloader flies and jackal flies. The nature of the kleptoparasitism that Milichiidae practise is difficult to detect from direct observation; some observers remark that they seem to lick the prey rather than anything else. However, it seems that they get whatever nourishment they can; the accompanying photographs suggest that at least some species penetrate the thinnest cuticle of a bee in a spider's jaws, extracting tissues that enzymes in the venom of the spider have reduced to a fluid state. When extended, the proboscis certainly is long enough for feeding in such a manner.

The "jackal" habit has been widely documented, with many pictures and references to Millichiidae assembling on the prey of spiders (especially Nephilinae, Oxyopidae, and Thomisidae). They also visit Asilidae, Reduviidae, and even Mantodea. However, a point that is rarely mentioned is that most prey insects do not attract Milichiidae particularly. Instead they seem only to follow the scents exuded by killed prey such as Hemiptera, Heteroptera (stink bugs), and Hymenoptera. This is compatible with the fact that photographs of Milichiidae on prey, almost universally show them on insects that provide such olfactory clues. This would be compatible with the idea that predators that commonly hunt prey that release a dramatic and characteristic olfactory signal, thereby create a niche for suitable kleptoparasites. In at least species that are attracted to prey of Nephilinae in Florida, the major attractants released by Heteropteran prey appear to be low-molecular-weight carbonyl compounds, among which trans-2-hexenal and hexanal are prominent. These compounds are not conspicuous among those released by captured honeybees, so other classes of attractants are likely to be significant as well. In general there is suggestive evidence that the kleptoparasitism relies on olfactory clues; for example, some species seem to operate in the dark, and photographs of approaching flies seem to show them flying upwind, which is consistent with scent following.

Xysticus sp. with preyed bee and Desmometopa m-nigrum

A notable point is that spiders' meals can have various forms of significance in nature. For one thing, though they may be the most conspicuous of such partakers, the jackal habit is not unique to the Milichiidae, nor do all species in the family necessarily indulge in it, nor for all the same reasons. Certainly careful inspection of photographs of spiders' prey often will show a few specimens from other families of small flies present among the Milichiidae. Examples include Phoridae and Chloropidae. The high frequency of Milichiidae around prey of particular species however, suggests that they are more highly adapted to such activities than most. However, this impression might be regional; reports on field work suggest that in parts of Florida for example, the predominant kleptoparasites were in the family Cecidomyiidae. However, dedicated investigation revealed an impressively wide range of visitors, including Ceratopogonidae and Phoridae. The attraction of the aromas of feeding female spiders, and even of promising sites for female ambushes, also extends to male crab spiders Thomisidae of some species, but in their case the function of the attraction is likely to be reproduction rather than nourishment. Most kleptoparasitic Michiliidae are females, the males presumably having a lower requirement for proteinaceous food; however, as inferred in from the apparent presentation of droplets of food from the proboscises of gorged females, it is possible that the presence of females at the spiders' meals might be reason for males to assemble as well.

Another activity observed in some species of Michiliidae, shows them to be serving a function analogous to that of cleaner wrasse and cleaner shrimp; they literally scavenge around the chelicerae and anal openings of large spiders, such as species of Araneus and Nephila, that cooperatively spread their wet and sticky chelicerae thus allowing the flies to feed actively all over the bases, fangs and mouth.

Some Michiliidae act in various roles as kleptoparasites of various ants.

== Selected genera ==
Subfamily Madizinae

- Aldrichiomyza Hendel, 1914
- Desmometopa Loew, 1866
- Enigmilichia Deeming, 1981
- Leptometopa Becker, 1903
- Madiza Fallén, 1810
- Paramyia Williston, 1897
- Stomosis Melander, 1913

Subfamily Milichiinae

- Eusiphona Coquillett, 1897
- Milichia Meigen, 1830
- Milichiella Giglio-Tos, 1895
- Pholeomyia Bilimek, 1867
- Ulia Becker, 1907

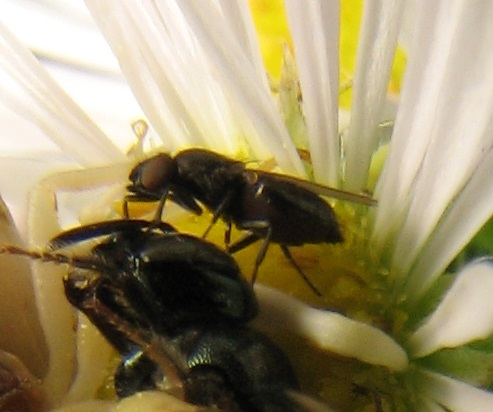
Neophyllomyza sp. on bee killed by ambush bug

Subfamily Phyllomyzinae

- Borneomyia Brake, 2004
- Costalima Sabrosky, 1953
- Microsimus Aldrich, 1926
- Neophyllomyza Melander, 1913
- Paramyioides Papp, 2001
- Phyllomyza Fallén, 1810
- Genus Xenophyllomyza Ozerov, 1992
