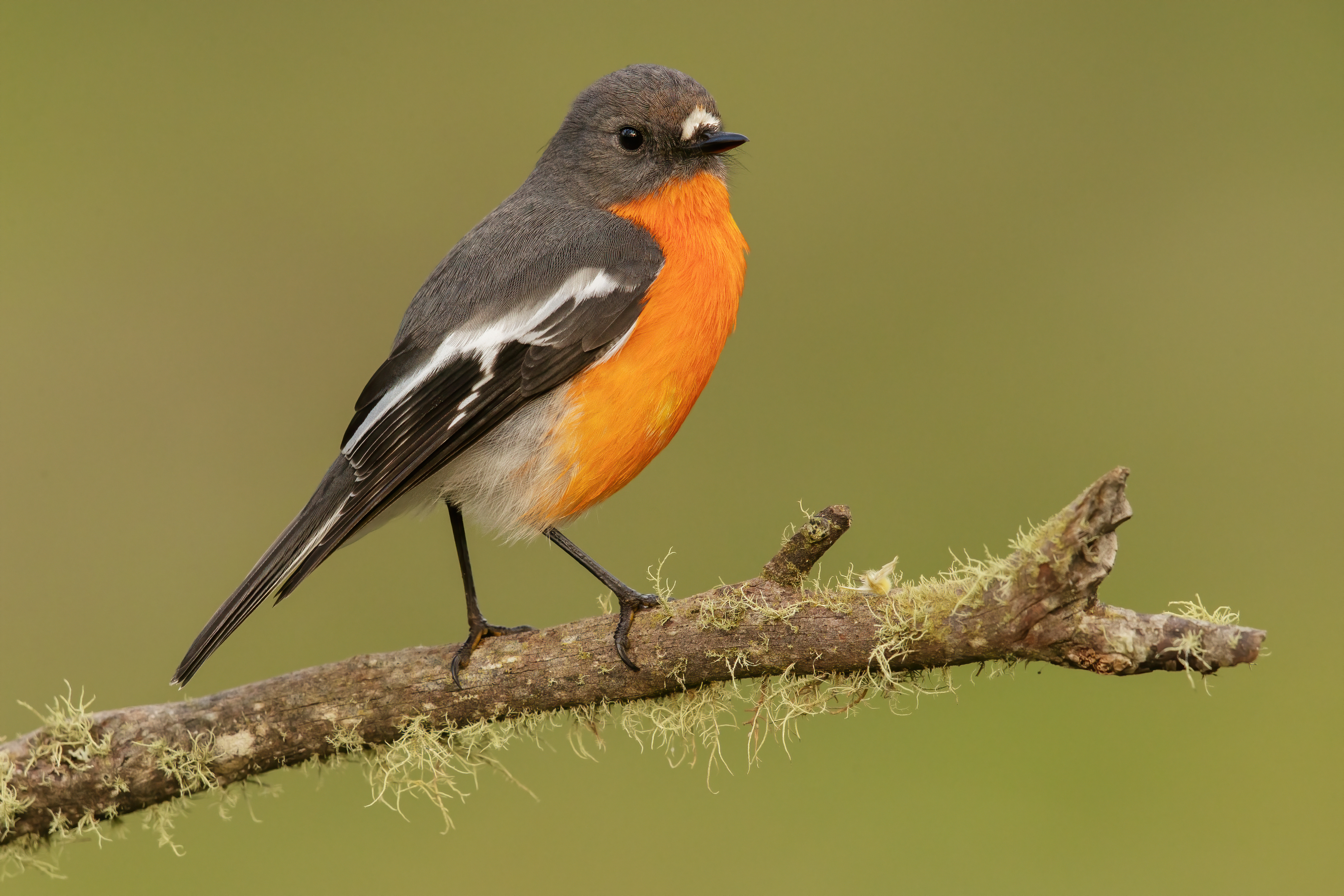
- male
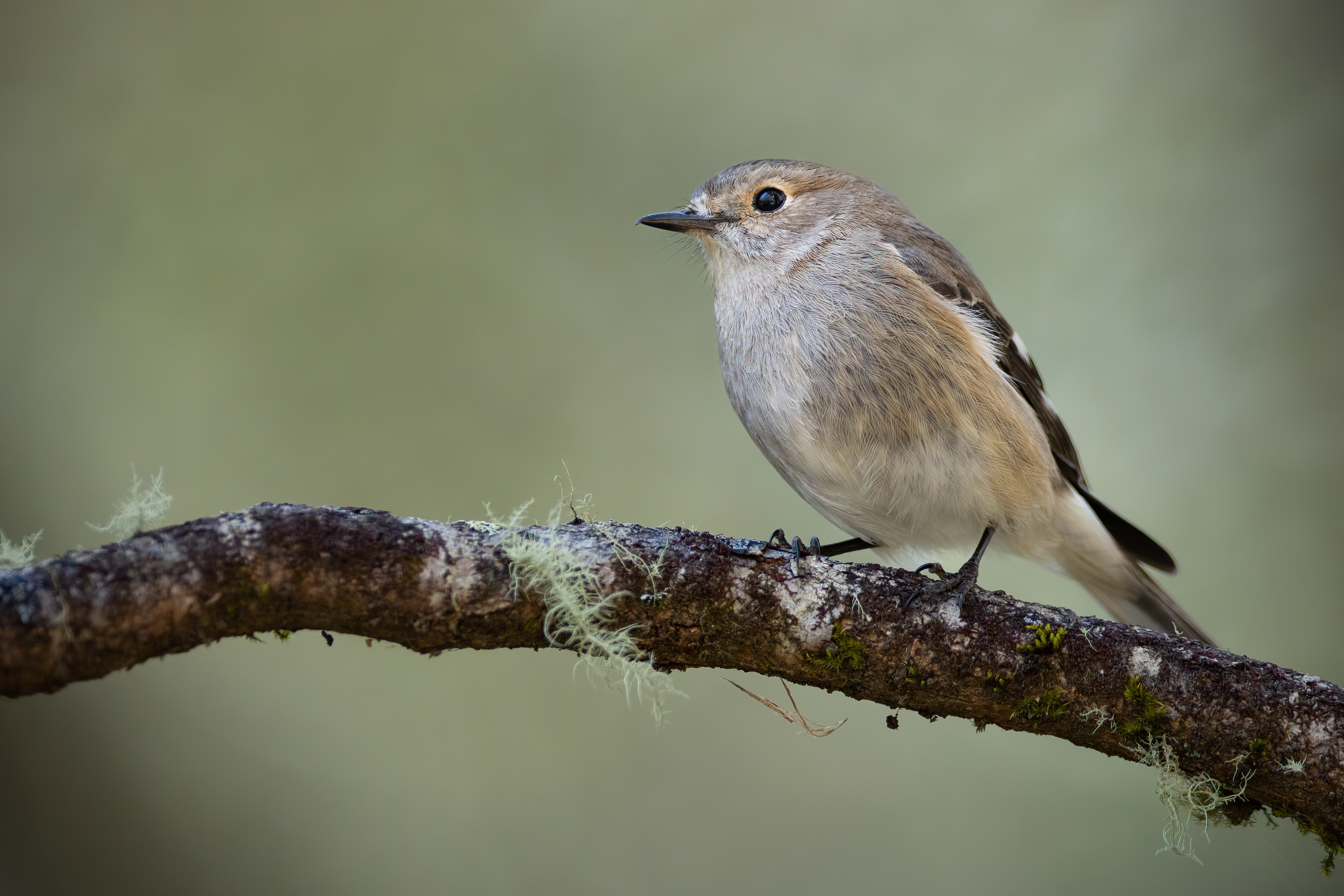
- female

Conservation status
- Least Concern (IUCN 3.1)

Scientific classification
- Kingdom: Animalia
- Phylum: Chordata
- Class: Aves
- Order: Passeriformes
- Family: Petroicidae
- Genus: Petroica
- Species: P. phoenicea

Binomial name
- Petroica phoenicea Gould, 1837
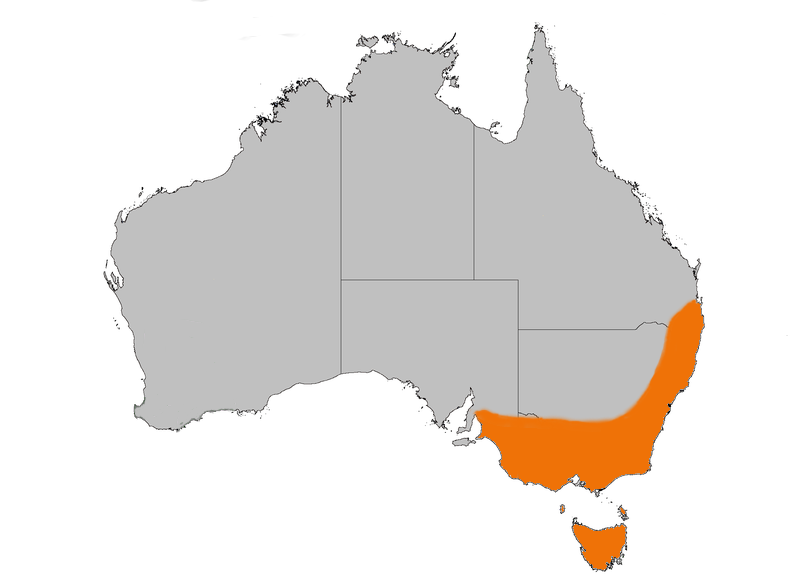

= Flame robin =

Species of small passerine bird

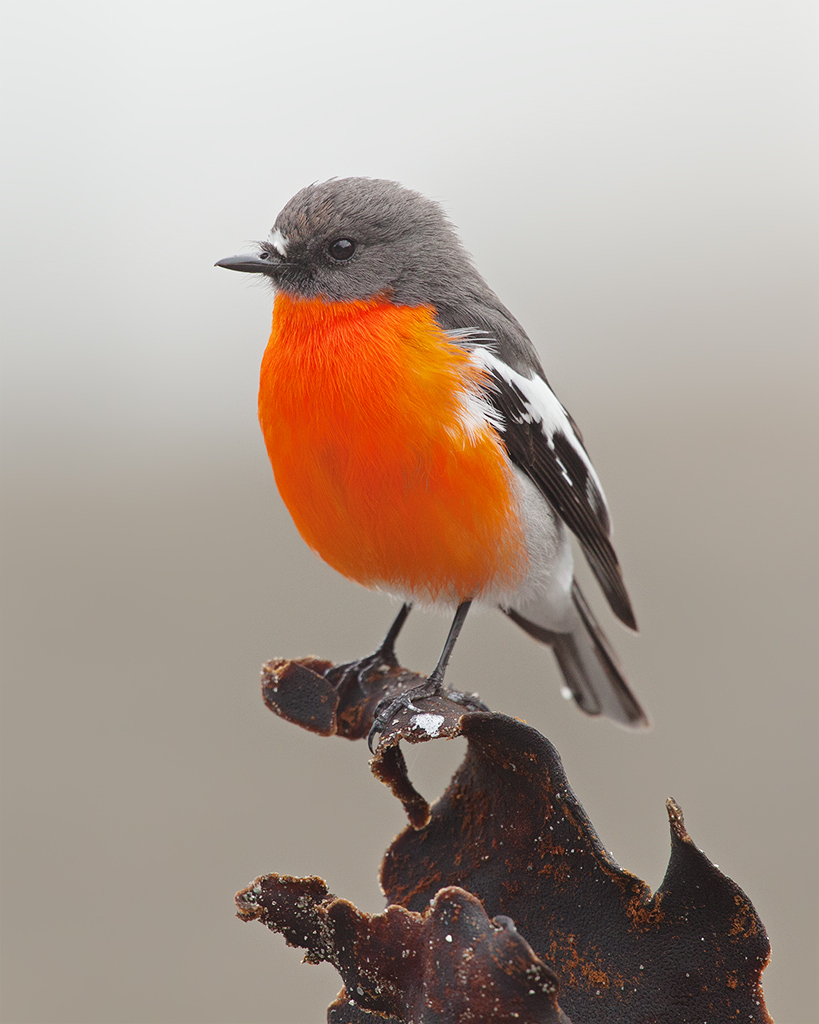
Eaglehawk Neck, Tasmania

The flame robin (Petroica phoenicea) is a small passerine bird native to Australia. It is a moderately common resident of the coolest parts of south-eastern Australia, including Tasmania. Like the other two red-breasted Petroica robins—the scarlet robin and the red-capped robin—it is often simply called the robin redbreast. Like many brightly coloured robins of the Petroicidae, it is sexually dimorphic. Measuring 12–14 cm (4.7–5.5 in) long, the flame robin has dark brown eyes and a small thin black bill. The male has a brilliant orange-red chest and throat, and a white patch on the forehead above the bill. Its upper parts are iron-grey with white bars, and its tail black with white tips. Female coloration is a muted grey-brown. Its song has been described as the most musical of its genus.

The position of the flame robin and its Australian relatives on the passerine family tree is unclear; the Petroicidae are not closely related to either the European or American robins, but appear to be an early offshoot of the Passerida group of songbirds. The flame robin is predominantly insectivorous, pouncing on prey from a perch in a tree, or foraging on the ground. A territorial bird, the flame robin employs song and plumage displays to mark out and defend its territory. It is classified by BirdLife International as least concern.

== Taxonomy ==
The flame robin was first described by the French naturalists Jean René Constant Quoy and Joseph Paul Gaimard in 1830 as Muscicapa chrysoptera. The specific epithet chrysoptera is derived from the Ancient Greek words chrysos 'golden', and pteron 'feather'.

John Gould placed the flame robin in its current genus as Petroica phoenicea in his 1837 description, and it was this latter binomial name that has been used since that time. Given this, Quoy and Gaimard's name was declared a nomen oblitum. The generic name is derived from the Ancient Greek words petros, 'rock', and oikos, 'home', from the birds' habit of sitting on rocks. The specific epithet is also derived from Ancient Greek, from the adjective phoinikeos 'crimson, dark red'. It is one of five red- or pink-breasted species colloquially known as "red robins", as distinct from the "yellow robins" of the genus Eopsaltria. Although named after the European robin, the flame robin is not closely related to either it or the American robin. The Australian robins were placed in the Old World flycatcher family Muscicapidae, and the whistler family Pachycephalidae, before being classified in their own family Petroicidae. Sibley and Ahlquist's DNA-DNA hybridisation studies placed the robins in a Corvida parvorder comprising many tropical and Australian passerines, including pardalotes, fairy-wrens and honeyeaters, as well as crows. However, subsequent molecular research (and current consensus) places the robins as a very early offshoot of the Passerida, or "advanced" songbirds, within the songbird lineage.

No subspecies are recognised, and the degree of geographic variation is unclear. Adult male birds which breed on the mainland have been reported as having lighter upperparts and underparts than their Tasmanian relatives, and females are said to be browner, but these differences may also result from worn plumage. Furthermore, migration across the Bass Strait by some birds obfuscates the issue. Mainland and Tasmanian birds are the same size. Ornithologists Richard Schodde and Ian Mason argued that the poor quality of museum collections and partially migratory habits meant that discrete subspecies could not be distinguished on the basis of the observed variation within the species.

Flame-breasted robin was the common name formerly used for the species, and it was gradually abbreviated to flame robin. Other names recorded include bank robin, redhead, and (inaccurately) robin redbreast. Flame robin is the preferred vernacular name of the International Ornithological Congress.

== Description ==
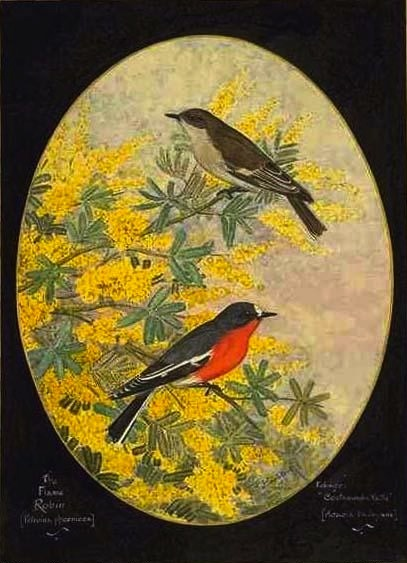
The flame robin, Petroica phoenicea, 1931 by E. E. Gostelow

The largest of the red robins, the flame robin is 12–14 cm (4.7–5.5 in) long. It has a more slender build than other members of the genus Petroica, with relatively long wings and neck and small head. The male is easily distinguished by the bright orange-red plumage of the throat, breast, and abdomen. The crown, nape, ear coverts, hindneck, and sides of neck are dark grey, and lores and chin are a grey-black. The grey feathers of the sides of the crown may be suffused with dull orange. The rest of the upperparts, comprising the wings, back and tail, are dark grey. There is a small, white frontal spot above the bill, and the wing bar and outer tail shafts are white. The feathers of the posterior belly, flanks, and vent are white with grey-black bases. The female is plainly coloured—pale brown overall, and a lighter buff underneath. The lower belly, sides, and underside are a soft off-white colour. Similar to the male, feathers on the sides of the crown might have a subtle hint of dull orange, and this coloration could also extend to the feathers on the breast area. There are small, off-white marks on the wings and above the bill. The bill, legs, feet, and claws are black, and the eyes dark brown. A flame robin with an all lemon-yellow breast and otherwise female plumage was observed in a small flock of flame robins near Swansea, in eastern Tasmania, in September 1950.

Nestlings have dark grey or brown down, cream to grey bills, cream gapes and orange throats. The plumage of juvenile birds in their first moult resembles that of the adult female, but the head and upperparts are streaked and slightly darker. Soon after fledging, juveniles moult into their first immature plumage, and more closely resemble the adult female. The breasts of male juveniles may have some orange feathers. Birds in their second year moult into a second immature phase, some males of which may resemble adult males, while others retain a more immature brown plumage. Determining the age and sex of birds in brown plumage can be very difficult. Information on exact timing of moulting is lacking, but the replacement of primary feathers takes place over the summer months between December and February.

The colour alone is not a reliable guide to determine the species, as some scarlet robins (P. boodang) take on an orange hue, but while male scarlet and red-capped robins (P. goodenovii) have red breasts and black throats, the flame robin's breast plumage extends right up to the base of the bill. It is also a little slimmer and has a smaller head than the scarlet robin, and is clearly larger than the red-capped robin. Females of the respective species are harder to tell apart. Those of red-capped, rose, and pink robins are all smaller, with wing lengths less than 7 cm (2.8 in), smaller than the smallest flame robin. The female scarlet robin has a more pronounced red flush to the breast and the spot on the forehead above the bill is more prominent and white rather than off-white.

The flame robin's calls are grouped into louder and quieter calls; the former can be heard from 150 m (490 ft) away, while the latter, which are often briefer, from 30 m (98 ft). Loud songs make up almost 90% of calls in spring, summer, and autumn, but less than 50% of calls from May to July. Males sing rarely during this time, although they do so to defend their territories. Their song is more varied and complex than that of the scarlet robin, and has been described as the most musical of the red robins. A series of descending notes in groups of three, the musical song has been likened to the phrases, "you-may-come, if-you-will, to-the-sea" or "you-are-not a-pretty-little-bird like-me". Both males and females sing this song, often perched from a vantage point, such as a stump or fence. This loud song is used to attract the attention of a potential mate, and to announce the bringing of food to its mate or young. The softer call has been described as a tlip, terp or pip, and is used as a contact call in the vicinity of the nest. The female makes a hissing sound, if approached while on the nest, and the male has been recorded making a wheezing call when displaying around the nest.

== Distribution and habitat ==
The flame robin is found in temperate regions of southeastern Australia and all over Tasmania, although it is less common in the southwest and west. In Victoria, it is more common in uplands than lower altitudes. It ranges from the Adelaide and Murray Plains around the mouth of the Murray River in southeastern South Australia, across Victoria, and into the South West Slopes and southern regions of New South Wales. Further north, it is found along the Great Dividing Range and its western slopes, with a few records from southeast Queensland. Within its range, it is generally migratory, moving from alpine and subalpine regions to lowlands in winter, although the breeding and non-breeding ranges overlap. There is some evidence that male birds migrate several days before the females. It is unclear what proportion of Tasmanian birds cross Bass Strait to winter in Victoria. Birds which remain in Tasmania move away from breeding areas, and are found in paddocks in loose flocks of up to fourteen birds. They have left these areas by August, and immature birds appear to disperse earlier. A field study in the outer Melbourne suburb of Langwarrin showed that climate did not influence peak abundance of flame robins there. The international organisation BirdLife International has regraded it from Least Concern to Near Threatened in 2004, due to its population decline over the previous 25 years. The Australian Government had classified it as Least Concern, but noted evidence of decline at the edges of its non-breeding range; it has become rare in South Australia, and uncommon in the lowlands of Victoria. Flame robins are not rare in the Victorian high country. They are frequently encountered at high elevations on the Great Dividing Range, especially in sparser snow gum woodland and similar habitat, and during the summer breeding season are one of the most reliably observed species around the summit of Mount Macedon, NW of Melbourne.

In spring and summer, the flame robin is more often found in wet eucalypt forest in hilly or mountainous areas, particularly the tops and slopes, to an elevation of 1,800 m (5,900 ft). It generally prefers areas with more clearings and less understory. In particular, it prefers tall forests dominated by such trees as snow gum (Eucalyptus pauciflora), mountain ash ( E. regnans), alpine ash (E. delegatensis), manna gum (E. viminalis), messmate stringybark (E. obliqua), black gum (E. aggregata), white mountain gum (E. dalrympleana), brown barrel (E. fastigata), narrow-leaved peppermint (E. radiata), and black peppermint (E. amygdalina). It is occasionally encountered in temperate rainforest. In the autumn and winter, birds move to more open areas, such as grasslands and open woodlands, particularly those containing river red gum (E. camaldulensis), Blakely's red gum (E. blakelyi), yellow box (E. melliodora), grey box (E. microcarpa), and mugga ironbark (E. sideroxylon), at lower altitude.

Flame robins often become more abundant in areas recently burnt by bushfires, but move away once the undergrowth regrows. They may also move into logged or cleared areas in forests. However, a field study in the Boola Boola State Forest in central Gippsland revealed they are not found in areas where the regrowth after logging is dense.

== Behaviour ==
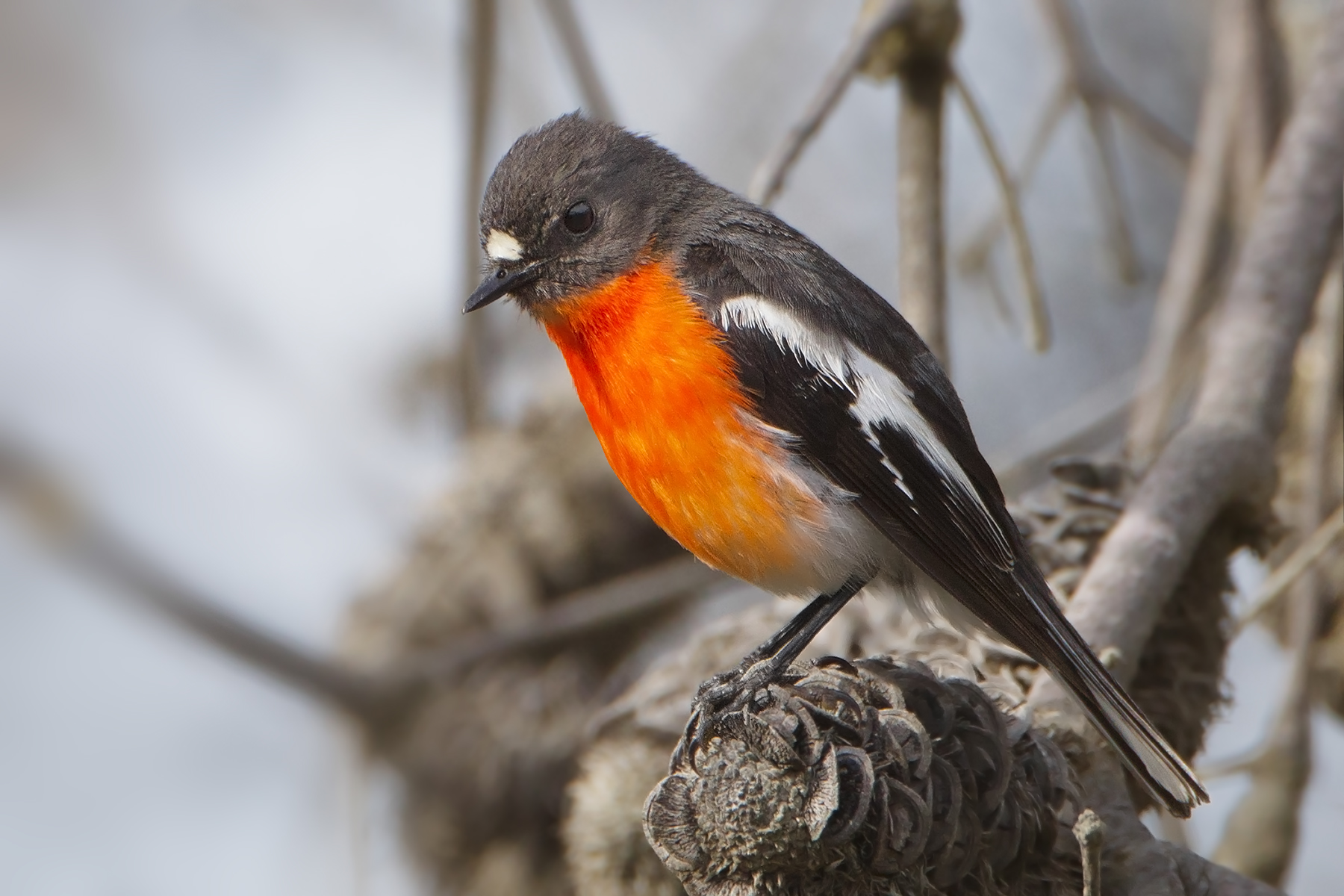
Flame robin near Goat's Beach, Tasmania, Australia

The flame robin mostly breeds in and around the Great Dividing Range, the Tasmanian highlands, and islands in Bass Strait. With the coming of cooler autumn weather, most birds disperse to lower and warmer areas, some travelling as far as eastern South Australia, southern Queensland, or (in the case of some Tasmanian birds) across Bass Strait to Victoria. Birds breeding in the warmer climates north of the Blue Mountains in New South Wales tend to retain their highland territories all year round. Outside the breeding season, birds may congregate in loose flocks, but they are most usually encountered throughout the year singly or in pairs, the latter more commonly in breeding season.

When perched or between bouts of foraging on the ground, the flame robin holds itself in a relatively upright pose, with its body angled at 45° or less from the vertical, and its wings held low below its tail. It impresses as nervous and twitchy, flicking its wings alternately when still. The flame robin's flight is fast, with a markedly undulating character.

The flame robin is territorial, defending its territory against other members of its species, and also against scarlet robins where they co-occur. In Nimmitabel in southern New South Wales, migratory flame robins invaded and eked out their territories from amid existing scarlet robin territories. Once settled, however, no species dominated over the other and stable boundaries emerged. The flame robin deploys a number of agonistic displays, including a breast-puffing display where it puffs its breast feathers, and a white spot display where it puffs its feathers to accentuate its frontal white spot, white wing markings or white outer tail feathers. They may also fly at intruders or sing to defend their territory.

=== Courtship and breeding ===
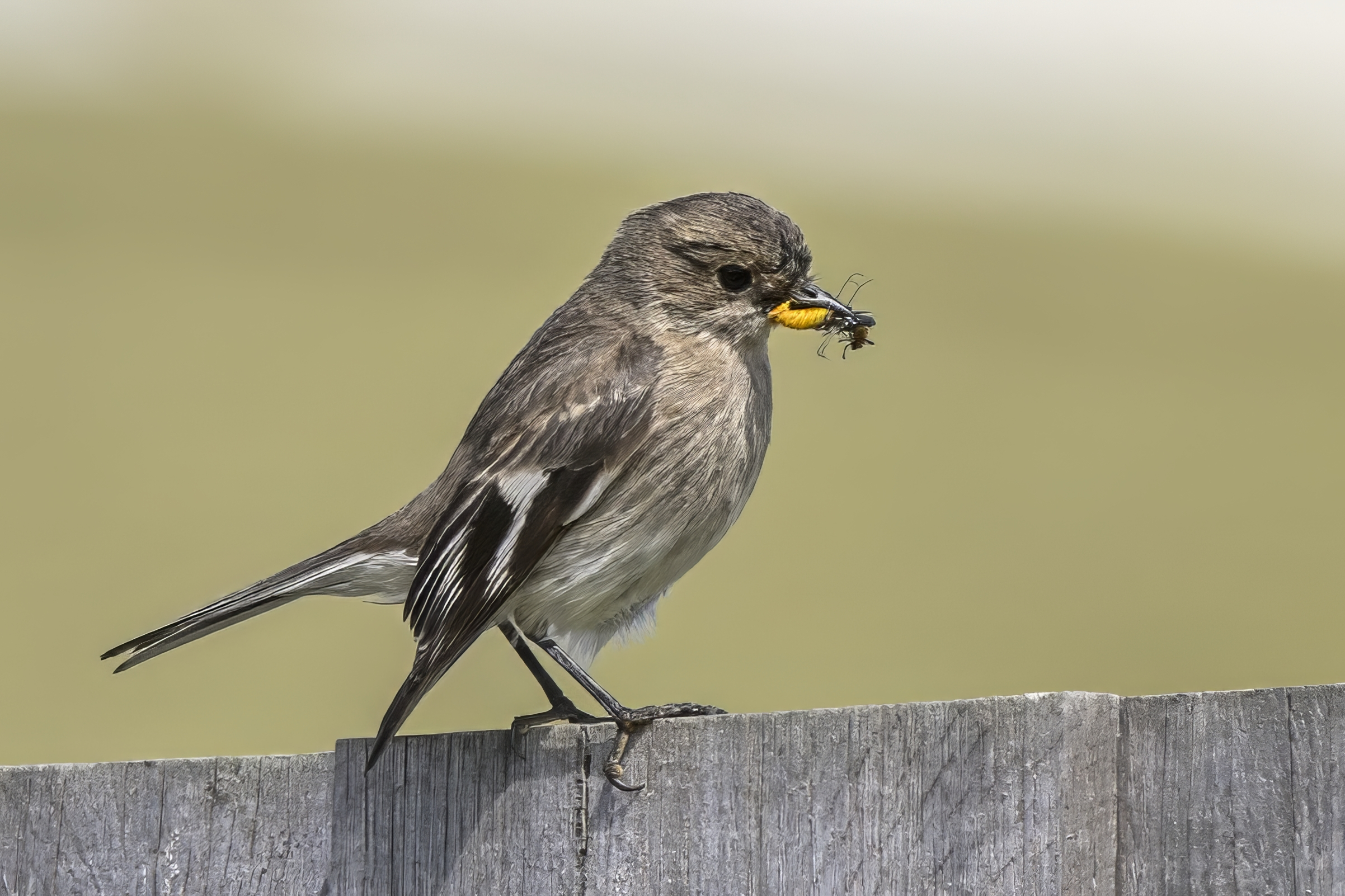
Juvenile with insect

Male and female, Girraween National Park, southern Queensland

Several courtship behaviours have been recorded. Males have been recorded feeding females. A male flame robin either lands next to and moves a female off her perch, or flies in front of her. Courting males also run to and fro in front of a female, in a crouch with wings and head lowered, and hiding their breast feathers. In both displays, the male proceeds to chase the female. Pairs are generally monogamous, and remain together unless one bird perishes, although "divorces" have been recorded.

The breeding season is August to January with one or two broods raised. The male proposes suitable nest sites to the female by hopping around the area. Unlike other robins, the female sometimes initiates the site selection. A pair spends anywhere from one to five days looking before finding a suitable site. The female constructs the nest alone. Eucalypts are generally chosen, but birds have been recorded nesting in Pinus radiata on Mount Wellington in Tasmania. The flame robin is more versatile in its selection of nesting sites than other robins, and has even been recorded nesting in sheds.

The nest is a neat, deep cup made of soft dry grass, moss, and bark. Spider webs, feathers, and fur are used for binding/filling, generally in a tree fork or crevice, or cliff or riverbank ledge, typically within a few metres of the ground. The clutch generally numbers three or four dull white eggs, which are laid on consecutive days. They are tinted bluish, greyish or brownish, and splotched with dark grey-brown, and measure 18 mm x 14 mm. A field study in open eucalypt forest at Nimmitabel found that flame robins and scarlet robins chose different sites to breed, the former in tree hollows and bark crevices, most commonly of Eucalyptus viminalis around 4 m (13 ft) off the ground, and the latter more commonly in forks or on branches of E. pauciflora around 7 m (23 ft) above the ground. Flame robins, which were migratory at the site, were more successful in raising young, but the success rate of scarlet robins in the area appeared to be poor compared with other sites.

Incubation has been recorded as averaging around 17 days. Like all passerines, the chicks are altricial; they are born blind and naked, and start to develop down on their heads on day two. Their eyes open around day six, and they begin developing their primary flight feathers around day nine or ten. For the first three days after hatching, the mother feeds the nestlings alone, with food brought to her by the father. The father feeds them directly from the fourth day onwards, with the mother brooding them afterward until day seven. Flies, butterflies, moths, caterpillars, and beetles predominate in the food fed to the young birds. Flame robins fed a higher proportion of flying insects to their young at Nimmitabel than did scarlet robins, which may have been due to their later start to breeding. Both parents participate in removing faecal sacs from the nest. Parents have been observed feeding young up to five weeks after leaving the nest.

The fan-tailed cuckoo (Cacomantis flabelliformis) and pallid cuckoo (Heteroscenes pallidus) have been recorded as brood parasites of the flame robin; female cuckoos lay their eggs in robin nests, which are then raised by the robins as their own. One fan-tailed cuckoo was recorded ejecting baby robins before being raised by its foster parents. Other nest predators recorded include the grey shrikethrush (Colluricincla harmonica), pied currawong (Strepera graculina), and eastern brown snake (Pseudonaja textilis).

=== Feeding ===
Like all Australasian robins, the flame robin is a perch and pounce hunter, mainly eating insects, and often returning to a favourite low perch several times to stand erect and motionless, scanning the leaf-litter for more prey. They are typically seen in pairs (during the spring and summer breeding season) or in loose companies in more open country during winter, when they more commonly feed on the ground. A field study in the Southern Tablelands of New South Wales found no significant difference in foraging behaviour between male and female flame robins. Birds have been recorded foraging for insects in furrows in freshly ploughed fields. In Deniliquin, a flame robin was observed holding one foot forward and pattering the ground repeatedly to disturb ground-dwelling insects, and then watching and snapping up any which emerged; this behaviour is otherwise seen in waders.

Compared with the scarlet robin, the flame robin eats a higher proportion of flying insects. Biologist, Doug Robinson, has proposed that scarcity of flying insects in winter is a reason why the flame robin migrates. They have been seen in mixed-species flocks with other small insectivorous passerines, such as scarlet robins, hooded robins (Melanodryas cucullata), white-fronted chats (Epthianura albifrons), and Australian pipits (Anthus australis).

Among the types of insects consumed are many families of beetles, wasps, and ants, flies (families Tabanidae and Asilidae), bugs, and caterpillars. Other invertebrates eaten include spiders, millipedes and earthworms. The flame robin consumes small prey items whole, and bashes larger victims against a hard surface repeatedly to break up before eating. The latter group constitute only 0.5% of prey over time—seasonally varying from a peak of 1.8% in autumn to a low of 0.2% of prey caught in winter.
