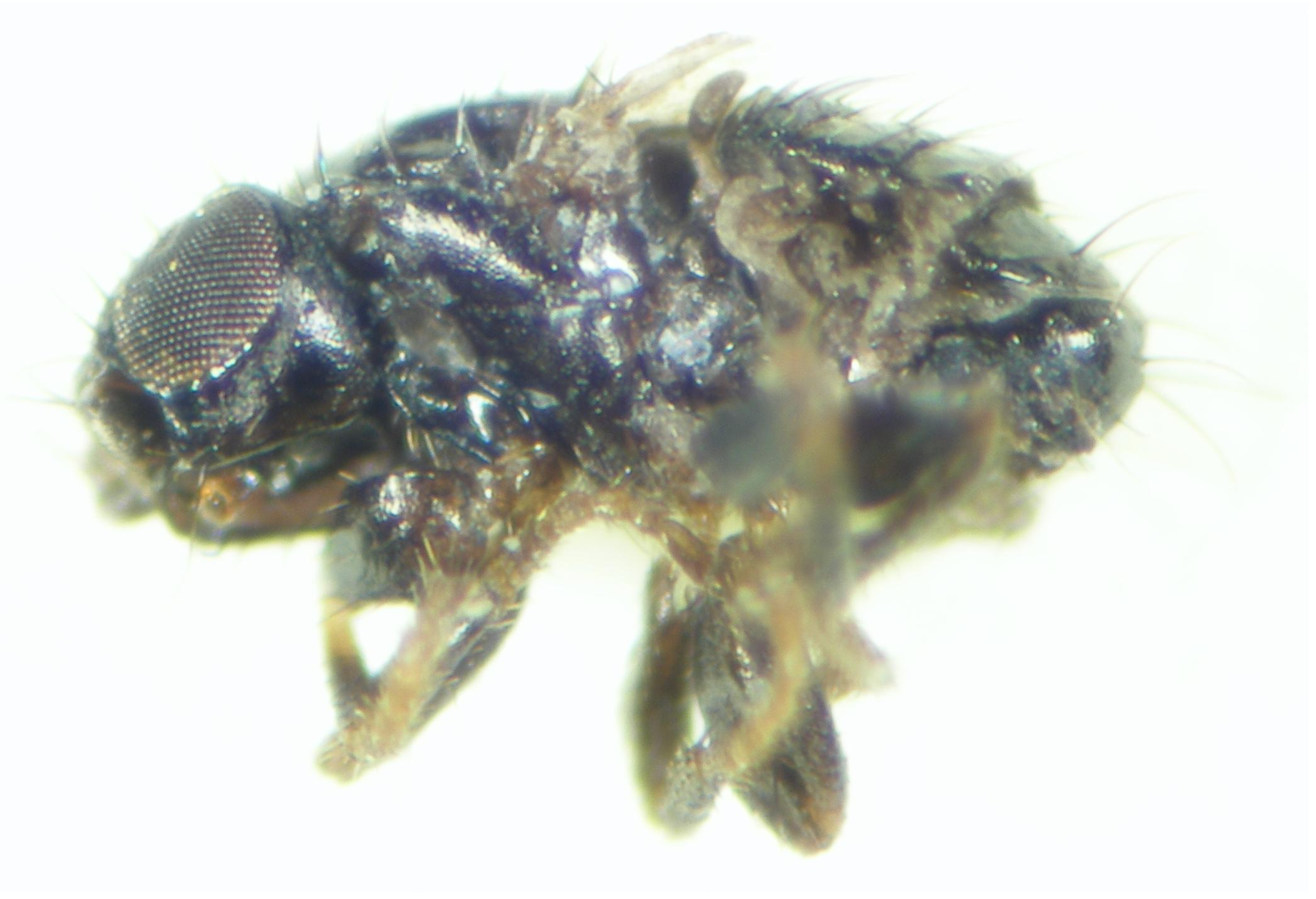
- Carnus hemapterus

Scientific classification
- Kingdom: Animalia
- Phylum: Arthropoda
- Clade: Pancrustacea
- Class: Insecta
- Order: Diptera
- Superfamily: Carnoidea
- Family: Carnidae; Newman, 1834

Synonyms
- Carnidae Frey, 1921; Carniidae Cogan, 1976

= Carnidae =

Family of flies

Carnidae, also known as bird flies or filth flies, is a family of flies (Diptera). There are 6 genera, containing about 93 species worldwide.

== Description ==
Carnidae in general are small (1–2 mm) black flies.

One feature of Carnidae is the frons of the head having some orbital setae medioclinate (pointing inwards) and others lateroclinate (pointing outwards). In Carnus, Hemeromyia, Meoneura and Enigmocarnus, the anterior two pairs of setae are medioclinate and the posterior two pairs are lateroclinate. In Neomeoneurites and the extinct genus Meoneurites, the anteriormost pair is medioclinate and the posterior three pairs are lateroclinate.

== Ecology ==
Most Carnidae are saprophagous. Adults have been found on dung, carrion, flowers of Apiaceae and other plants, in bird nests and sometimes in bird feathers. Larvae have been found in bird and mammal nests, damaged pupae of Sarcophaga sp. (Sarcophagidae), stems of Ferula sp. (Apiaceae), Leccinum fungus (Boletaceae), dung, salted fish and plant remains.

Adults of Carnus such as C. hemapterus and C. orientalis are exceptions, feeding on blood of birds. They are associated with bird nests and nestlings.

== Genera ==
- Carnus Nitzsch, 1818
- Enigmocarnus Buck, 2007
- Hemeromyia Coquillett, 1902
- Meoneura Rondani, 1856
- †Meoneurites Hennig, 1965
- Neomeoneurites Hennig, 1972
