= Fecal sac =

Mucous membrane produced by bird nestlings

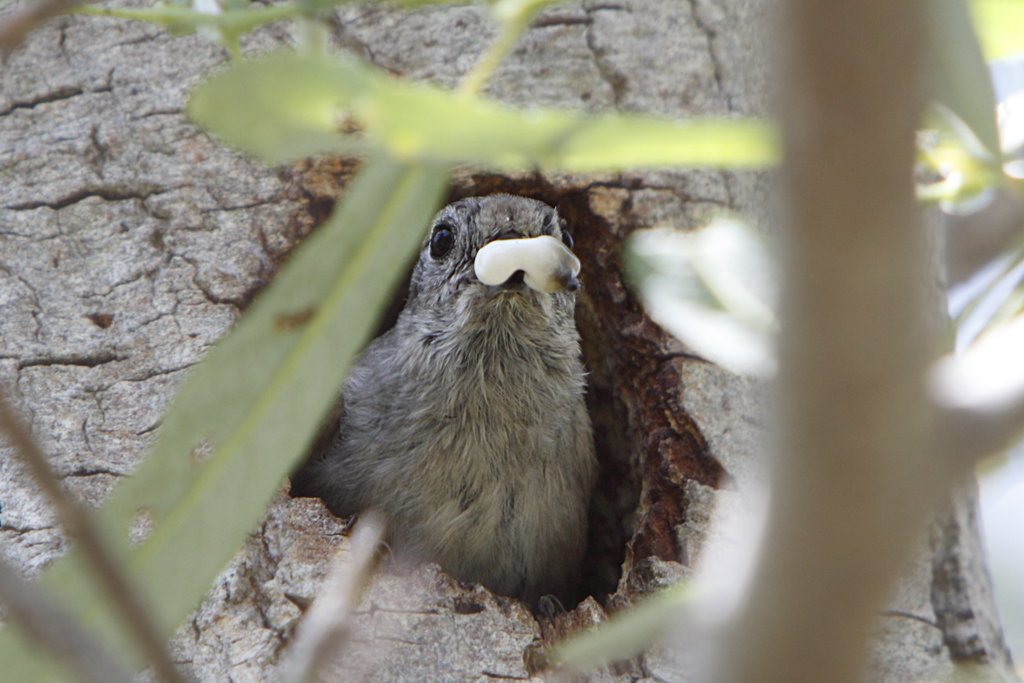
An oak titmouse removes a fecal sac – feces wrapped in a membrane – from its cavity nest.

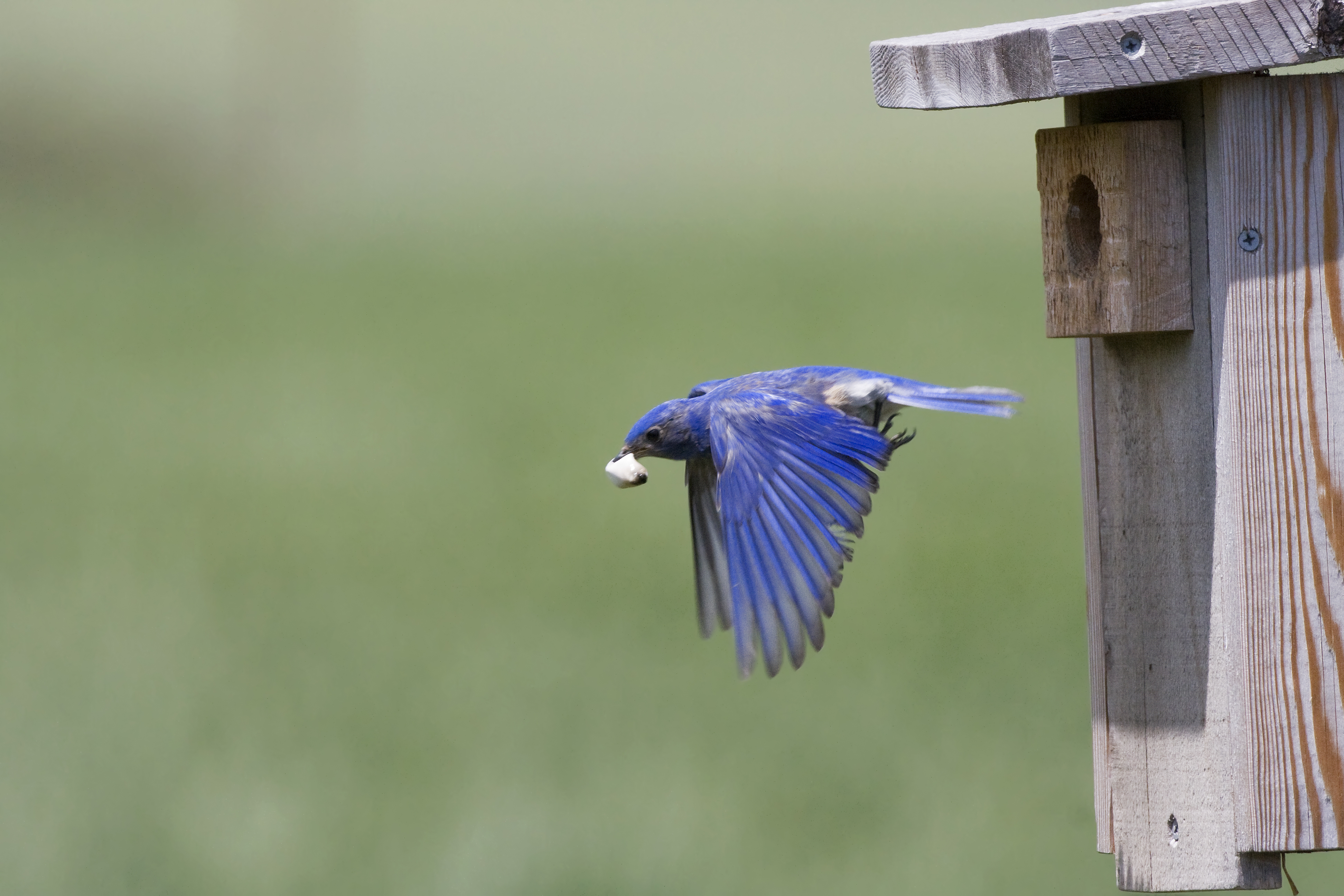
Many species, such as the western bluebird, carry fecal sacs some distance from the nest.

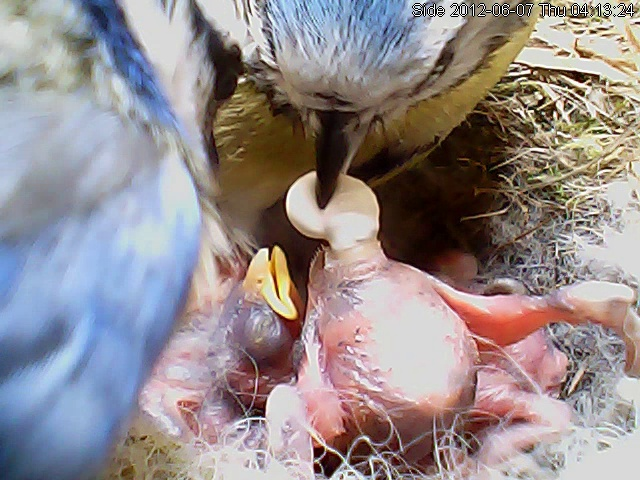
An adult Eurasian blue tit collecting the fecal sac of a chick (just hatched, still naked and blind) to ensure the cleanliness of their nest.

A fecal sac (also spelled faecal sac) is a mucous membrane, generally white or clear with a dark end, that surrounds the feces of some species of nestling birds. It allows parent birds to more easily remove fecal material from the nest. The nestling usually produces a fecal sac within seconds of being fed; if not, a waiting adult may prod around the youngster's cloaca to stimulate excretion. Young birds of some species adopt specific postures or engage in specific behaviors to signal that they are producing fecal sacs. For example, nestling curve-billed thrashers raise their posteriors in the air, while young cactus wrens shake their bodies. Other species deposit the sacs on the rim of the nest, where they are likely to be seen (and removed) by parent birds.

Not all species generate fecal sacs. They are most prevalent in passerines and their near relatives, which have altricial young that remain in the nest for longer periods. In some species, the fecal sacs of small nestlings are eaten by their parents. In other species, and when nestlings are older, sacs are typically taken some distance from the nest and discarded. Young birds generally stop producing fecal sacs shortly before they fledge.

Removal of fecal material helps to improve nest sanitation, which in turn helps to increase the likelihood that nestlings will remain healthy. It also helps to reduce the chance that predators will see it or smell it and thereby find the nest. Experiments on starling nests suggest that bacteria in faeces produce volatile chemicals that may provide cues for predators and ectoparasites such as flies in the genus Carnus. There is evidence that parent birds of some species gain a nutritional benefit from eating the fecal sacs; studies have shown that females – which tend to be more nutritionally stressed than their mates – are far more likely to consume sacs than are males. Even brood parasites such as brown-headed cowbirds, which do not care for their own offspring, have been documented swallowing the fecal sacs of nestlings of their host species.

Scientists can use fecal sacs to learn a number of things about individual birds. Examination of the contents of the sac can reveal details of the nestling's diet, and can indicate what contaminants the young bird has been exposed to. The presence of an adult bird carrying a fecal sac is used in bird censuses as an indication of breeding.
