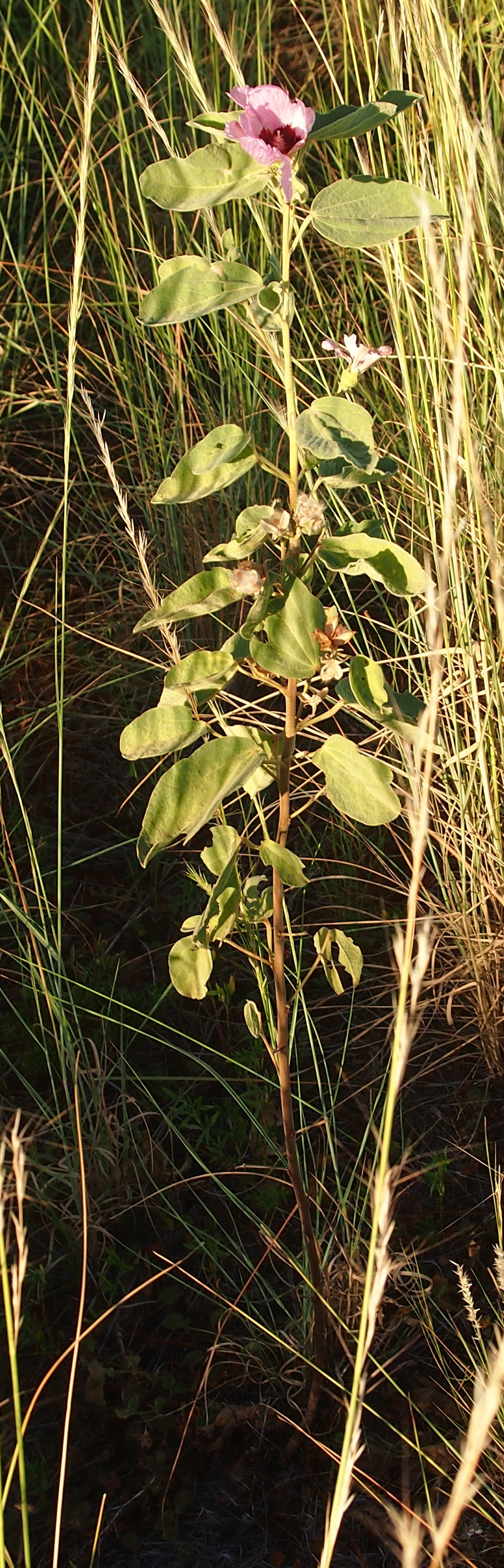

Conservation status
- Rare (NCA)

Scientific classification
- Kingdom: Plantae
- Clade: Embryophytes
- Clade: Tracheophytes
- Clade: Angiosperms
- Clade: Eudicots
- Clade: Rosids
- Order: Malvales
- Family: Malvaceae
- Genus: Gossypium
- Species: G. sturtianum

Binomial name
- Gossypium sturtianum J.H. Willis

Synonyms
- Cienfuegosia gossypioides (R.Br.) Hochr.; Gossypium australiense Tod.; Gossypium gossypioides (R.Br.) C.A.Gardner nom. illeg.; Gossypium nandewarense Derera; Gossypium sturtii F.Muell. nom. illeg.

= Gossypium sturtianum =

Sturt's Desert Rose

Species of flowering plant in the mallow family

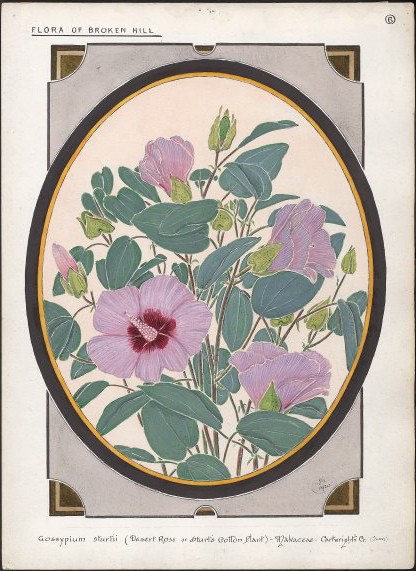
"Gossypium sturtii" by Ebenezer Edward Gostelow (1867–1944)

Gossypium sturtianum, or Sturt's desert rose, is a woody shrub, closely related to cultivated cotton, found in most mainland states of Australia and the Northern Territory. It is also known as the Darling River rose, cotton rosebush and Australian cotton.

The plant has a life span of about 10 years, growing from 1–2 m tall and 1–2 m wide. The flowers are up to 12 cm in diameter: they can be seen for most of the year but peak in late winter. The colour of the petals ranges from pale pink to dark purple to maroon. The five petals are arranged in a whorl and have a dark red centre. The leaves are different shades of green, round and strongly scented when crushed.

It is the floral emblem of the Northern Territory and is featured on the Flag of the Northern Territory.

== Taxonomy ==
Two varieties are often recognized.

- G. sturtianum var. nandewarense (Derera) Fryxell is found only in north-eastern New South Wales (around Narrabri) and the Expedition Range in central Queensland.
- G. sturtianum var. sturtianum is more common and is found everywhere else.

G. sturtianum var. trilobum (F.Muell.) J.H.Willis is sometimes considered a synonym of Gossypium robinsonii.

== Ecology ==
The Sturt's desert rose is found in sandy and gravelly soils, along dry creek beds, watercourses, gorges and rocky slopes. Adaptations for this plant include:

- There are fewer stomata (the pores that release gas in the leaves), or they are protected. The stomata on the Sturt's desert rose are found on the underside of the leaf. This results in reduced water loss.
- They have internal water storage.
- They have deep root systems, so are able to reach water deep under the ground.

Sturt's desert rose contains gossypol, a chemical toxic to animals other than ruminants.

The first European to see the flower was Charles Sturt in 1844–45, after whom it is named. In 1947, James Hamlyn Willis gave the shrub its current botanical name. It is not considered to be at risk in the wild. It is the floral emblem of the Northern Territory and appears in stylised form on the official flag with seven rather than five petals.
