= Neomeoneurites =

Scientific classification
- Kingdom: Animalia
- Phylum: Arthropoda
- Clade: Pancrustacea
- Class: Insecta
- Order: Diptera
- Family: Carnidae
- Genus: Neomeoneurites; Hennig, 1972

Type species
- Neomeoneurites chilensis Hennig, 1972

Genus of flies

Neomeoneurites is a genus of flies (Diptera). There are 2 described species.

== Species ==
- M. chilensis Hennig, 1972
- N. dissitus Wheeler, 1994
