= Hemeromyia =

Scientific classification
- Domain: Eukaryota
- Kingdom: Animalia
- Phylum: Arthropoda
- Class: Insecta
- Order: Diptera
- Superfamily: Carnoidea
- Family: Carnidae
- Genus: Hemeromyia; Coquillett, 1902

Type species
- Hemeromyia obscura Coquillett, 1902

Synonyms
- Paramadiza Melander, 1913

Genus of flies

Hemeromyia is a genus of flies (Diptera).

== Species ==
- H. afghanica Papp, 1979
- H. alberichae Stucke, 2016
- H. anthracina Collin, 1949
- H. australis Barraclough, 1994
- H. longicornis Papp, 2003
- H. longirostris Carles-Tolrá, 1992
- H. obscura Coquillett, 1902
- H. remotinervis (Strobl, 1902)
- H. vibrissina Papp, 2003
- H. washingtona (Melander, 1913)
