= Meoneurites =

Scientific classification
- Kingdom: Animalia
- Phylum: Arthropoda
- Clade: Pancrustacea
- Class: Insecta
- Order: Diptera
- Superfamily: Carnoidea
- Family: Carnidae
- Genus: †Meoneurites; Hennig, 1965

Type species
- Meoneurites enigmatica Hennig, 1965

Extinct genus of flies

Meoneurites is an extinct genus of flies (Diptera). There is a single described species.

== Species ==
- †M. enigmatica Hennig, 1965
