= Flag of the Northern Territory =

Australian state flag

Northern Territory
- Use: Civil and state flag
- Proportion: 1:2
- Adopted: 1 July 1978; 48 years ago
- Design: A vertical 1:2 bicolour of black (charged with the Southern Cross) and ochre (charged with a stylised Sturt's Desert Rose)

Raising the new flag in Darwin, 1 July 1978

The flag of the Northern Territory was officially adopted in 1978. The Northern Territory has existed as a territory of Australia since 1911, using the Australian National Flag (the Blue Ensign) but did not adopt its own flag until it was granted self-government in 1978.

== History ==
The flag of the Northern Territory was officially acknowledged and raised for the first time in a ceremony celebrating self-government, on the esplanade in Darwin, the Territorial capital, on 1 July 1978. The ceremony was further acknowledged by a 19-gun salute from HMAS Derwent. As the Northern Territory never had colonial status or a prior flag, it was decided that an original design would be created. The flag was designed by Robert Ingpen, a prominent artist originally from Drysdale, Victoria. Ingpen used a number of designs suggested by the public as a basis for his final design.

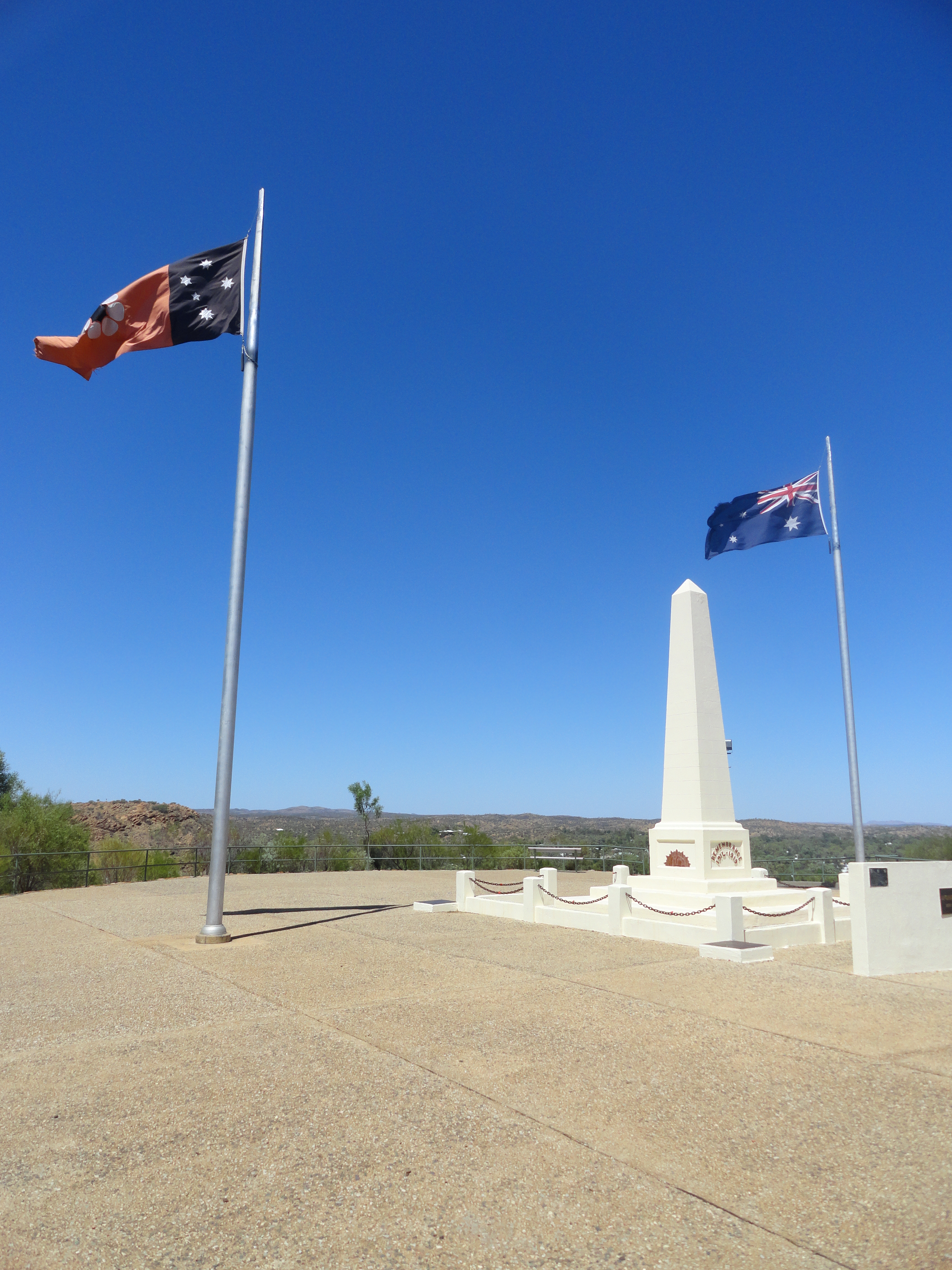
The Northern Territory and Australian flags at the war memorial at ANZAC Hill, Alice Springs

== Design ==
The flag differs from the flags of the Australian states as it does not include the British Blue Ensign. The flag of the Australian Capital Territory adopted 15 years later is similar in design. The flag's colours consist of the official Territorian colours of black, white and ochre (making it the only flag among Australia's states and territories not to feature the colour blue). The Southern Cross appears as five white stars on a black panel at the hoist. In the fly of the flag is a stylised Sturt's Desert Rose, the territory's floral emblem since 1961, with seven white petals and a black seven-pointed core. The seven white petals represent the six Australian States and the Northern Territory.

== See also ==
- Coat of arms of the Northern Territory
- List of Australian flags
