= Enigmocarnus =

Scientific classification
- Kingdom: Animalia
- Phylum: Arthropoda
- Class: Insecta
- Order: Diptera
- Superfamily: Carnoidea
- Family: Carnidae
- Genus: Enigmocarnus; Buck, 2007

Type species
- Enigmocarnus chloropiformis Buck, 2007

Genus of flies

Enigmocarnus is a genus of flies (Diptera). There is 1 described species.

== Species ==
- E. chloropiformis Buck, 2007
