= Meoneura =

Scientific classification
- Kingdom: Animalia
- Phylum: Arthropoda
- Class: Insecta
- Order: Diptera
- Superfamily: Carnoidea
- Family: Carnidae
- Genus: Meoneura; Rondani, 1856

Type species
- Agromyza obscurella Fallén, 1823

Synonyms
- Anisonevra Lioy, 1864; Agrobia Lioy, 1864; Psalidotus Becker, 1903; Anisoneura Neave, 1939

Genus of flies

Meoneura is a genus of carnid flies (Diptera).

== Species ==
Species include:

- Meoneura acuticerca Gregor, 1973
- Meoneura algerica Hennig, 1937
- Meoneura alphabetica Carles-Tolrá & Ventura, 2002
- Meoneura alpina Hennig, 1948
- Meoneura amurensis Ozerov, 1986
- Meoneura anceps Frey, 1915
- Meoneura arctica Ozerov, 1991
- Meoneura asiatica Papp, 1976
- Meoneura atoma Papp, 1981
- Meoneura australis Deeming, 1997
- Meoneura baluchistani Duda, 1936
- Meoneura bicuspidata Collin, 1930
- Meoneura bilboi Stuke & Freidberg, 2017
- Meoneura biseta Deeming, 1976
- Meoneura brakeae Stuke & Freidberg, 2017
- Meoneura californica Sabrosky, 1961
- Meoneura carpathica Papp, 1977
- Meoneura caucasica Ozerov, 1991
- Meoneura compacta Gregor, 1971
- Meoneura davidi Stuke & Freidberg, 2017
- Meoneura digitata Sabrosky, 1959
- Meoneura elongella (Zetterstedt, 1838)
- Meoneura exigua Collin, 1930
- Meoneura falcata Papp, 1997
- Meoneura flabella Carles-Tolra, 1992
- Meoneura flavifacies Collin, 1930
- Meoneura flavifrons Papp, 1981
- Meoneura forcipata Sabrosky, 1959
- Meoneura freta Collin, 1930
- Meoneura furcata Hennig, 1937
- Meoneura glaberrima Becker, 1910
- Meoneura goldemari Stuke & Freidberg, 2017
- Meoneura graeca Hennig, 1972
- Meoneura granadensis Lyneborg, 1969
- Meoneura grimmorum Stuke & Freidberg, 2017
- Meoneura helvetica Papp, 1997
- Meoneura hennigi Gregor, 1971
- Meoneura hungarica Papp, 1977
- Meoneura inversa Papp, 1976
- Meoneura kaszabi Papp, 1976
- Meoneura krivosheinae Ozerov, 1991
- Meoneura lacteipennis (Fallén, 1823)
- Meoneura lamellata Collin, 1930
- Meoneura lilliputensis Stuke & Freidberg, 2017
- Meoneura longifurca Papp, 1997
- Meoneura maritima Ozerov, 1991
- Meoneura meszarosi Stuke & Freidberg, 2017
- Meoneura milleri Gregor, 1973
- Meoneura minuscula Papp, 1977
- Meoneura minutissima (Zetterstedt, 1860)
- Meoneura mongolica Papp, 1976
- Meoneura moravica Gregor & Papp, 1981
- Meoneura neottiophila Collin, 1930
- Meoneura nevadensis Lyneborg, 1969
- Meoneura nigeriensis Deeming, 1976
- Meoneura nigrifrons Malloch, 1915
- Meoneura nilsholgerssoni Stuke & Freidberg, 2017
- Meoneura nitidiuscula Collin, 1949
- Meoneura obscurella (Fallén, 1823)
- Meoneura oscari Stuke & Freidberg, 2017
- Meoneura palaestinensis Hennig, 1937
- Meoneura pamphylica Ozerov, 2008
- Meoneura paralacteipennis Papp, 1977
- Meoneura paraseducta Papp, 1976
- Meoneura parva Papp, 1976
- Meoneura perlamellata Hennig, 1937
- Meoneura polita Sabrosky, 1959
- Meoneura prima (Becker, 1903)
- Meoneura pseudoflavifacies Papp, 1997
- Meoneura pseudoseducta Papp, 1976
- Meoneura pseudotriangularis Papp, 1976
- Meoneura pteropleuralis Sabrosky, 1959
- Meoneura quadrisetosa Papp, 1976
- Meoneura sabroskyi Papp, 2006
- Meoneura scutellata Deeming, 1976
- Meoneura seducta Collin, 1937
- Meoneura sinclairi Wheeler, 2000
- Meoneura stepposa Ozerov, 1994
- Meoneura subfreta Papp, 1979
- Meoneura sublongisetosa Carles-Tolrá, 2008
- Meoneura subnivalis Gregor, 1971
- Meoneura triangularis Collin, 1930
- Meoneura tschorsnigi Carles-Tolrá, 2008
- Meoneura tunisica Papp, 1978
- Meoneura ungulata Carles-Tolrá & Ventura, 2002
- Meoneura vagans (Fallén, 1823)
- Meoneura vieja Grimaldi, 1997
- Meoneura wichtelorum Stuke & Freidberg, 2017
- Meoneura wirthi Sabrosky, 1959
