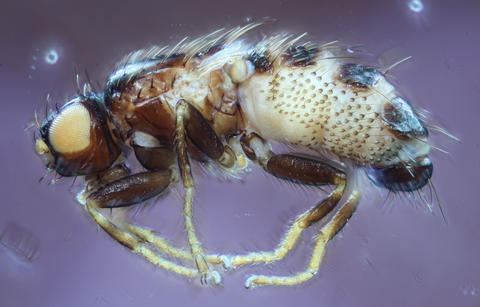

Scientific classification
- Kingdom: Animalia
- Phylum: Arthropoda
- Clade: Pancrustacea
- Class: Insecta
- Order: Diptera
- Family: Carnidae
- Genus: Carnus
- Species: C. hemapterus

Binomial name
- Carnus hemapterus Nitzsch, 1818

Synonyms
- Cenchridobia eggeri Schiner, 1862; Carnus setosus Stobbe, 1913; Carnus hæmapterus; Newman, 1834

= Carnus hemapterus =

Species of fly

Carnus hemapterus is a small-bodied and partly black-coloured carnid fly. In their adult stage of life, they are blood-sucking ectoparasites of nestling birds. Within the genus Carnus, this is the only species widespread across Europe and the cold and temperate regions of Asia and North America. Female body length is about 1.5 mm, males are smaller. It typically occurs in the nests of medium- to large-bodied birds, provided that the nest is not on the ground. It is particularly common on the chicks of owls, falcons, rollers, bee-eaters and starlings. Females give birth to larvae that live within the nest and feed on organic debris and the pupae also overwinter there. The emergence of imagines is synchronized to the hatch of host nestlings in the subsequent year. They prefer larger chicks within the nest. Adult flies have a winged and an unwinged variety, the latter being more common. In fact, unwinged flies still carry the basal part of their wings, but the majority of the wing is broken off (see a close view of the above photo). Flies live only on the nestlings before and during the development of the plumage, and disappear later on.

Infestations by Carnus hemapterus appear to be rather harmless for the host chicks. In spite of that, barn owl females advertise their resistance genes by the dark spots on their breast and belly; nestlings of heavily spotted females tend to be more resistant. In this study, potential environmental confounding effects were controlled for by cross-fostering chicks.

The faeces and blood remains from these ectoparasitic flies make spots on the eggshell surface of host birds. This contamination appear to increase abundance and diversity of eggshell bacterial loads and, consequently, increase the chance of embryo death.

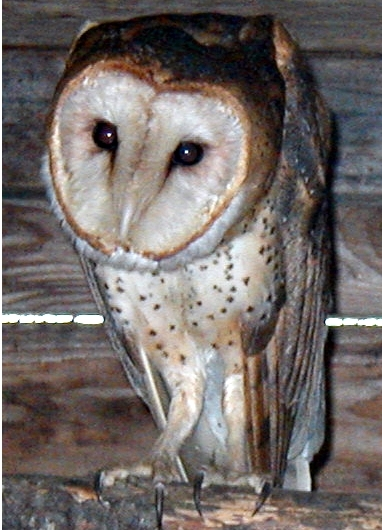
Barn owl, heavily spotted

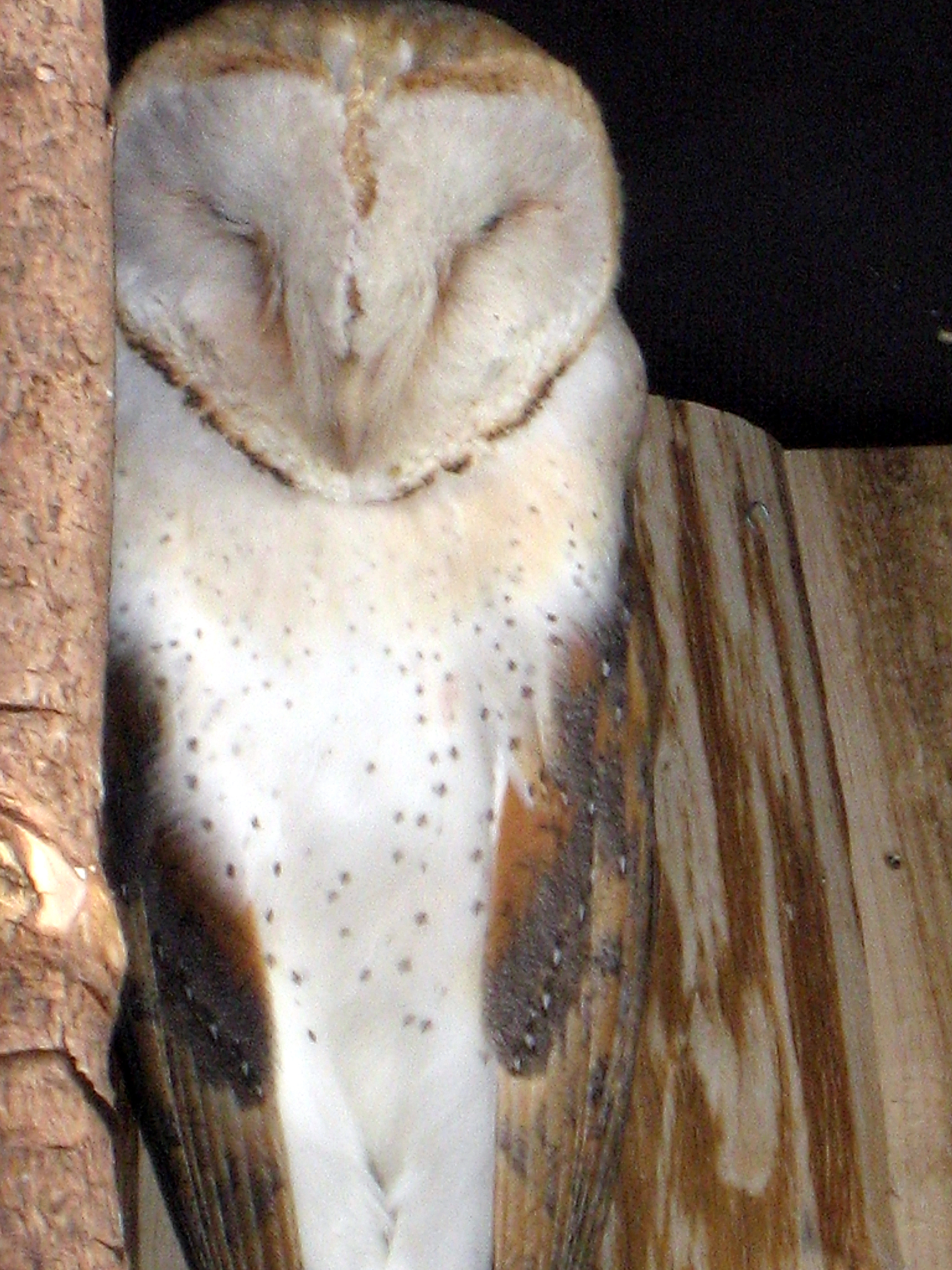
Barn owl, medium coloration

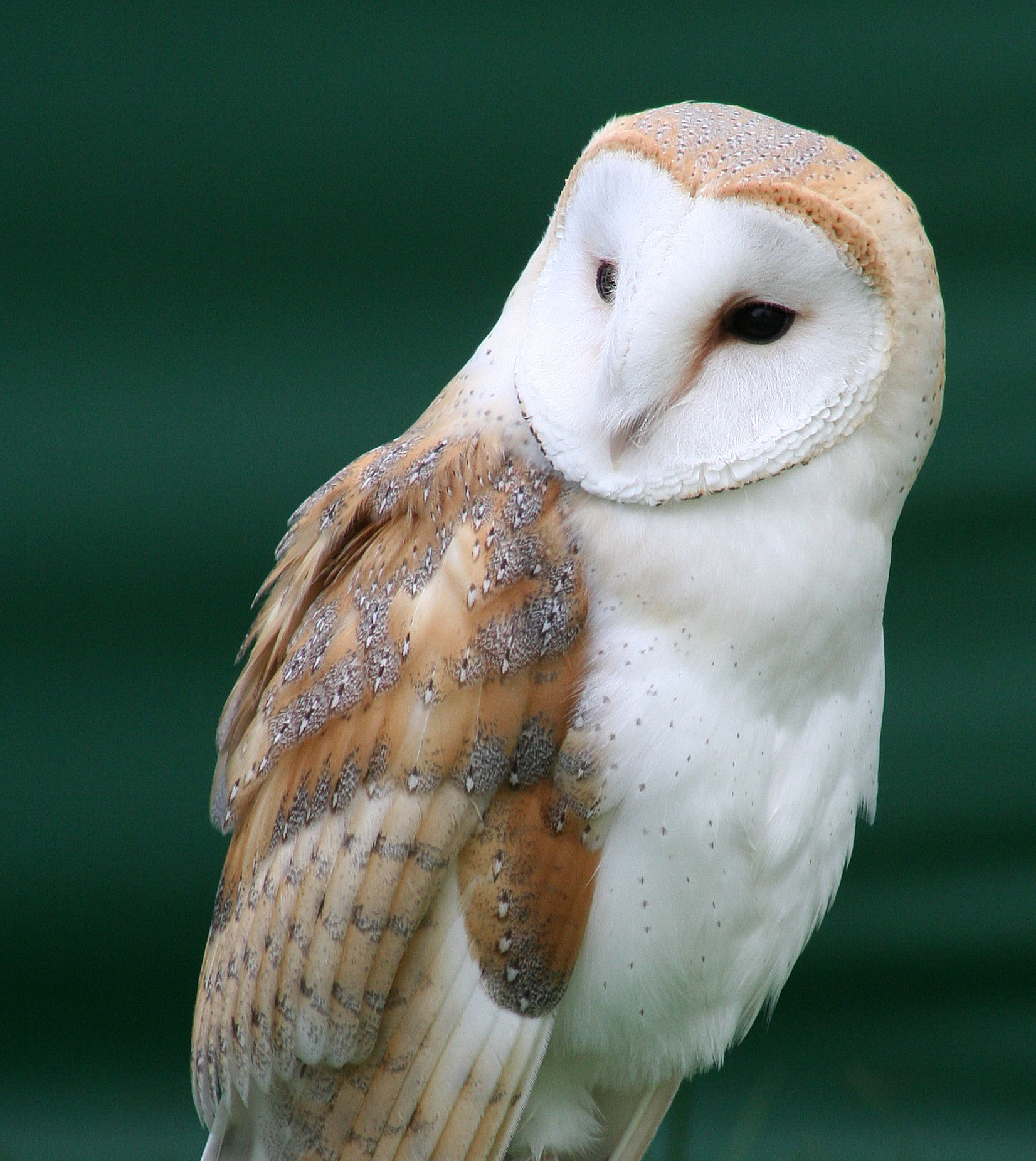
Barn owl, weakly spotted
