= E. E. Gostelow =

Australian painter (1866–1944)

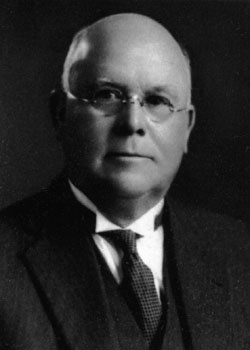
- Born: Ebenezer Edward Gostelow; 18 December 1866; Sydney, New South Wales, Australia
- Died: 9 May 1944 (aged 77); Burwood, New South Wales
- Occupation: Natural history painter

Ebenezer Edward Gostelow (18 December 1866 – 9 May 1944) was an Australian painter of flowers, birds and insects. He had a fifty-year career as a teacher in New South Wales schools, the last twenty years of which he was headmaster of schools throughout the state. Gostelow began painting birds and wildflowers in about 1910, inspired by the natural diversity he encountered at the various locations where he lived and worked. From then until his death in 1944 he produced a huge number of meticulously-detailed watercolour paintings depicting natural history subjects, including paintings of all the known species of birds in Australia. The National Library of Australia holds over 800 of his works in its collection.

== Biography ==
=== Early life ===
Ebenezer Edward Gostelow was born on 18 December 1866 at Darlinghurst in inner-city Sydney, the eldest of eight children of Ebenezer Gostelow and his second wife Martha (née Taylor). His father worked as a clerk of works with the New South Wales Department of Public Instruction.^{[A]}

=== Teaching ===
Gostelow (known as 'Eb' by his family members) began his teaching career in 1881, aged fifteen, with seven months on probation at Surry Hills South Boys Primary School in inner suburban Sydney. In 1882 he was promoted to pupil teacher on an annual salary of £54. In 1884 he was transferred to nearby Chippendale Primary School. Gostelow was transferred to Leichhardt Primary School in 1886. In 1887 he was one of fifteen pupil teachers selected to undertake formal teacher training at the Fort Street Training School at Observatory Hill in Sydney.

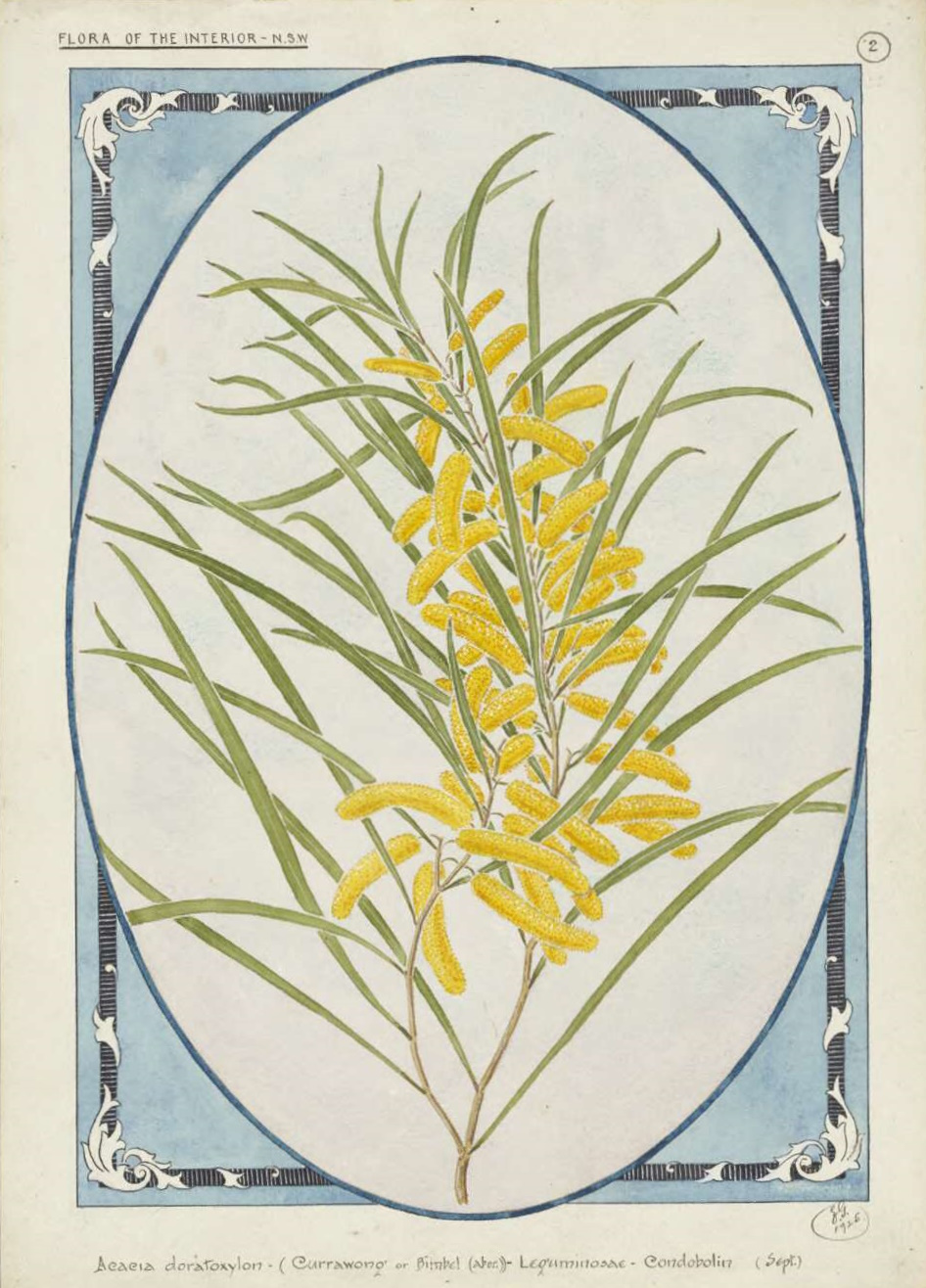
Acacia doratoxylon (Currawang, Bimbel or Spearwood), Condobolin (1925).

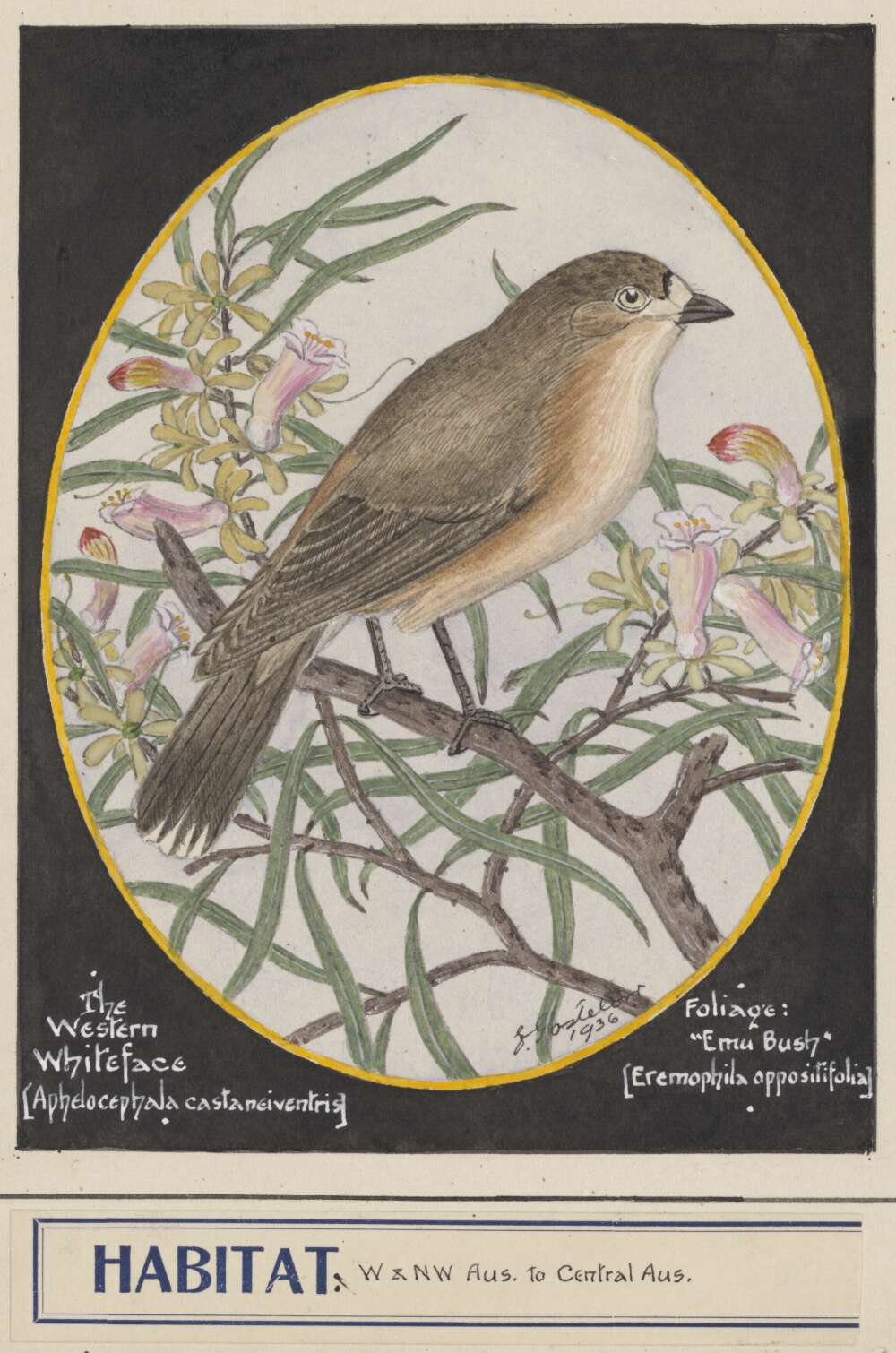
The western whiteface (Aphelocephala leucopsis ssp. castaneiventris) and emu bush (Eremophila oppositifolia) (1936).

Although he had received no formal art training, Gostelow's artistic talent was recognised at an early stage. In 1886 his work was shown in the Colonial and Indian Exhibition at South Kensington in London, listed in the official catalogue as "A Work of Art entitled 'The Pencil and Pen, their uses to Man", and comprising Pencil, Crayon and Ink Drawings, Mapping and Penmanship".

By October 1888 Gostelow was teaching at a school in Leichhardt (an inner western suburb of Sydney), when he was provisionally promoted to a teacher (class 2A).

In 1889 Gostelow was "instructed to take temporary charge" of the primary school at Condobolin on the Lachlan River in the central west of New South Wales. Later that year he spent a month at Bowning Public School, before being posted to Moorilda, in the Blayney district, in September 1889.

During 1890 Gostelow was posted to a series of short-term substitute teaching positions at Gordon, Marsden Park, West Redfern, Leichhardt and further afield at Mundongo, near Tumut in the south-west of New South Wales. In October 1890 he stood in as teacher at the public school at Sandhurst (a semi-rural locality north-west of Sydney now known as Glenhaven in The Hills Shire).

Gostelow and Ada Mary Finney were married on 30 December 1890 in the Sydney suburb of Lewisham. The couple had three sons and a daughter, born between 1891 and 1906.

In 1891 Gostelow was appointed to Amaroo Public School near Molong in the Central West of New South Wales, where he remained for eighteen months. During 1892 Gostelow was once again posted to Condobolin, remaining there until 1894. In late 1894 Gostelow returned to Sydney, appointed in August as an assistant teacher at Summer Hill Public School. In March 1897 Gostelow was transferred from Kegworth Public School in Leichhardt to Nundle Public School, high on the Great Dividing Range near Tamworth. In 1899 he was posted back to Sydney to a school in Arncliffe, followed by five years at Marrickville West.

=== Painting ===
In 1910 Gostelow was promoted to the position of headmaster of Warren Public School, at a township on the Macquarie River. It was at Warren that Gostelow "first thought of taking up painting". He later admitted that he "didn't know much about birds at that time, but with the aid of boys I quickly learned their favourite haunts". Gostelow began sketching birds and used crayons to colour his drawings, but found that method unsatisfactory, so he began painting with watercolours. In December 1913 "a number of excellent water-colour drawings of birds and flora of the Warren district", painted by Gostelow, were displayed at the annual meeting of the Gould League of Bird Lovers held at the Girls' High School in Castlereagh Street in Sydney.

It became Gostelow's lifelong passion to take every opportunity to observe the local flora and fauna as he was transferred from place to place in New South Wales. As a way of encouraging an appreciation of nature study in his pupils he began to draw birds and flowers in coloured chalks on the blackboard.

In September 1914 it was reported that Gostelow had received a transfer and promotion to Murrumburrah. He was headmaster of Murrumburrah Public School from September 1914 to 1916.

In August 1916 it was reported that Gostelow had been promoted "to a large school at Broken Hill", in the far west of the state.

=== Broken Hill ===
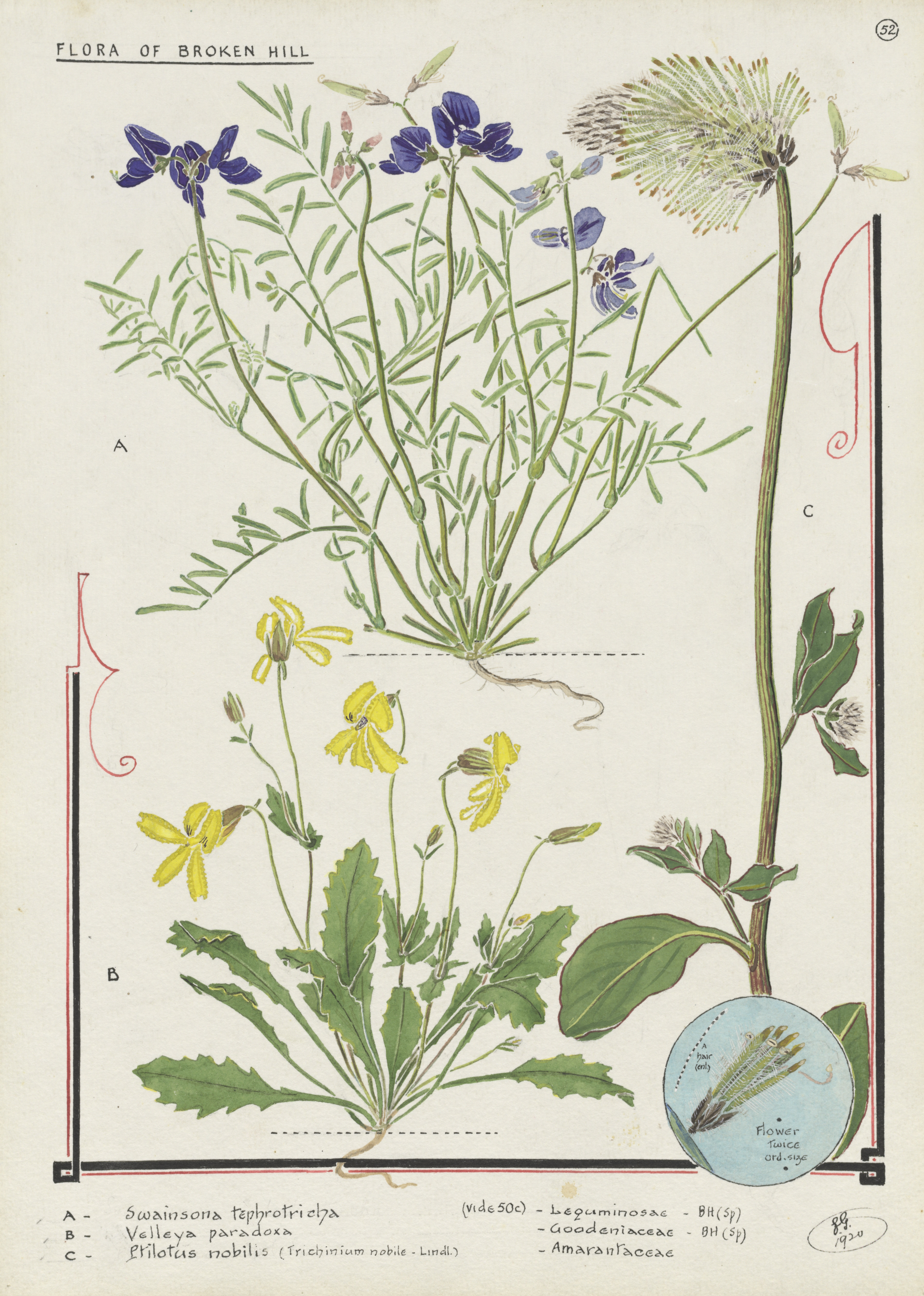
Watercolour painting of Swainsona tephrotricha. Velleya paradoxa and Ptilotus nobilis, plants from the Broken Hill region (1920).

Gostelow was headmaster of Alma Public School at South Broken Hill for four and a half years, from 1917 to 1921.^{[B]}

In November 1917, "at the request of numerous friends", Gostelow exhibited a number of his paintings at the Alma School, a collection comprising over 150 species of Australian native birds representative of a variety of different habitats. A writer commented on "the immense amount of work the artist has undertaken in pursuit of his favourite hobby", adding: "The colouring of the birds is rich and true, the form is perfect".

Gostelow was a foundation member of the Barrier Field Naturalists' Club, formed in February 1920. In August 1920 the district experienced an especially large downpour of rain, the aftermath of which resulted in an abundance of wildflowers seldom seen in the semi-arid environment. In September the Barrier Field Naturalists' Club held a wildflower show in the local technical college with the aim of stimulating interest in the study, protection and appreciation of the local flora. There were competitive exhibits for school children for both fresh and pressed wildflowers, obtained from the neighbouring hills and plains. In the week beforehand local school teachers had taken their classes on excursions to collect specimens. The exhibits "were numerous" and the room was described as being "full of the scent of the wilds". Also included in the show was an exhibition of 150 of Gostelow's paintings of Broken Hill native flora.

In August 1921 Gostelow was transferred from Alma Public School to South Strathfield Public School in Sydney.

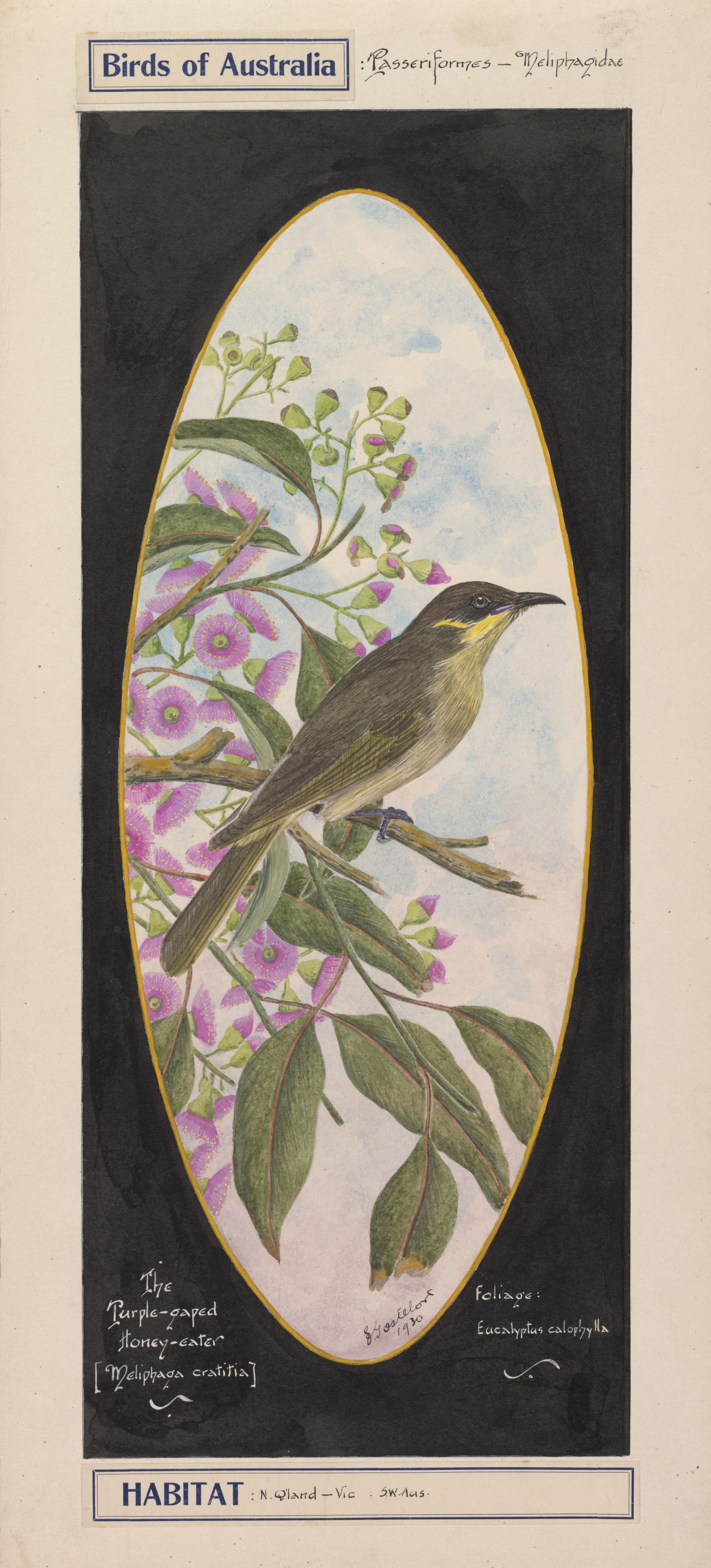
Watercolour painting of the Purple-gaped honeyeater (Lichenostomus cratitius) (1930).

=== Sydney schools ===
By 1924 Ebenezer and Ada Gostelow were living at Concord West in inner western Sydney. In September 1924 Gostelow sent "a numerous and particularly fine selection of water-colour paintings of New South Wales coastal wild flowers" to Broken Hill for the Barrier Field Naturalists' Club "wild flower show and general exhibition" held in the town hall.

For the remainder of his teaching career Gostelow was headmaster of schools in Sydney, where he continued to explore the surrounding bushland and paint natural history subjects. He was at South Strathfield Public School until 1924, after which he was in charge of schools at Darlinghurst, Eastwood and Auburn, finally retiring as headmaster of Auburn Public School in December 1931 after a fifty year career with the Department of Education.

In July 1931, five months before his retirement, it was reported that Gostelow "has amassed a collection of over 1300 natural history paintings", a collection that included "700 native plants, 350 finches, 100 butterflies, 69 honeyeaters, 59 parrots and cockatoos, and 36 flycatchers", many of them painted from specimens supplied by the Australian Museum. Gostelow explained to the writer that he had never sold any of his paintings: "I wouldn't like to commercialise my art in any way; I just paint because I love it".

=== Retirement ===
After his retirement Gostelow reworked many of his earlier paintings in order to improve their accuracy. Being able to devote himself full-time to painting, he set out to depict all the known species of birds in Australia. He was loaned skins from the collection of the Australian Museum to assist his task. During his lifetime Gostelow painted 820 images of the 700 species of Australian birds known at that time.

Gostelow's artwork was meticulous. His watercolour botanical paintings were exact representations, each annotated with the Latin species name, common name, family name and date and place of collection. He also created images in the fashionable Art Deco style, framing his subjects in coloured organic patterns or geometric designs, sometimes framed in ovals or other shapes. He not only depicted flowers, but also foliage, fruiting bodies and the various stages of flower development, sometimes including insects in his compositions.

Gostelow was a council member of the New South Wales Naturalists' Club in 1928 and 1929 and 1931 to 1934, and its vice-president from 1929 to 1931. He presented a lecture on parrots in 1929 and on cuckoos in 1933, using his own paintings as illustrations. He also held exhibitions of his paintings of moths and birds.

Ebenezer E. Gostelow died on 9 May 1944, aged 77, at the Western Suburbs Hospital at Croydon in Sydney's inner west.

== National Library Collection ==
After Gostelow's death in 1944 his bird paintings were bequeathed to the National Library of Australia (NLA) in Canberra. Gostelow's youngest son, Clifford, who shared his father's passion for nature study, inherited the collection of his father's native flora paintings. In 1969 he donated these paintings to the NLA, which now holds over 800 of Ebenezer Gostelow's flora and fauna paintings in its Pictures Collection. Many of Gostelow's images have been digitised by the National Library of Australia.

A number of Gostelow's bird paintings have been included in poetry publications by the NLA, including Judith Wright's Birds: Poems (60th Anniversary Edition), published in 2022.

== Gallery ==
A selection of images of watercolour paintings by E. E. Gostelow
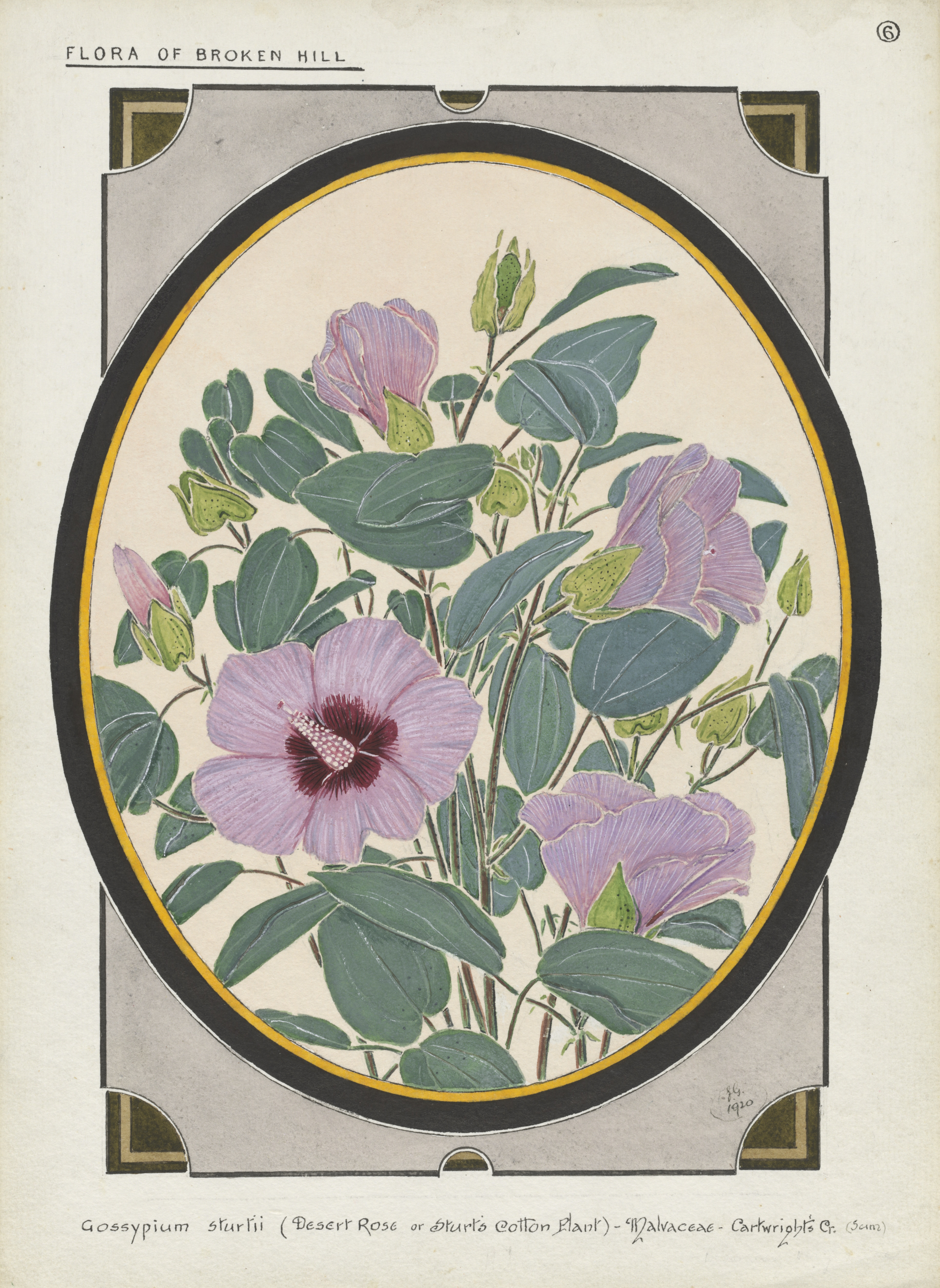
Sturt's desert rose (Gossypium sturtianum) (1920).

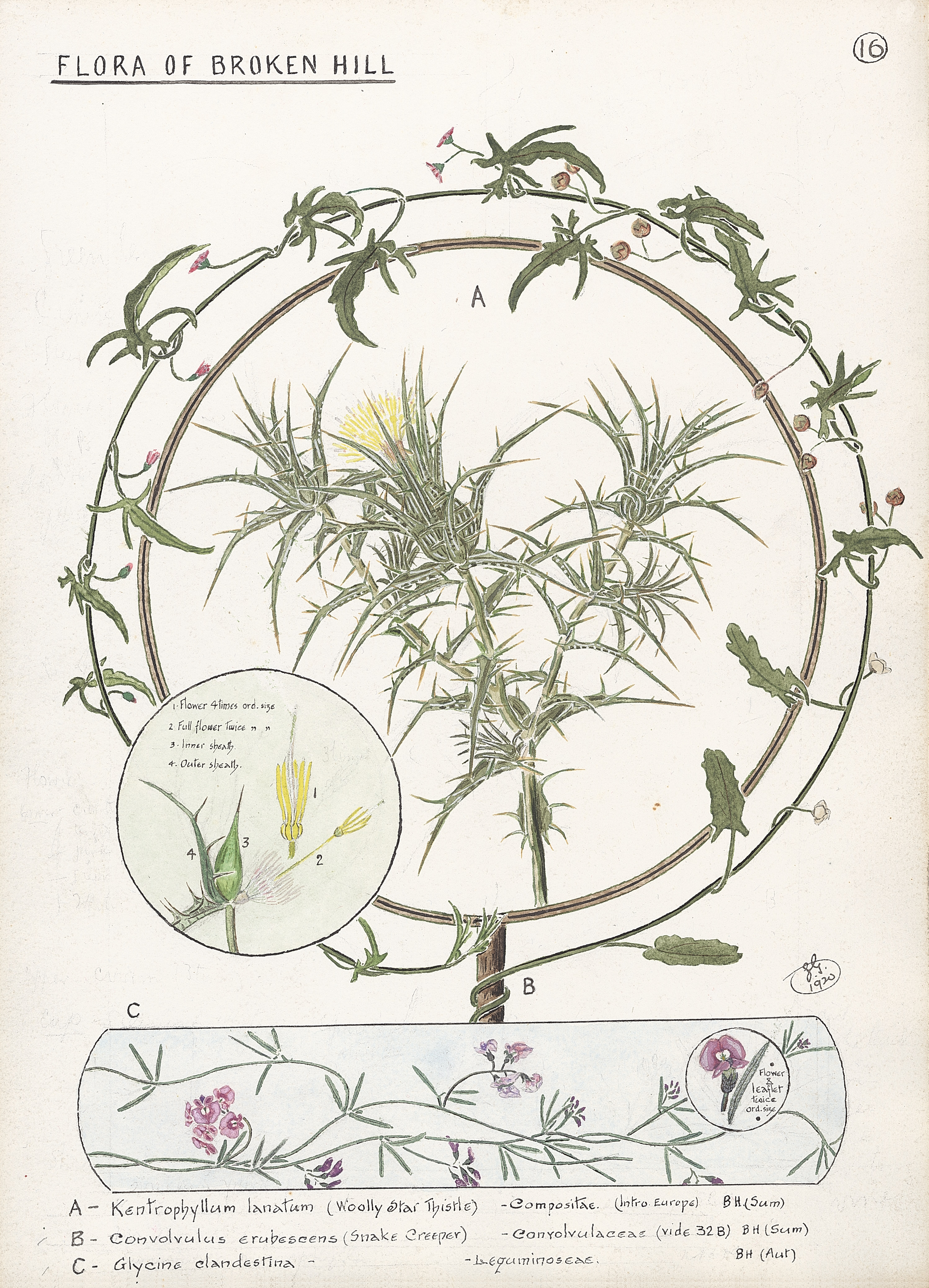
Kentrophyllum lanatum. Convolvulus erubescens and Glycine clandestina, plants from the Broken Hill region (1920).

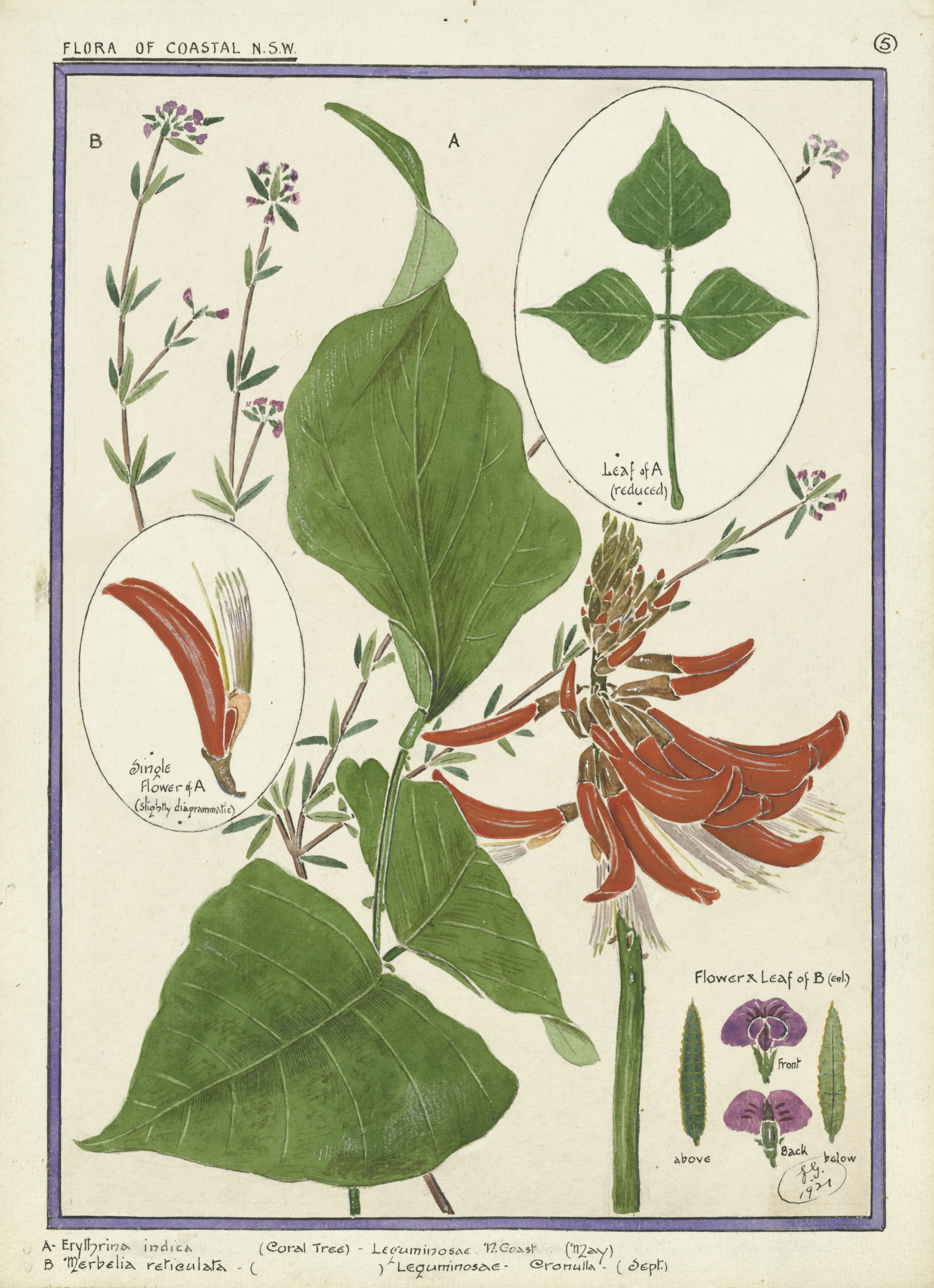
Coral tree (Erythrina indica) and Mirbelia rubiifolia, flora of coastal NSW (1921).

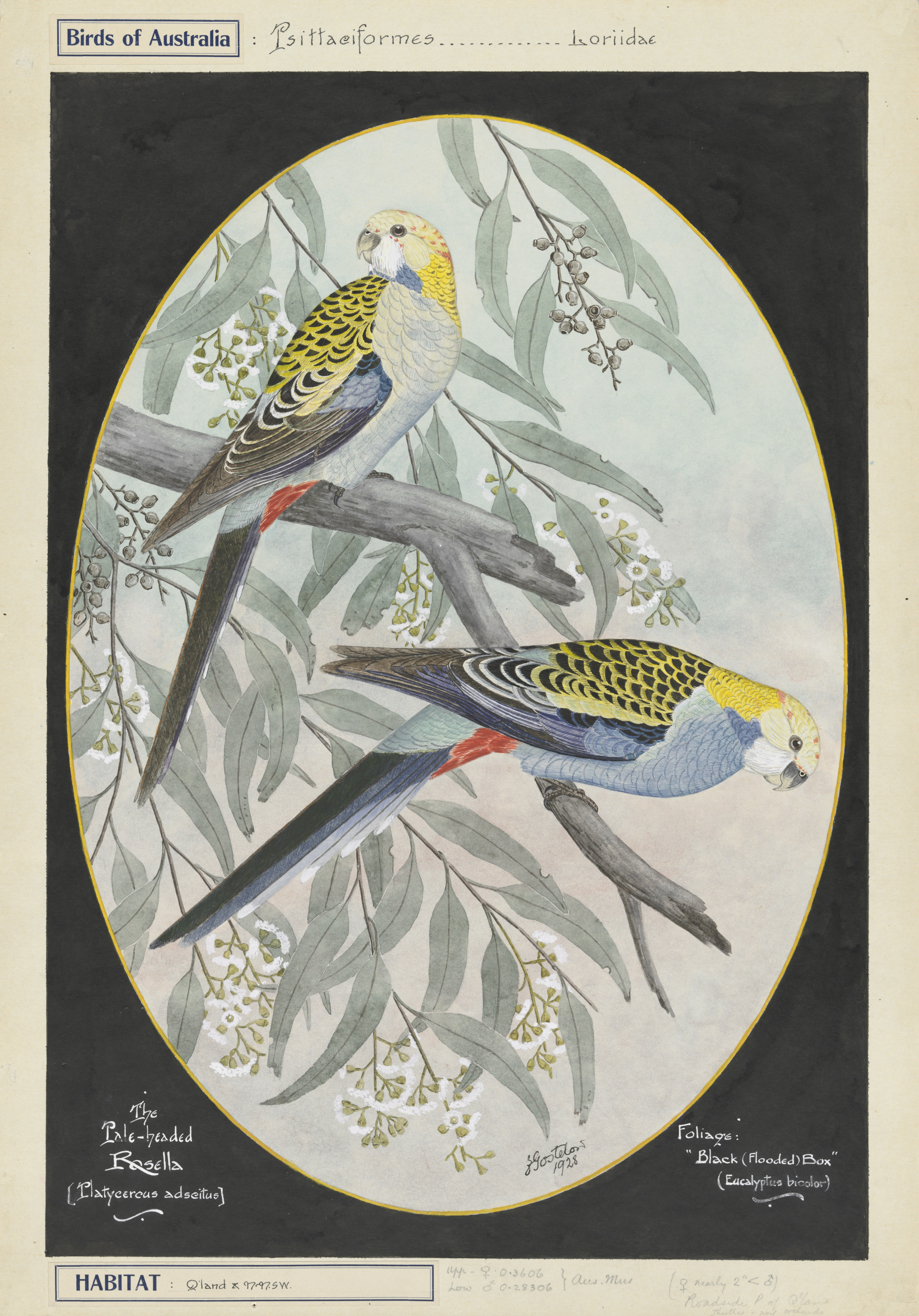
Pale-headed rosellas (Platycercus adscitus) (1928).

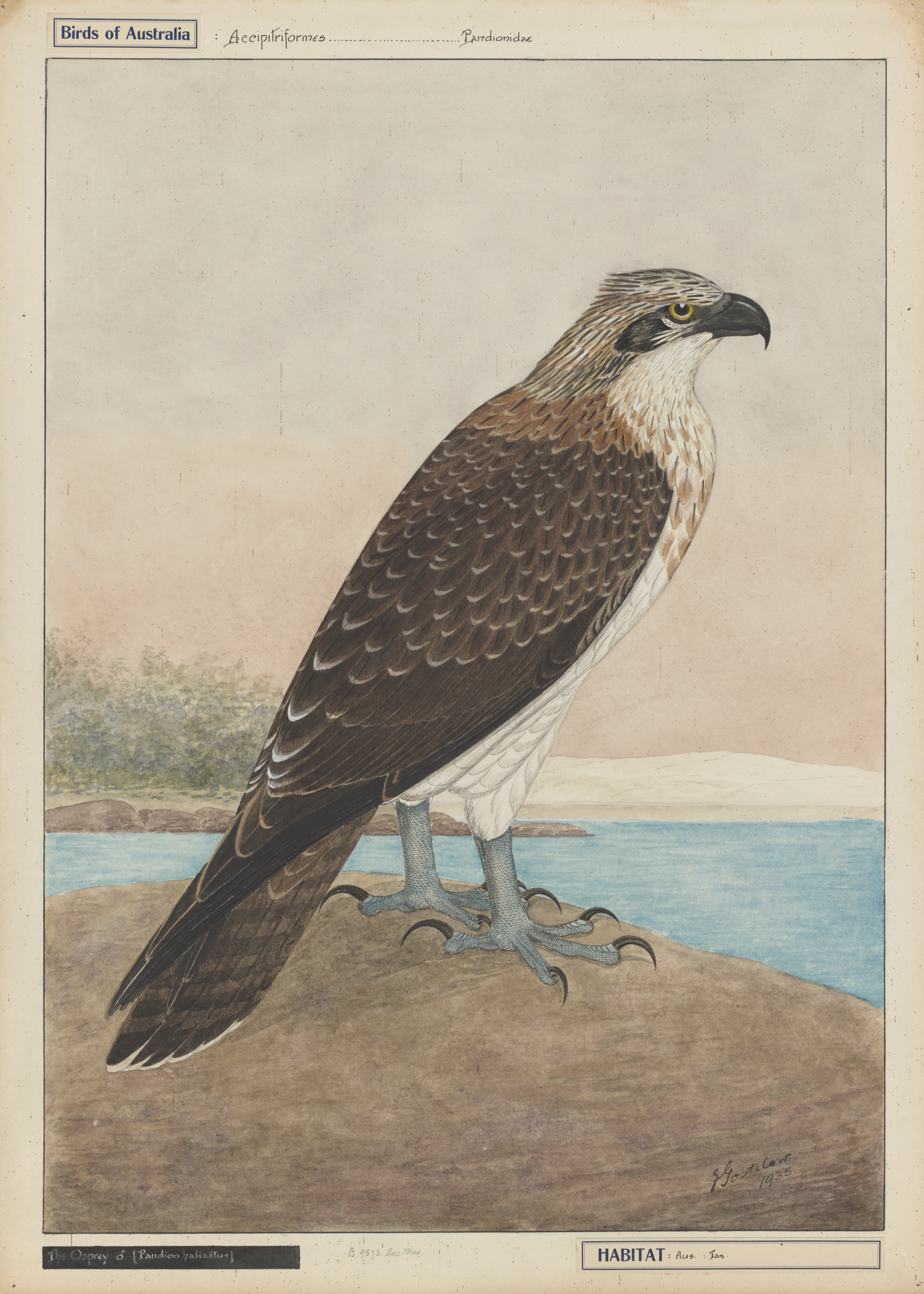
Osprey (Pandion haliaetus) (1935).

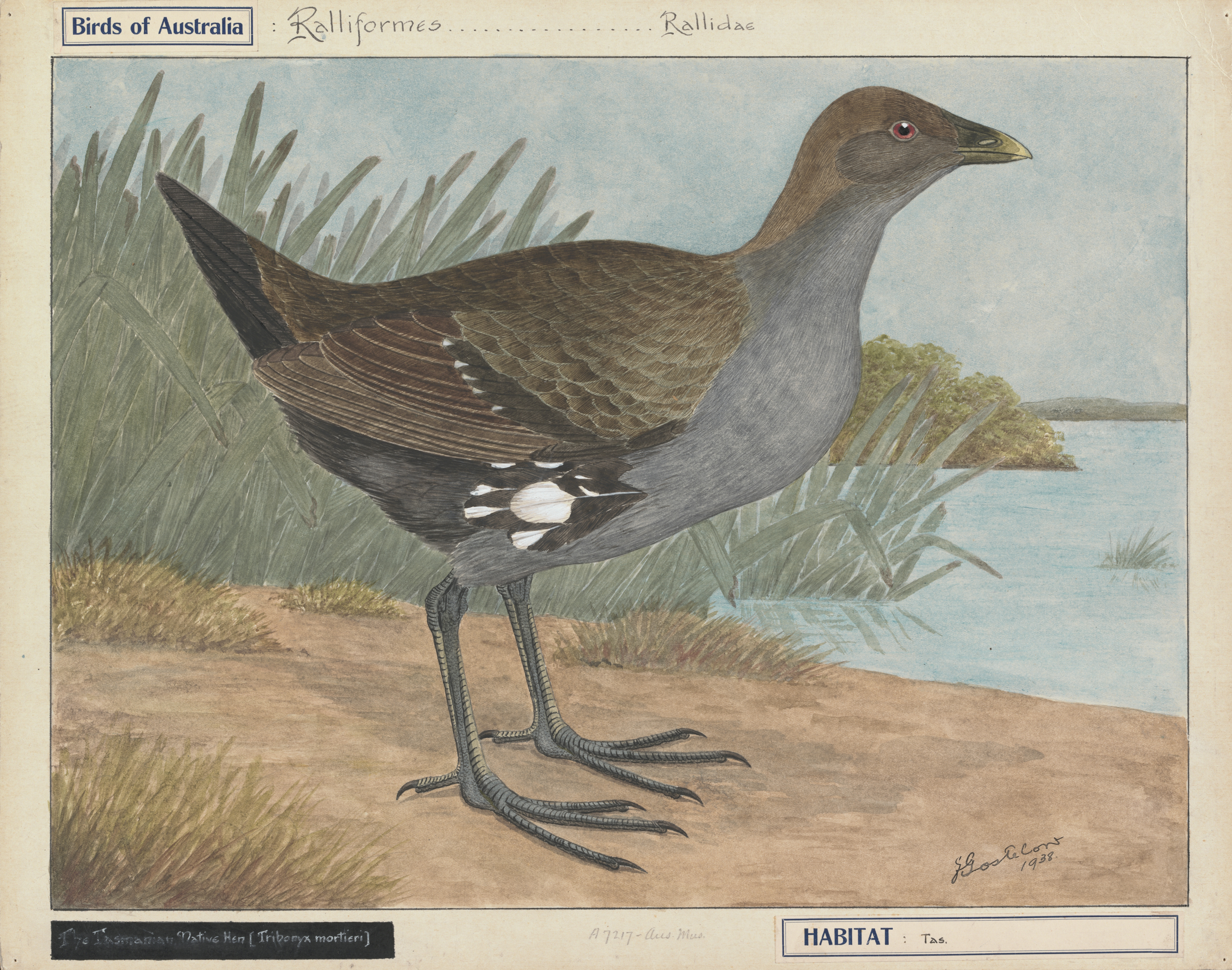
Tasmanian nativehen (Tribonyx mortierii) (1938).

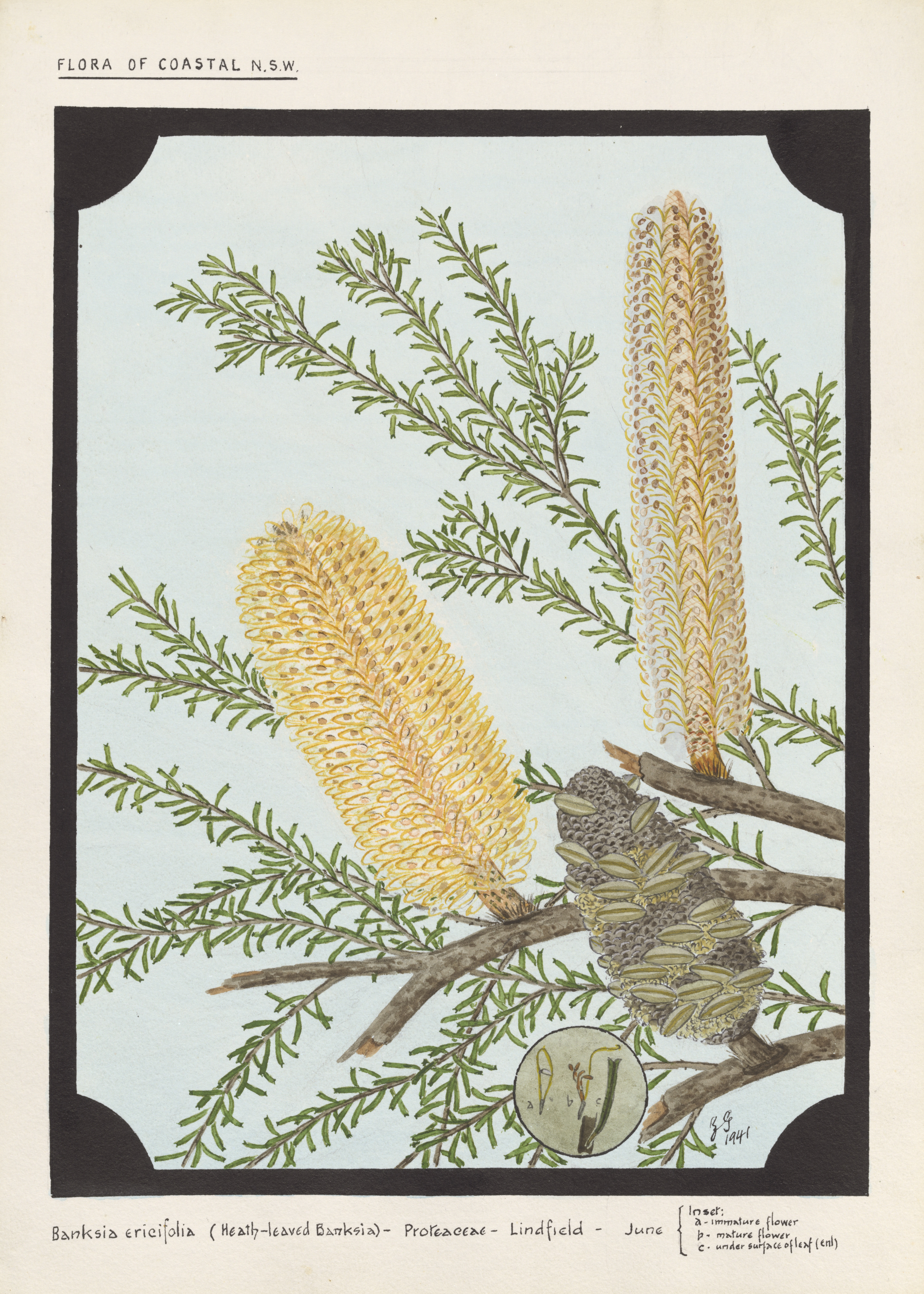
Banksia ericifolia, flora of coastal NSW (1941).

== Notes ==
A.Ebenezer Gostelow (senior) was a native of Aylesbury in county Buckinghamshire. In 1848, aged six, he emigrated to Sydney from England with his parents and siblings, aboard the ship Equestrian.

B.South Broken Hill, previously known as Alma, is a suburb of Broken Hill, separated from the city by the ore body known as the 'line of lode'.

== See also ==
- List of Australian botanical illustrators
