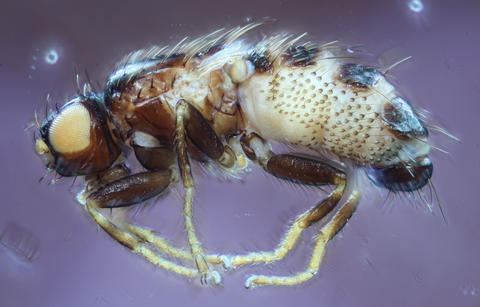
- Carnus hemapterus

Scientific classification
- Domain: Eukaryota
- Kingdom: Animalia
- Phylum: Arthropoda
- Class: Insecta
- Order: Diptera
- Superfamily: Carnoidea
- Family: Carnidae
- Genus: Carnus; Nitzsch, 1818

Type species
- Carnus hemapterus Nitzsch, 1818

Synonyms
- Cenchridobia Schiner, 1862

= Carnus (fly) =

Genus of flies

Carnus is a genus of flies (Diptera) with 5 described species, all of which are parasites of birds. The adult flies locate a suitable host nest, then shed their wings and feed on the blood of the developing nestlings. Mature female flies lay their eggs in the nest, where their larvae develop on organic detritus.

== Species ==
- C. floridensis Grimaldi, 1997
- C. hemapterus Nitzsch, 1818
- C. mexicana Grimaldi, 1997
- C. occidentalis Grimaldi, 1997
- C. orientalis Maa, 1968

In 2014, C. orientalis was reported for the first time in Japan, parasitizing nestlings of the Ryūkyū scops owl, Otus elegans, a new host species record.
